= Susan Hill bibliography =

This is a list of the published fiction and non-fiction works of British author Susan Hill.

== Novels ==
- The Enclosure, Hutchinson 1961
- Do Me a Favour, Hutchinson 1963
- Gentleman and Ladies, Hamish Hamilton 1968; Penguin Paperback 1970
- A Change for the Better, Hamish Hamilton 1969; Penguin Paperback 1971
- I'm the King of the Castle, Hamish Hamilton 1970; Penguin Paperback 1972 (winner of the Somerset Maugham Award)
- Strange Meeting, Hamish Hamilton 1971; Penguin Paperback 1974
- The Bird of Night, Hamish Hamilton 1972; Penguin Paperback 1973 (shortlisted for the Booker Prize)
- In the Springtime of the Year, Hamish Hamilton 1973; Penguin Paperback 1974
- The Woman in Black - A Ghost Story, Hamish Hamilton Penguin Paperback 1983; Mandarin Paperback 1989; Vintage Paperback 1999
- Air and Angels, Sinclair Stevenson 1991; Mandarin Paperback 1993; Vintage 1999
- The Mist in the Mirror: A Ghost Story, Hamish Hamilton 1992; Mandarin paperback 1993; Vintage 1999
- Mrs de Winter, Sinclair Stevenson 1993; Mandarin Paperback 1994; Vintage 1999
- The Service of Clouds, Chatto & Windus 1998; Vintage 1999
- Simon Serrailler crime novels:
  - The Various Haunts of Men, Vintage, 2005
  - The Pure in Heart, Vintage, 2006
  - The Risk of Darkness, Chatto & Windus, 2006
  - The Vows of Silence, Chatto & Windus, 2008
  - Shadows in the Streets, 2010
  - The Betrayal of Trust, 2011
  - A Question of Identity, 2012
  - The Soul of Discretion, 2014
  - The Comforts of Home, 2018
  - The Benefit of Hindsight, 2019
  - A Change of Circumstance, 2021
- The Man in the Picture: A Ghost Story, 2007 Profile Books
- The Beacon, 2008 Chatto and Windus
- The Small Hand: A Ghost Story, 2010. Profile Books
- A Kind Man, 2011
- Dolly: A Ghost Story, 2012. Profile Books Ltd.
- Black Sheep, 2013. Chatto and Windus (144p)
- From the Heart, 2017 Chatto and Windus

== Short story collections ==
- The Albatross and other stories, Hamish Hamilton 1970; Penguin 1972
- A Bit of Singing and Dancing, Hamish Hamilton 1973; Penguin 1974
- Listening to the Orchestra, Long Barn Books 1997
- The Boy Who Taught the Beekeeper to Read, Chatto and Windus July 2003
- Farthing House : And Other Stories, Long Barn Books, 2006
- The Travelling Bag and Other Ghostly Stories, Profile Books, Sep 2016

== Chapbook ==
- The Custodian, Covent Garden Press 1972

== Non fiction ==
- The Magic Apple Tree, (autobiography) Hamish Hamilton, 1982; Penguin 1985; Long Barn Books 1998
- Through the Kitchen Window, Illustrated by Angela Barrett, Hamish Hamilton 1984; Penguin 1986
- Through the Garden Gate, (Illustrated by Angela Barrett), Hamish Hamilton, 1986
- The Lighting of the Lamps, (Collected pieces) Hamish Hamilton, 1987
- Shakespeare Country, (photographs by Talbot and Whiteman) Michael Joseph, 1987
- The Spirit of the Cotswolds, (photographs by Nick Meers), Michael Joseph, 1988
- Family, (Autobiography) Michael Joseph, 1989
- Reflections from a Garden, (Illustrated by Ian Stephens; written with Rory Stuart) Pavilion Books 1995
- Howards End is on the Landing Profile Books, 2009
- Jacob's Room is Full of Books: A Year of Reading , Profile Books, 2017

== Plays ==
- The Cold Country and Other Plays for Radio (includes The End of Summer, Lizard in the Grass, Consider the Lilies, Strip Jack Naked); London, BBC Publications, 1975.
- Lizard in the Grass, broadcast 1971; produced Edinburgh, 1988
- On the Face of It, broadcast 1975; published in Act 1, edited by David Self and Ray Speakman, London, Hutchinson, 1979
- The Ramshackle Company (for children); produced London, 1981
- Chances, broadcast 1981; produced London, 1983.

== Children's stories ==
- One Night at a Time, Hamish Hamilton 1984; Puffin 1986
- Mother's Magic, Hamish Hamilton 1985; Puffin 1986
- Can it be True?; (illustrated by Angela Barrett) Hamish Hamilton 1987; Puffin 1988; Walker Books 1990
- Susie's Shoes, (illustrated by Priscilla Lamont), Hamish Hamilton 1989; Puffin 1990
- Stories from Codling Village, (illustrated by Caroline Crosland) Walker Books 1990
- I've Forgotten Edward, Walker Books and Sainsbury's 1990
- I Won't Go there Again, Walker Books 1990
- Pirate Poll (illustrated by Priscilla Lamont), Hamish Hamilton 1991; Puffin 1992
- The Glass Angels, Walker Books 1991, Paperback 1993
- Beware, Beware, (illustrated by Angela Barrett), Walker Books 1993, Paperback 1994
- King of King's, (illustratedb by John Lawrence), Walker Books 1994
- The Christmas Collection: An Anthology (illustrated: John Lawrence), Walker Books 1995
- The Battle for Gullywith, 2008
