= Adventures in Stationery =

History of office supplies

Adventures in Stationery: A Journey Through Your Pencil Case
- Author: James Ward
- Language: English
- Genre: Non-fiction
- Publisher: Profile Books
- Publication date: 11 September 2014
- Publication place: United Kingdom
- Pages: 280
- ISBN: 978-1-84668-615-3

Adventures in Stationery: A Journey Through Your Pencil Case is a non-fiction book by James Ward about stationery. It was published by British publisher Profile Books in 2014. The book presents the history of various stationery items, such as the ballpoint pen, glue stick, and paperclip.

== Synopsis ==
In Adventures in Stationery, James Ward presents the history of numerous items of stationery, integrated with his personal opinions and current trends. Some of the topics discussed include the invention of the ballpoint pen by László Bíró, the development of the Pritt glue stick, the design of the paperclip, the shape of Stabilo highlighters, the possible uses of Blu-Tack, and urban legends about the development of ballpoint pens during the Space Race.

== Reception ==
Andrew Martin of The Observer wrote in a review that Adventures in Stationery is "elegantly written, but in a strangely blank, glassy-eyed tone" and opined that although Ward's personal anecdotes were interesting, more interviews with other subjects should have been included in the book. In a review for the Financial Times, Alexander Gilmour wrote that "Ward writes with a blend of wit, unhealthy obsession and pure love" and described the book as "high-class pornography for the stationery enthusiast". The Independent's Rhodri Marsden commented that the book "certainly is serious, while frequently frivolous", referring to its contents as "fascinating". Alex Sarll of the Irish Examiner summarised the book as a "chatty, witty treasure-trove" of facts and believed it "deserves a wider audience" than just stationery fans. Ben Richardson, who gave the book 2 out of 5 stars in a review for the South China Morning Post, felt that it was little more than "a laundry list of 'fancy that!' factoids" and that Ward should have integrated more "interactions with real people".
