= Britannica.com =

Online edition of Encyclopædia Britannica

- Screenshot Screenshot of Britannica.com on 26 June 2025
- Website type: Online encyclopaedia
- Available in: British English
- Headquarters: Chicago, United States
- Owner: Encyclopædia Britannica, Inc.
- Editor: Jason Tuohey
- Website: britannica.com
- Commercial: Yes
- Content licence: All rights reserved
- ISSN: 1085-9721

Britannica.com is the domain name of the main website of Encyclopædia Britannica, which provides partial free access to the paid online edition of the encyclopaedia, titled Encyclopaedia Britannica. The paid edition is known as Britannica Academic, previously Britannica Online. It is published by Encyclopædia Britannica, Inc., which is based in Chicago, Illinois.

== Content and features ==
As of 2025, Britannica.com had over 130,000 different entries covering a wide variety of topics. As of 2011, these articles have edit histories, providing a summary of information such as when the article was created, who has edited it, and when the article was last updated. The bottom of entries includes links to external websites. It includes search bar allowing navigation to specific entries.

The site has a rotating selection of articles prominently featured on the main page that are changed on a regular basis. As of 2011, it also includes access to multimedia including tens of thousands of images as well as thousands of videos, animations and audio clips. The website also includes a selection of online games. In 2000, in addition to the main encyclopedia text, Britannica.com was reported to include "current news, an internet guide that ranks Websites, the Merriam-Webster Dictionary and additional tools".

== History ==
Britannica was first launched online in 1994 as eb.com, which required a paid subscription to access, originally for institutions $1 per year per full time enrolled student, or slightly later $150 a year for individuals. While at launch the Britannica Online had all of the articles of its print counterpart, due to speed limitations of the early internet, early online versions of the Britannica were sparse in images and multimedia compared to the book and CD-ROM versions of the encyclopaedia. The 1994 launch happened at the end of several years of dramatic decline in sales of the print edition of the Britannica (which had dropped from 117,000 in 1990 to 51,000 in 1994), as well as other print encyclopedias, due to the emergence of competing electronic alternatives, such as the CD-ROM based Microsoft Encarta.

In 1999, the free website Britannica.com was launched, which contained the full text of the encyclopedia, as well as "an Internet search engine, subject channels, current events, and essays". The website was so popular that it crashed on several occasions following launch. Britannica.com later offered a subscription fee to remove advertising. eb.com was initially retained alongside Britannica.com for institutional subscribers such as schools and libraries. In 2000, the subscription price was $85 a year. While Britannica.com was initially completely free to use and supported by advertising, it reduced the amount of freely available content on the website after 2001 due to financial difficulties. By 2012, it had put up a partial paywall, requiring a subscription to fully access the website's content. In 2001, Wikipedia launched. By 2003, it had already matched Britannica's internet traffic. Around 2009, Britannica began allowing users to provide suggestions to modify/correct Britannica.com entries and briefly allowed users who had subject matter expertise to create their own Britannica entries, which would be checked and approved/denied by Britannica staff.

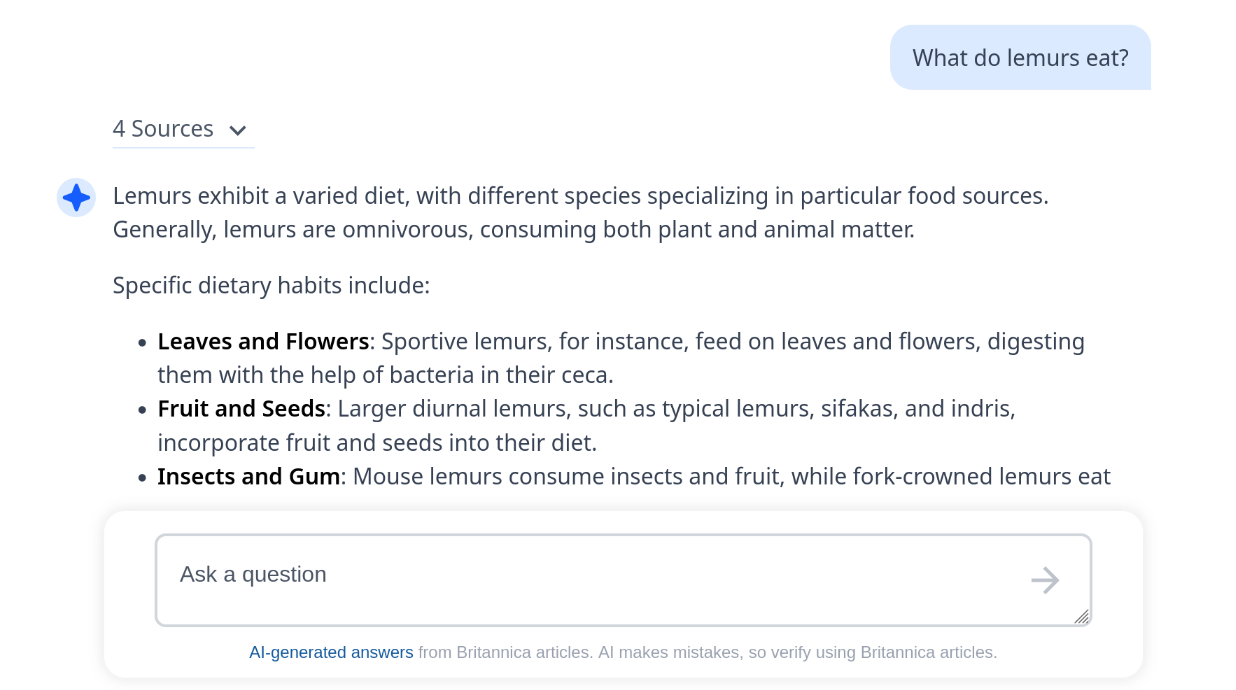
Example of an interaction with Britannica.com's AI chatbot

As of 2009, roughly 60% of Encyclopædia Britannica's revenue came from online operations, of which around 15% came from subscriptions to the consumer version of the websites. In 2012 Britannica Inc. discontinued the print edition of the Encyclopaedia Britannica, leaving the Britannica.com as the main version of the encyclopedia. On 7 June 2018, Britannica released a Google Chrome extension, "Britannica Insights", which shows snippets of information from Britannica Online whenever the user performs a Google Search, in a box to the right of Google's results. In 2024, the website began incorporating AI features, such as a large language model-based chatbot as part of the early 2020s AI boom. Britannica saw its traffic decline by nearly a third from 2022 to 2025, from 69.5 million visits to 47.4 million visits in the month of March in those years (for comparison, Wikipedia was getting roughly 128 to 226 million views every day in 2025 on average). In September 2025 and March 2026, Britannica filed lawsuits against AI companies Perplexity and OpenAI, respectively, alleging they had infringed its copyright by copying hundreds of thousands of its articles without permission for training data and information retrieval, which Britannica claimed is used to provide summaries which obviates the need to visit Britannica's website, which Britannica alleged has caused it to lose subscription and advertising revenue.

== Reception ==
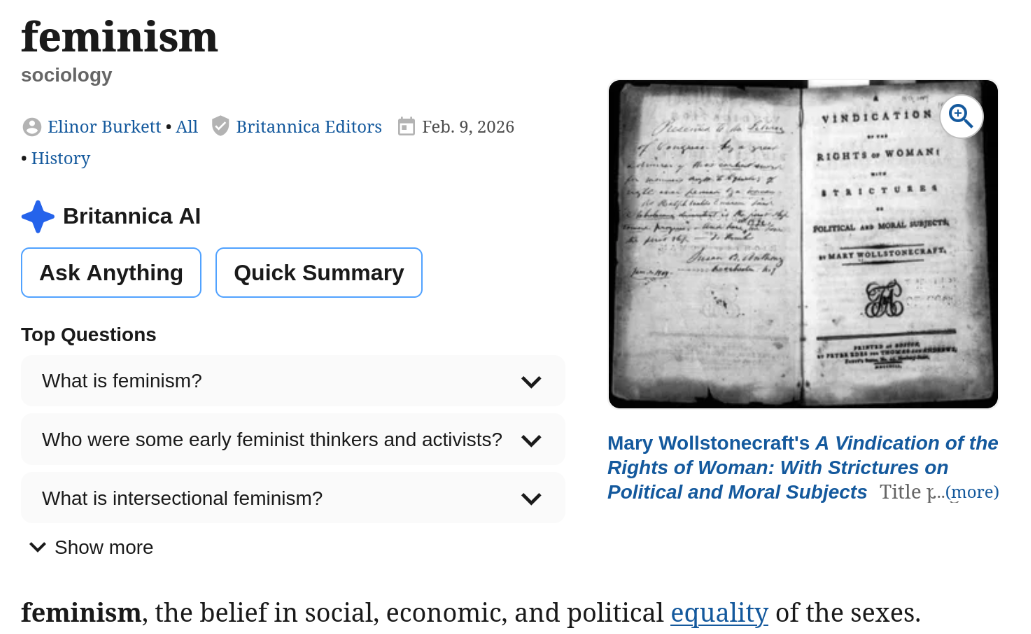
Screenshot of the website's article on feminism

Robert Rossney, writing in Wired shortly after the launch of eb.com in 1995, was sceptical of the need of encyclopedias in the internet age, stating: "Given that the Web itself is becoming the sum of the world's knowledge, isn't putting the Encyclopaedia Britannica online a spectacularly useless thing to do?"

A 2000 review by librarian Barbara M. Bibel in The Charleston Advisor described both the then-separate Britannica.com and Britannica Online as "one of the best encyclopedic sites on the Web, especially in terms of the written content", and suggested that they had "good basic searching including simple and advanced search modes", although she criticised the lack of multimedia content compared to the DVD version. She did not think that content provided by the paid version of Britannica Online was sufficiently different from the content offered by the free to access Britannica.com to justify a subscription. A later 2011 review by Lizah Ismail in the same publication, by which time the two services were merged, was positive about the paid version (the institutional Britannica Academic and personal Britannica Premium had almost identical content), stating that they offered "good 'first stop' resources from encyclopedia entries, relevant Web sites, and e-books and primary sources, as well as full-text access to scholarly journals for further research", but was more critical of the free version, stating that it was "inundated with advertising that does appear excessive and could be quite annoying and distracting to some." and only provided access to the first 100 words of most articles.

In a 2015 retrospective study on reactions to the 2012 announcement of the print edition of the Britannica ceasing publication, it was noted that the wider reactions gave off the impression that "encyclopedia would cease to exist entirely" rather than just be online only, with most reader comments on The New York Times articles on the subject observed to have "primarily referred to [the Britannica] as a print source, a set of books, first and foremost and as such it ceases to exist – at least it ceases to be ‘alive' [if it ceases to be printed]. ... With few exceptions, the reader comments do not consider the existence of Encyclopaedia Britannica online at all", which the authors of the study suggested reflected the diminished cultural relevance of the Britannica's current online incarnation compared to its historical book form. Simon Garfield described Britannica.com in his 2022 book All the Knowledge in the World as "not a bad place to hang out for a while. There is a lot of information one doesn’t need to pay for, and a neat home page displayed as a sort of historical newspaper, with stories on the Cuban Missile Crisis and the Cold War, a good array of quizzes and crosswords, and an 'On This Day ...' column", and suggested that the Britannica is probably considerably more read as an online encyclopaedia in the Internet age than it ever was as a written book, even if numerically dwarfed by Wikipedia in traffic.

=== 2005 Nature study vs Wikipedia ===
In 2005, the journal Nature chose articles from Britannica.com and Wikipedia in a wide range of science topics and sent them to what it called "relevant" field experts for peer review. The experts then compared the competing articles—one from each site on a given topic—side by side, but were not told which article came from which site. Nature got back 42 usable reviews. The journal found just eight serious errors, such as general misunderstandings of vital concepts: four from each site. It also discovered many factual errors, omissions or misleading statements: 162 in Wikipedia and 123 in Britannica, an average of 3.86 mistakes per article for Wikipedia and 2.92 for Britannica.

Although Britannica was revealed as the more accurate encyclopaedia, with fewer errors, in its rebuttal it called Nature's study flawed and misleading and called for a "prompt" retraction. It noted that two of the articles in the study were taken from a Britannica yearbook and not the encyclopaedia, and another two were from Compton's Encyclopedia (called the Britannica Student Encyclopedia on the company's website). Nature defended its story and declined to retract, stating that, as it was comparing Wikipedia with the web version of Britannica, it used whatever relevant material was available on Britannica's website.

== See also ==
- Online encyclopedia

== Bibliography ==
- Adefolalu, Opetoritse A. (2024). "Ready-Reference Sources". In Wong, Melissa A.; Saunders, Laura (eds.). Reference and Information Services: An Introduction. Bloomsbury Publishing USA. ISBN 979-8-216-17070-9.
- Kraus, Cvijeta; Jermen, Nataša; Jecić, Zdenko (2020). "An insight into online encyclopaedias for children and young adults". 7th International Conference The Future of Information Sciences INFuture2019: Knowledge in the Digital Age. Department of Information and Communication Sciences, Faculty of Humanities and Social Sciences, University of Zagreb, Croatia. pp. 167–180. doi:10.17234/infuture.2019.
