= The Front Room =

2024 American film by the Eggers Brothers

- Theatrical release poster
- Directed by: Max Eggers; Sam Eggers
- Screenplay by: Max Eggers; Sam Eggers
- Based on: "The Front Room" by Susan Hill
- Produced by: Babak Anvari; Lucan Toh; David Hinojosa; Julia Oh
- Starring: Brandy; Andrew Burnap; Neal Huff; Kathryn Hunter
- Cinematography: Ava Berkofsky
- Edited by: Benjamin Rodriguez Jr.; Eric Kissack
- Music by: Marcelo Zarvos
- Production companies: Two & Two Pictures; 2AM
- Distributed by: A24
- Release date: September 6, 2024
- Running time: 94 minutes
- Country: United States
- Language: English
- Box office: $3.8 million

The Front Room is a 2024 American psychological horror film written and directed by the Eggers Brothers, in their feature film debut, based on the 2016 short story of the same name by Susan Hill. The film stars Brandy, Kathryn Hunter, Andrew Burnap, and Neal Huff.

The Front Room was released in the United States by A24 on September 6, 2024. The film received mixed reviews from critics.

== Plot ==
Heavily pregnant anthropology professor Belinda is frustrated with treatment by her department, sleepwalking at night from anxiety, and still grieving from the loss of her stillborn first son, Wallace. One evening, Belinda's husband Norman receives a phone call from a mysterious number, which turns out to be his estranged ailing stepmother Solange, who had called to inform him about his dying father.

Norman refuses to visit his family, never revealing Solange’s religious abuse to Belinda. After quitting her job, Belinda comes home to news from Norman that his father has died. The couple goes to the funeral, and Belinda is introduced to Solange at the church wherein she proposes to the couple a deal: they accommodate her last days in their home, and they get her hefty inheritance. Being financially unstable, Norman reluctantly agrees.

While moving in, Solange takes the front room, which was initially converted into a nursery for their new daughter. Soon after moving in, Belinda begins to experience racial and religious microaggressions from Solange, who also carries a Daughters of the Confederacy certificate. Norman informs Belinda that Solange believes the Holy Spirit possesses her, inducing her into trance-like states. Solange disapproves of the couple’s new baby name “Fern” and after speaking in tongues, suggests she be renamed Laurie after Norman's father Lawrence.

While praying one night, Solange seemingly spiritually induces Belinda into labor, giving birth via caesarean section. After Belinda gives birth, she returns home to her house being refurnished with Solange’s own furniture, including Norman’s father’s ashes, and her ultra-religious prayer circle gathered in their living room, who begin to intensely pray over Belinda and Laurie. Solange admits that Norman had agreed to the refurnishing and the gatherings without telling Belinda, much to her frustration. While in her bedroom, Belinda is shocked to see her surgical scar completely healed. It is implied Solange's prayer circle healed Belinda's incision.

After an extensive argument, Solange throws herself against a table, convincing Norman that Belinda pushed her. Pastor Lewis stops by to check on the family, and accidentally reveals Solange had already paid off the mortgage of the house in full. Stuck at home alone between caring for a frequently incontinent Solange and Laurie refusing to latch and crying extensively, Belinda begins having increasingly strange dreams and hallucinations. Laurie also grows more attached to Solange than to Belinda, and Norman begins to become more protective of Solange. Things come to a head when Norman is angered by a bite mark on Laurie’s arm, but Belinda convinces him that it was Solange, noting the missing tooth mark. Norman finally stands up to Solange, who spends the rest of the night loudly pleading for her death. The couple wake up the next morning to Solange dead in her bedroom, and promptly cremate her. Laurie finally latches to Belinda.

Months later, the family are newly wealthy and moving into a new home. Belinda has Norman throw out Solange's chair. Belinda, now pregnant with twins, drives to a job interview singing "Non, je ne regrette rien" by Edith Piaf. At the interview for a new position, the dean asks her how she was able to deal with her previous situation; a flashback reveals Belinda smothering Solange to death.

== Cast ==
- Brandy as Belinda
- Kathryn Hunter as Solange
- Andrew Burnap as Norman
- Neal Huff as Pastor Lewis

== Production ==
On August 25, 2022, it was reported Max and Sam Eggers, brothers of Robert Eggers, would write and direct The Front Room, a psychological horror film starring Brandy, Kathryn Hunter and Andrew Burnap. The film is based on the short story of the same name by Susan Hill, published in her 2016 collection The Travelling Bag and Other Ghostly Stories. Filming took place in August and September 2022 in New Jersey, including at a house in Boonton, an office building in Parsippany–Troy Hills, and Fairleigh Dickinson University in Florham Park. In mid-February 2023, Screen Daily reported that the film was in post-production.

== Release ==
=== Theatrical ===
The Front Room was released by A24 in the United States on September 6, 2024, and by Universal Pictures in the United Kingdom on October 25, 2024.

=== Home media ===
The film was released on premium video on demand (PVOD) on September 24, 2024. It began streaming on Max on January 3, 2025.

== Reception ==
=== Box office ===
In the United States and Canada, The Front Room was released alongside Beetlejuice Beetlejuice, and was initially projected to gross around $5 million from 2,095 theaters in its opening weekend. The film made $600,000 on its first day, lowering weekend estimates to $1.5 million. It went on to debut to $1.7 million, finishing 10th at the box office.

=== Critical response ===
On the review aggregator website Rotten Tomatoes, 40% of 70 critics' reviews are positive, with an average rating of 4.9/10. The website's consensus reads: "The Front Room gets some mileage out of Kathryn Hunter's memorably grotesque turn as an in-law from hell, but the scatological scares in this family squabble are more off-putting than frightening." Metacritic, which uses a weighted average, assigned the film a score of 49 out of 100, based on 22 critics, indicating "mixed or average" reviews. Audiences polled by CinemaScore gave the film an average grade of "C–" on an A+ to F scale, while those surveyed by PostTrak gave it a 43% overall positive score, with 34% saying they would definitely recommend it.
