= Do Me a Favor =

Do Me a Favour, or Do Me a Favor (American English) may refer to:

- Do Me a Favour (novel), a 1963 novel by Susan Hill
- Do Me a Favor (film), a 1997 American film
- "Do Me a Favor", episode from Lotsa Luck American sitcom 1973–74

== Music ==
- "Do Me a Favor", song from Carrie musical
- "Do Me a Favour", song by Arctic Monkeys from Favourite Worst Nightmare album
- "Do Me a Favor" (song), a 2013 song by Stone Sour
- "Do Me a Favor", song by Vern Gosdin from Alone album
- "Do Me A Favor (Lets Play Holi)", a song by Anu Malik and Sunidhi Chauhan from the 2005 Indian film Waqt: The Race Against Time
