= The Boy Who Taught the Beekeeper to Read =

Book by Susan Hill

- First edition
- Author: Susan Hill
- Cover artist: Martin Scott-Jupp
- Language: English
- Publisher: Chatto and Windus
- Publication date: 2003
- Publication place: United Kingdom
- Media type: Print, audio & ebook
- Pages: 224
- ISBN: 0-7011-7596-6

The Boy Who Taught the Beekeeper to Read is a short story collection by British writer Susan Hill published in 2003 by Chatto & Windus (hardback) and the following year in paperback by Vintage Books. It "received long and favourable reviews in The Guardian (Hermione Lee), The Spectator (Francis King), The Sunday Times (Penelope Lively) and The Times Literary Supplement (Mark Cries).

== Stories ==
It contains nine stories :-

- "The Boy Who Taught the Beekeeper to Read": a schoolboy befriends the beekeeper at his aunt's country house and begins teaching him to read, but will the closeness last...
- "Father, Father": two sisters live with their recently widowed father and try to help him move on from his grief, but when he does they find themselves unable to cope...
- "Need": in a travelling circus troupe Biddy is dogged by Little Midge, the unnerving whistler as she visits her closest friend Rosa the fortune-teller one last time...
- "The Punishment": Mick's brother Charlie dies as a result of an accident whilst being punished in a Catholic School. Mick and his friends take seemingly dreadful revenge on God and the Church, but things do not go as they expect...
- "Moving Messages": two women once close friends meet after 34 years apart...
- "Sand": after their mother's funeral, two sisters recall of the only act of kindness they had ever seen from her when she helped a small boy with sand in his eyes...
- "Elizabeth": a mother warns her daughter against remaining at home when she grows up, which will end in a life of drudgery like herself, but instead to escape and see the world...
- "The Brooch": Rima's uncle is blind but few people realise this as with his dog and fixed routine he works as a commercial traveller selling hosiery in the city where he knows every customer and remembers every order. But then he buys Rosa a gift...
- "Antonyin's": an Englishman is posted to Vldansk, a bleak Eastern European town; he struggles with the food until he discovers Antonyin's, a cafe serving perfect food. But then he is targeted by a determined woman who sees marriage to him as an escape to the West...

== Reception ==
- Francis King writing in The Spectator is fulsome in his praise beginning his review: "This collection of nine stories, less than 50,000 words in length, is light in the hand. It is, however, a work of impressive substance", later he writes, "Hill can evoke a setting, convey the essence of a situation and let one see into the inmost hearts of her characters in a paragraph or even a single sentence." and he finishes with "The miraculous economy of these tales, their clear-sighted understanding of the transitoriness of human affections and loyalties, and their sense of the mysteriousness at the centre of the most simple and ordinary of lives, continually made me think of Chekhov. What could be higher praise than that?"
- Hermione Lee of The Guardian is also positive, she writes "The pleasure to be had from this small book of subdued stories lies in their carefulness: memories are exactly sustained, small gifts are valued, little words are listened to, advice - whether wanted or unwanted - settles in the mind".

== See also ==
- List of works by Susan Hill
