= A Bit of Singing and Dancing =

1973 short story collection by Susan Hill

- First edition (publ. Hamish Hamilton)
- Author: Susan Hill
- Language: English
- Publisher: Hamish Hamilton
- Publication date: 1973
- Publication place: United Kingdom
- Media type: Print (Hardcover)

A Bit of Singing and Dancing is a short story collection by British writer Susan Hill. It was published in 1973 in the United Kingdom and reissued along with In the Springtime of the Year in the United States in 1984. The stories mainly focus on tyranny and freedom.

A 1984 book review by Kirkus Reviews of two short story collections by Hill, concluded; "Like Hill's other stories, these are tales of thwarted passions and odd couples—with the mixture of pathos and charm at its best in the title story." The book has been described as "a vivid picture of the loneliness of old age".
