= James Ward (writer) =

English writer

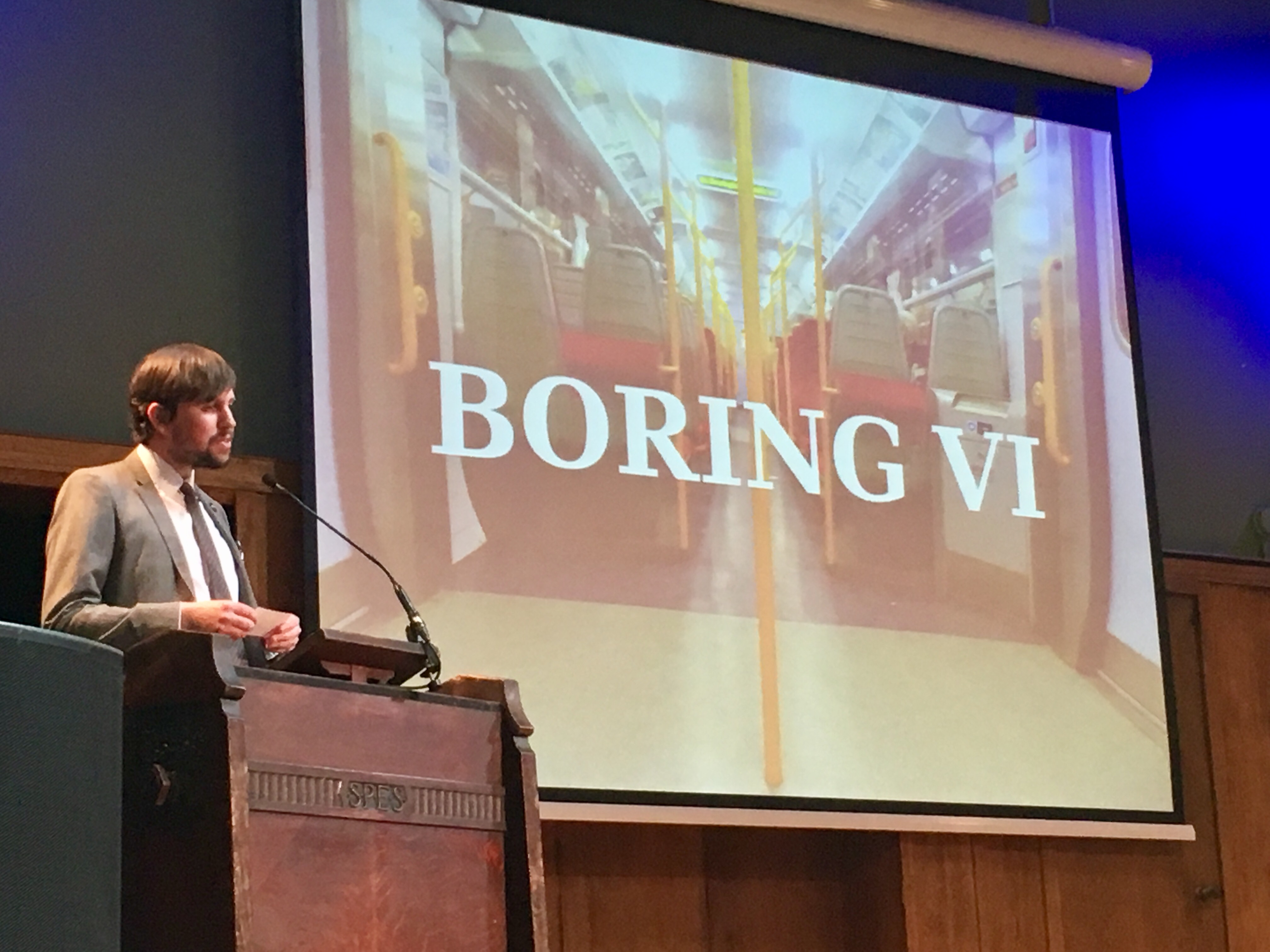
- Ward at Boring Conference, May 2016
- Born: April 2, 1981 (age 44) England
- Occupation: Writer; podcaster; conference founder
- Genre: Non-fiction, essays
- Subject: Stationery, the mundane, cultural history
- Years active: 2009–present
- Notable works: Adventures in Stationery (2014)

James Ward (born 2 April 1981) is an English writer and the founder of Boring Conference.

== Early work ==
Ward first came to prominence in 2009 with a blog that charted his fascination with "small unimportant things". The London Twirls Project, his attempt to map the availability, pricing and storage conditions of Cadbury's Twirls in Central London, led to him giving talks at public events such as Ignite and The Lost Lectures.

In 2010, he won a competition run by Virgin Atlantic and was flown to America to write a pen-based comparison of London and New York.

== Writing career ==
=== Adventures in Stationery ===
Ward's first book, Adventures in Stationery: A Journey Through Your Pencilcase, was published in the UK by Profile Books in 2014. Described as "high class pornography for the stationery enthusiast", it received generally positive reviews in the British press. It has been translated into Korean, Japanese and Chinese.

Adventures in Stationery was rewritten for the North American market and released in 2015 with the alternative title The Perfection of the Paperclip: Curious Tales of Invention, Accidental Genius and Stationery Obsession. This was due to words such as "stationery" and "pencil case" not commonly being part of the American English vocabulary. It was published by Simon and Schuster.

=== Journalism ===
Ward has written for The Guardian, The Wall Street Journal, The Daily Telegraph, and New Humanist, amongst others.

== Boring Conference ==
Inspired by the cancellation of Interesting Conference, Ward founded Boring Conference in 2010. The conference describes itself as "A one-day celebration of the mundane, the ordinary, the obvious and the overlooked". Speakers at the conference give short talks on a wide variety of "boring" topics, which have previously included sneezing, toast, IBM tills, the Shipping Forecast, and barcodes.

Past speakers include Jon Ronson, Josie Long, Rhodri Marsden, Adam Curtis and Greg Stekelman. An unexpected success, the event regularly sells out minutes after tickets go on sale. The most recent Boring Conference – Boring VIII – took place at Conway Hall on 5 May 2018.

=== The Boring Talks Podcast ===
In 2017, Ward made The Boring Talks Podcast in collaboration with the BBC. Available as a weekly download from January 2018, each podcast consists of a talk on a single subject that would generally be considered 'boring', such as 'yellow lines' and 'book pricing algorithms'.

== Other projects ==
=== Public speaking ===
Ward regularly gives talks on Boring Conference, the minutiae of everyday life, the nature of boredom and the joys of stationery. He has spoken at IBTM World in Barcelona, Secret Garden Party, Kings Place in London, the Hay Literary Festival and Nerd Nite. He appears in airline JetBlue's in-flight video "HumanKinda" and as a guest on podcasts Little Atoms and The Allusionist.

=== Stationery Club ===
In 2010, Ward co-founded Stationery Club, a regular gathering where people would meet in a pub to discuss which pen they were using at the moment.

=== The Concept Album Talks ===
In 2015, Ward co-founded and hosted The Concept Album Talks with Hamish Thompson. Each event centres around a different concept album. Speakers give a talk inspired by the title of one track of that album that must last for the same duration as the song. Albums covered so far are The Dark Side of the Moon and Pet Sounds.
