= Glue stick =

Solid adhesive in a twist or push-up tube

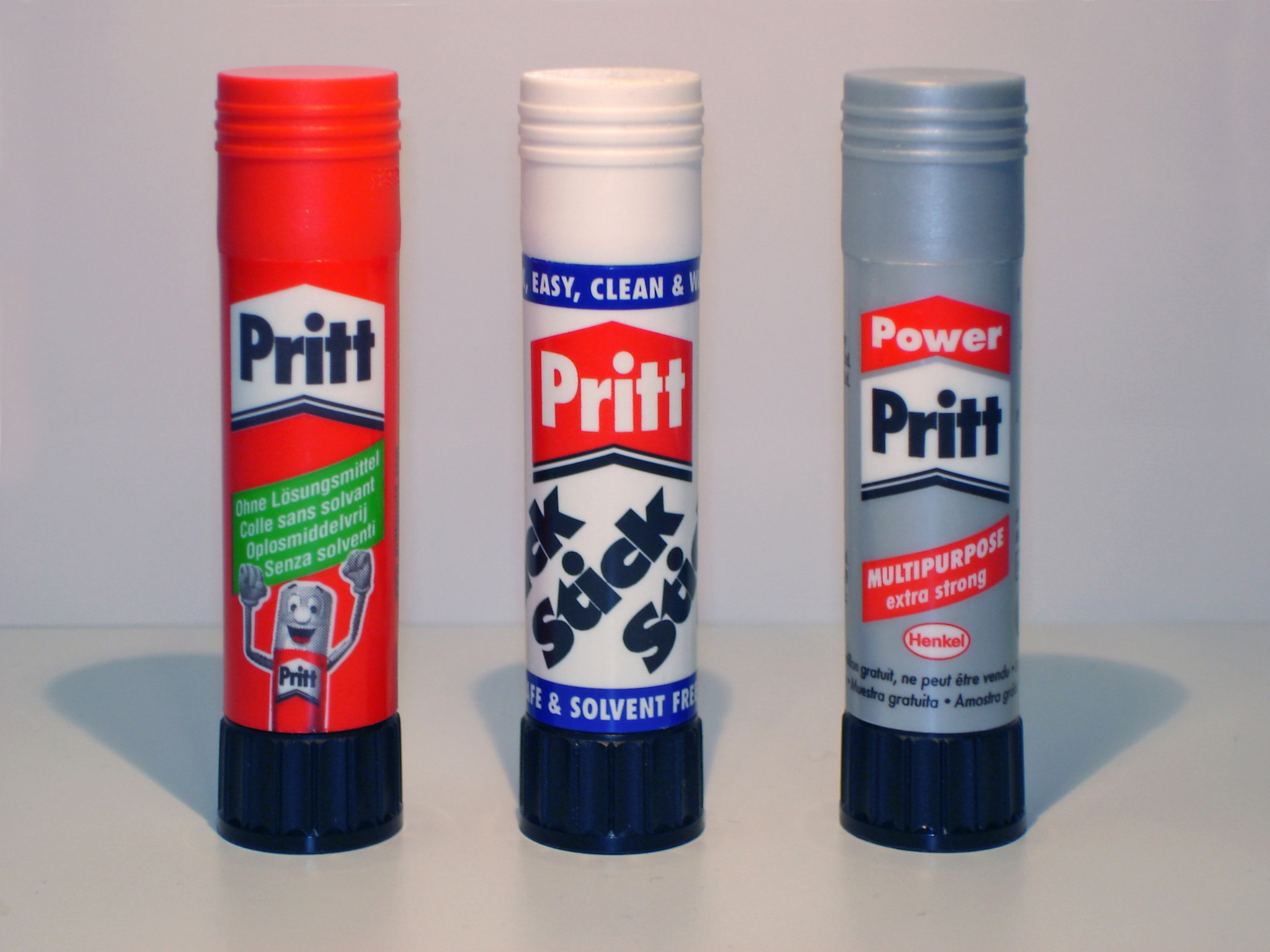
A selection of glue sticks manufactured by Pritt; "Pritt Stick (International version)", "Pritt Stick (UK version)" and Extra Strong "Power Pritt"

Glue sticks are solid and hard adhesives in twist or push-up tubes often used for arts and crafts. Users can apply glue by holding the open tube to keep their fingers clean and rubbing the exposed stick against a surface.

== Applications ==
Most glue sticks are designed to glue card stock and paper together and are not as strong as some liquid-based variants. They can be used for craft and design, office use, and at school. There are several varieties: permanent, washable, acid-free, non-toxic, solvent-free, and dyed (e.g. to see where the glue is being applied).

== Brands ==
In 1969, the German company Henkel invented the glue stick after studying the "twist-up ease" and convenience of lipstick applicators. The product was released under the Pritt Stick brand. By 1971 the Pritt Stick was being sold in 38 countries, and by 2001 in 121. The first solvent-free, multipurpose glue stick that could be used for other materials (e.g. wood, glass, and some plastics) was the "PowerPritt", which was put on the market in 2003. There is also a "Pritt X", launched in 2010.

In the UK, the name "Pritt Stick" is often used synonymously for any glue stick but this usage seems to be falling out of use.

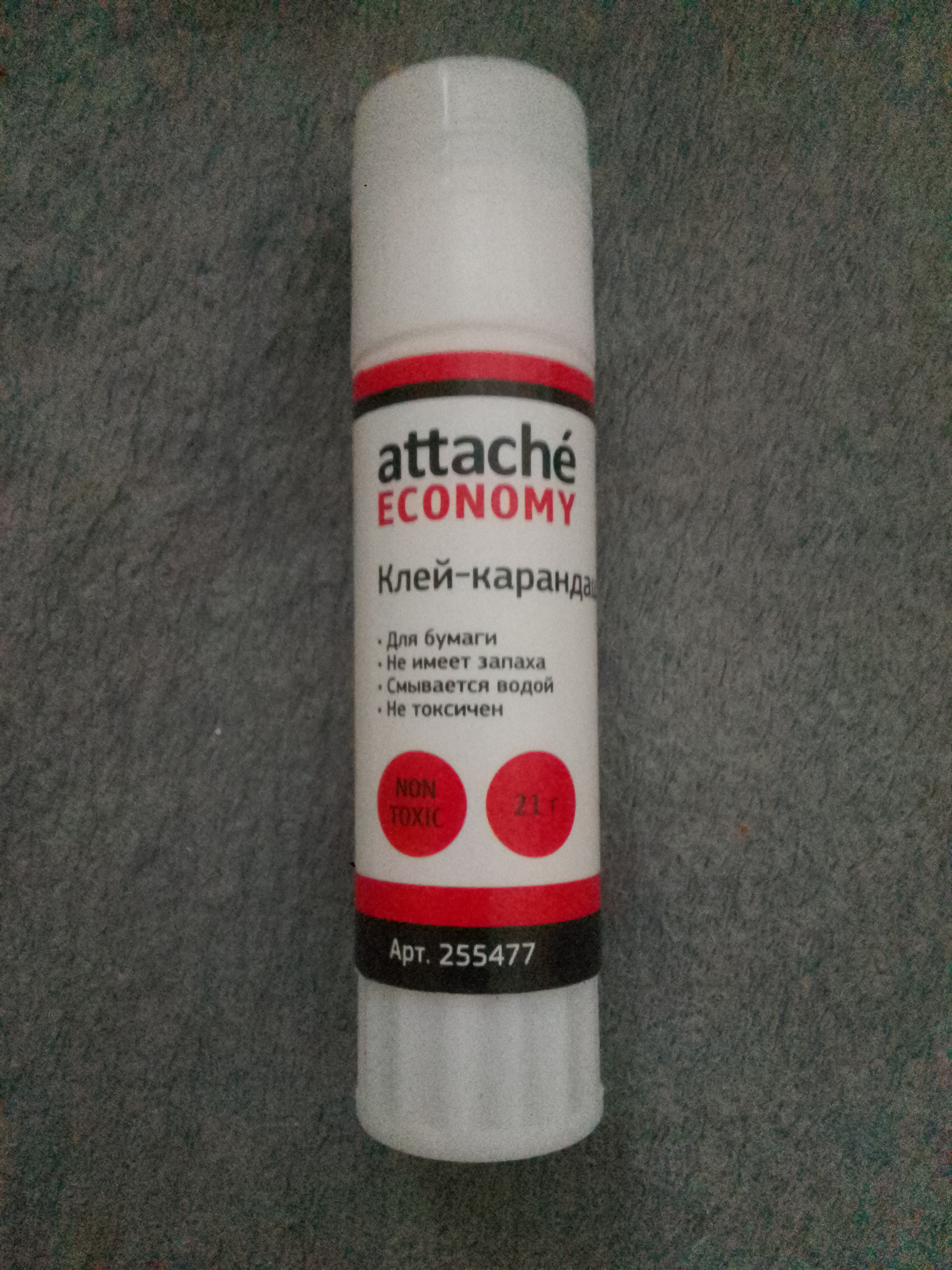
Glue Stick made in Russia

Glue sticks are made under many brands and each may have different features to it. Various brands, such as Scotch, Elmer's, UHU, Kores, Giotto, Snopake, and Bostik U-Stick make glue sticks. Generic brands like M&G also manufacture glue sticks, utilizing the twist action.

== Sizes ==
Glue sticks can come in many sizes. The most common ones are: 8g, 11g, 22g, 25g, 36g, and 43g.

== Material ==
Known primary materials used in glue sticks are PVA or PVP.

== Composition ==
Glue stick compositions are often proprietary and vary by manufacturer and type. The 3M product contains the following ingredients:

Name	% content	Purpose
Water	40%	Evaporates to allow the glue to dry.
Acrylic polymer	40%	Polymerizes to solidify dried glue.
Sodium stearate	10%	This soap helps emulsify the acrylic, and lubricates the glue to apply smoothly.
Polyethylene glycol	3%	Keeps dried glue somewhat moist and flexible.
Polyoxyethylene monooctylpphenyl ether	2%	Emulsifier.
N-Vinylpyrrolidone monomer	2%	Polymerizes as the glue dries.
2-amino isobutanol	2%	pH buffer, to neutralize acid.
Sodium hydroxide	0.3%	Alkali, to keep stick pH above 10.

The reportable composition of a Pritt Stick is as follows:

Name	EC number	CAS number	% content	Risk Statements
Caprolactam	203-313-2	105-60-2	1–5%	Xn;R20/22 Xi;R36/37/38
Hydrogen peroxide solution ...%	231-765-0	7722-84-1	<1%	O;R8 C;R34
Sodium hydroxide	215-185-5	1310-73-2	<1%	C;R35

Other brands use, e.g., polyvinylpyrrolidone (PVP) as the glue substance.
