= The Risk of Darkness =

2006 novel by Susan Hill

- First edition
- Author: Susan Hill
- Language: English
- Series: Simon Serrailler
- Publisher: Chatto & Windus
- Publication date: 1 Jun 2006
- Publication place: United Kingdom
- ISBN: 0-7011-7682-2
- Preceded by: The Pure in Heart
- Followed by: The Vows of Silence

The Risk of Darkness is a novel by Susan Hill. It is the third novel in the "Simon Serrailler" crime series.
