= Just My Type (book) =

2010 book by Simon Garfield

Just My Type: A Book About Fonts
- First edition (UK)
- Author: Simon Garfield
- Subject: Typography
- Publisher: Profile Books
- Publication date: 1 October 2010
- Media type: Print (Hardcover, paperback)
- Pages: 356
- ISBN: 978-1-59240-652-4
- OCLC: 706017795
- Dewey Decimal: 686.224
- LC Class: Z250 .G228 2011

Just My Type: A Book About Fonts is a non-fiction book by British journalist and author Simon Garfield. It consists of essays about popular typefaces and discusses the impact of typography on our daily lives. Themes covered in the book include why people dislike Comic Sans, Papyrus, and Trajan Capitals; the overwhelming European popularity of Helvetica; and how a font can make a person seem such a way, such as masculine, feminine, American, British, German, or Jewish.

== Overview ==
The first chapter, "We Don't Serve Your Type", is about why people dislike the font Comic Sans. Other widely disliked fonts are discussed in chapter 21, "The Worst Fonts in the World". Chapter 2, "Capital Offence", details font etiquette, while chapter 3, "Legibility vs. Readability", details the difference between a font being "legible" and a font being "readable." Chapters 4, "Can a font make me popular?"; 9, "What is it about the Swiss?"; 13, "Can a font be German, or Jewish?"; and 14, "American Scottish", detail how a font can make somebody or something look. Chapter 7, "Baskerville is Dead (Long Live Baskerville)", and various "fontbreaks" detail the histories of specific fonts.

== Critical reception ==
Reception of Just My Type by non-professional reviewers was overwhelmingly positive. The New York Times praised the book, saying that it "does for typography what Lynne Truss's best-selling Eats, Shoots & Leaves did for punctuation" and that it is a "smart, funny, and accessible book". BBC declared it a "well-written, anecdote-filled romp through the highs and lows of fontdom". The Guardian declared it "bouncy, well-informed, and wittily-designed".

On the other hand, historian of typography Paul Shaw, in a review of the US edition, while admitting the book is "full of fascinating stories and trivia about type" stated that "[u]nfortunately, many of these stories are incomplete or superficial and the trivia often more odd than informative". He goes on to list in detail numerous errors in the book.

Just My Type was named one of the Amazon.com Best Books of the Month for September 2011.
