= Profile Books =

British independent book publishing firm

- Founded: 1996; 30 years ago
- Founder: Andrew Franklin
- Country of origin: UK
- Headquarters location: London
- Distribution: The Book Service (UK); Consortium Book Sales & Distribution (US)
- Publication types: Books
- Fiction genres: Nonfiction, fiction
- Imprints: Serpent's Tail, The Clerkenwell Press, Tindal Street Press
- Official website: profilebooks.com

Profile Books is a British independent book publishing firm founded in 1996. It publishes non-fiction subjects including history, biography, memoir, politics, current affairs, travel and popular science.

Profile Books, a member of the Independent Alliance, is sold and distributed in the UK by Hachette UK Distribution, part of Hachette Livre.

== History ==
In 2002 the company acquired the HarperCollins UK business list. The list now includes works by Robert Greene, Ryan Holiday, and Shoshana Zuboff.

In 2003 the company published Eats, Shoots & Leaves by Lynne Truss which was the bestselling non-fiction title for 30 weeks and the Book of the Year at the British Book Awards 2004, at which the company also won the Small Publisher of the Year award.

In January 2007 Profile Books acquired Serpent's Tail, bringing together two small publishers in London. In 2008, Profile set up an ethical imprint GreenProfile under the direction of Mark Ellingham, the founder of Rough Guides.

In 2012, Profile launched a new list with Wellcome Collection, designed to showcase writing about medicine, the body, and the human condition. Authors on the list include Val McDermid, Atul Gawande and Gavin Francis.

In October 2012 Profile acquired Birmingham-based independent Tindal Street Press.

Since 2014 Profile has published a boutique list of Tuskar Rock, editorially selected by Colm Tóibín and Peter Straus, which includes works by László Krasznahorkai and Chris Kraus (American writer).

In 2017 the first books were published in the new Pursuit Books imprint, a list showcasing writing on cycling.

== Notable publications ==
Authors include Anjana Ahuja, Alan Bennett, Susan Hill, Ian Stewart (mathematician), Jonathan Dimbleby, Sandi Toksvig, Simon Garfield, Robert Greene, Richard Mabey, Simon Jenkins, Margaret MacMillan, David Harvey, Federico Varese and Francesca Simon.

The company publishes all of The Economist books.

Jay Bahadur

- Deadly Waters (2011)

Alan Bennett

- The Lady in the Van (1999)
- Four Stories (2006)
- The Uncommon Reader (2007)
- A Life Like Other People's (2009)
- Smut (2011)
- Keeping On Keeping On 2017

Timothy Brook

- Vermeer's Hat: The Seventeenth Century and the Dawn of the Global World (2009)

Oliver Bullough

- Moneyland: The Inside Story of the Crooks and Kleptocrats Who Rule the World (2018)
- Butler to the World: How Britain became the servant of tycoons, tax dodgers, kleptocrats and criminals (2023)

Shaun Bythell (of Wigtown bookshop)

- The Diary of a Bookseller

Eugenia Cheng

- How to Bake Pi
- Beyond Infinity

Jonathan Dimbleby

- Destiny in the Desert (2012)

Simon Garfield

- Just My Type (2010)

Atul Gawande

- Being Mortal

Robert Greene

- The 48 Laws of Power (2000)
- Mastery (2012)
- The Laws of Human Nature (2018)

David Harvey

- The Enigma of Capital and the Crises of Capitalism (2011)
- Seventeen Contradictions and the End of Capitalism (2014)

Susan Hill

- The Man in the Picture (2007)
- The Small Hand (2010)
- Howards End is on the Landing (2010)
- Dolly: A Ghost Story (2012)
- Printer's Devil Court (2014)
- The Travelling Bag (2016)

Simon Jenkins

- A Short History of England (2011)
- England's 100 Best Views (2013)

Tracy Kidder

- Mountains Beyond Mountains (2011)

Patricia and Robert Malcolmson, Nella Last

- Nella Last in the 1950s (2010)

James A Robinson, Daron Acemoğlu

- Why Nations Fail (2013)

James Ward

- Adventures in Stationery (2014)

Richard Wrangham

- Catching Fire: How Cooking Made Us Human (2009)
- The Goodness Paradox (2019)

== Prizes ==
- Anquetil, Alone by Paul Fournel was shortlisted in two categories in the Sports Book Awards 2018
- Being Mortal by Atul Gawande was longlisted for the Baillie Gifford Prize 2014
- Catching Fire was shortlisted for the Samuel Johnson Prize in 2010
- Eats, Shoots & Leaves was Book of the Year at Specsavers National Book Awards 2004
- Frugal Innovation by Navi Radjou and Jaideep Prabhu won the CMI Management Book of the Year Award 2016
- Just My Type won Best British Book at the British Book Design and Production Awards 2011
- Moneyland was shortlisted for the 2019 Orwell Prize and named The Sunday Times Business Book of the Year 2018
- Mountains Beyond Mountains won a BMA Medical Book Award
- Nella Last in the 1950s was shortlisted for the Portico Prize in 2012
- Railways was The Sunday Times History Book of the Year 2015
- The Small Hand won a Best Jacket / Cover Design award at the British Book Design and Production Awards 2011
- Vermeer's Hat won the Mark Lynton History Prize in 2009
- Why Nations Fail won the Financial Times and Goldman Sachs Business Book of the Year Award in 2012

Profile Books has won the "Independent Publisher of the Year" awards three times. In 2017 The Essex Serpent (published in the Serpent's Tail imprint) was named the Fiction Book of the Year, the Book of the Year, and won Publicity Campaign of the Year Award at the British Book Awards.
