= The Mist in the Mirror =

1992 novel by Susan Hill

The Mist in the Mirror: A Ghost Story
- First edition
- Author: Susan Hill
- Language: English
- Publisher: Sinclair Stevenson
- Publication date: 1992
- Publication place: United Kingdom
- Pages: 224
- ISBN: 1-85619-167-2

The Mist in the Mirror: A Ghost Story is a novel by Susan Hill. The novel is about a traveller called Sir James Monmouth and his pursuit of an explorer called Conrad Vane.

== Reception ==
A 2014 book review by Kirkus Reviews called the novel "a glacially paced adventure" and concluded; "The eponymous mist seems to cloud the writing, and the meandering tale ends quickly with a conclusion that still seems obscure."
