= Andrew Burnap =

American actor (born 1991)

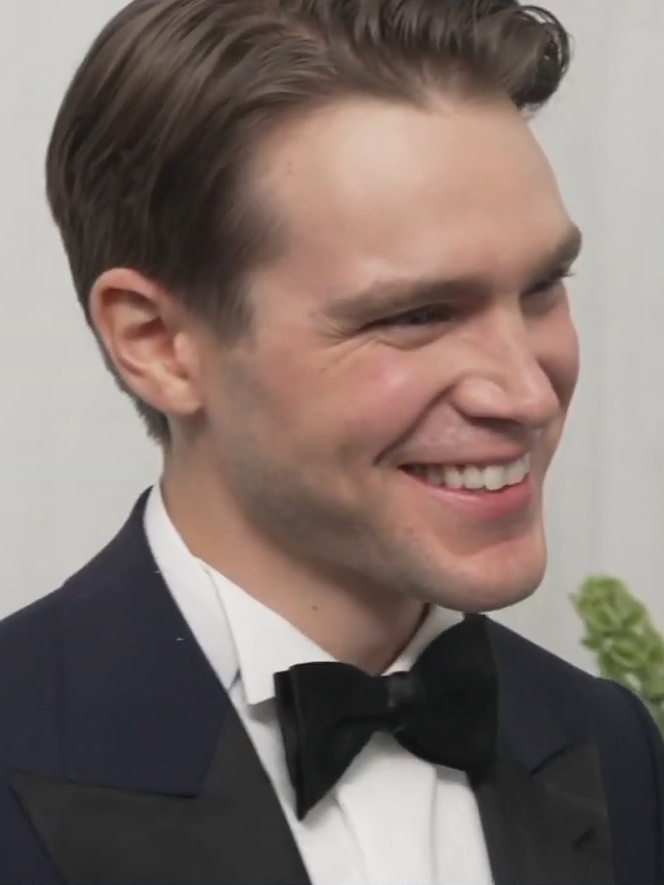
- Burnap at the 74th Tony Awards in 2021
- Born: March 5, 1991 (age 35); South Kingstown, Rhode Island, U.S.
- Education: University of Rhode Island (BFA); Yale University (MFA)
- Occupation: Actor
- Years active: 2014–present

Andrew Burnap (born March 5, 1991) is an American actor. Known for his performances on stage, he began his professional stage career in the Public Theatre's revivals of King Lear in 2014 and Troilus and Cressida in 2016. He gained prominence for his role as Toby Darling in the Matthew López play The Inheritance, which premiered in the West End and transferred to Broadway, and earned him the Tony Award for Best Lead Actor in a Play. In 2023, he portrayed King Arthur in the Broadway revival of the Lerner and Loewe musical Camelot.

Burnap is also known for his roles on television including as Phil in the Apple TV+ series WeCrashed (2022), and as Joseph Smith in the FX on Hulu limited series Under the Banner of Heaven (2022).

== Early life and education ==
Burnap was born and raised in South Kingstown, Rhode Island, and graduated from South Kingstown High School and the University of Rhode Island. He is the son of Allison and Tim Burnap.

== Career ==
Burnap started his career in productions from the Public Theatre. In 2014, he was part of the ensemble in the revival of King Lear starring John Lithgow, Annette Bening and Yahya Abdul-Mateen II. In 2016, he starred as Troilus in Troilus and Cressida. He gained prominence for his role as Toby Darling in the Matthew Lopez play The Inheritance, which premiered in the West End and transferred to Broadway, for which he won the Tony Award for Best Actor in a Play.

In 2022, Burnap starred as Phil in the Apple TV+ series WeCrashed opposite Anne Hathaway and Jared Leto, and as Joseph Smith in the FX on Hulu limited series Under the Banner of Heaven with Andrew Garfield and Daisy Edgar-Jones. In 2023, he portrayed King Arthur in the Broadway revival of the Lerner and Loewe musical Camelot. Burnap starred opposite Phillipa Soo as Guinevere in the revival with a new book by Aaron Sorkin. For his performance, he was nominated for the Drama Desk Award for Outstanding Lead Performance in a Musical.

Later that year, he portrayed Joris Ivens in the off-Broadway play Spain written by Jen Silverman, where he acted opposite Marin Ireland. The play revolves around the complications of filming a movie financed by the Russian government during the Spanish Civil War.

In 2025, he played Jonathan, a character based on Prince Charming, in the live-action Disney remake Snow White, where he starred opposite Rachel Zegler and Gal Gadot. He will next be seen in The Up and Comer where he plays a former classmate of the main protagonist.He will also be seen in the fourth season of the show The Gilded Age where he will play Porter.

== Acting credits ==
Key
†	Denotes films that have not yet been released

=== Film ===
Year	Title	Role	Notes
2016	The Layoff	Jeremy	Short film
2018	The Chaperone	Floyd	
2018	Spare Room	Matt	
2024	The Front Room	Norman	
2025	Snow White	Jonathan	
TBD	The Up and Comer	Tyler Mills	
2026	One Night Only	Max	

=== Television ===
Year	Title	Role	Notes
2018	Instinct	Henry	Episode: "Live"
2019	The Code	Sgt. Julian Lucas	Episode: "Smoke-Pit"
2021	Younger	Topher Clarke	Episode: "The Son Also Rises"
2021	The Good Fight	Max	Episode: "And the Détente Had an End..."
2022	WeCrashed	Phil	6 episodes
2022	Under the Banner of Heaven	Joseph Smith	5 episodes
2023	Dear Edward	Father Macelvoy	1 episode
2024	FBI Most Wanted	Gary Muscar	Episode “Aquarium Drinker”
2026	The Gilded Age	Porter	1 episode

=== Video games ===
Year	Title	Role	Notes
2018	Red Dead Redemption 2	Laramies	Voice only

=== Theatre ===
Year	Title	Role	Venue
2011	All's Well That Ends Well		Commonwealth Shakespeare Company
2012	Coriolanus		Commonwealth Shakespeare Company
2013	The Two Gentlemen of Verona	Valentine	Commonwealth Shakespeare Company
2013	Kiss Me, Kate	Bill Calhoun / Lucentio	Commonwealth Shakespeare Company
2014	King Lear	Ensemble	Delacorte Theater
2016	Troilus and Cressida	Troilus	Delacorte Theater
2016	This Day Forward		Vineyard Theatre
2017	The Legend of Georgia McBride	Casey	Geffen Playhouse
2018	The Inheritance	Toby Darling	Young Vic
2018	The Inheritance	Toby Darling	Noël Coward Theatre
2019–2020	The Inheritance	Toby Darling	Ethel Barrymore Theatre
2023	Camelot	King Arthur	Vivian Beaumont Theater
2023	Spain	Joris Ivens	Second Stage Theater
2025	Othello	Cassio	Ethel Barrymore Theatre

== Awards and nominations ==
Year	Award	Category	Work	Result	Ref.
2020	Clive Barnes Award	Theatre Artist Award	The Inheritance	Won	
2020	Tony Awards	Best Leading Actor in a Play	The Inheritance	Won	
2023	Drama Desk Awards	Outstanding Lead Performance in a Musical	Camelot	Nominated	
