= Anthony Quiney =

British architectural historian

Anthony Prosper Quiney (born 1935) is an architectural historian, building archaeologist, writer and photographer who has lived in Blackheath for many years. Dr. Quiney is Professor Emeritus of Architectural History at the University of Greenwich, a distinguished Fellow of the Society of Antiquaries of London and President Emeritus of the Royal Archaeological Institute. He has authored several books on the architectural history of England.

As a young boy, Quiney was evacuated from London during the rocket attacks of 1945, to the countryside near a U.S. military airfield, where an American aircrew took him around their B-17 Flying Fortress bomber. This led to a lifelong fascination with military aviation. As a young man, Quiney performed his national service as a radar technician in the Royal Air Force, and later in life he realised a dream of piloting a restored Supermarine Spitfire.

== Personal life ==
Quiney is the husband of Ginnie Hole; screenwriter for The House of Eliott, Casualty, The Bill, and many other television programmes.

A tall man with thick white hair, Quiney is sometimes seen with his Romanian Rescue dog Hera, on the heath in Blackheath or in Greenwich Park.

== Books ==
Books include:

- John Loughborough Pearson, 1979. ISBN 0-300-02253-0.
- House and Home: History of the Small English House, 1986. ISBN 0-563-21133-4.
- The English Country Town, 1987. ISBN 0-500-01405-1.
- Period Houses, a guide to authentic architectural features, 1989. ISBN 0-540-01173-8.
- Kent Houses: English Domestic Architecture, 1993. ISBN 1-85149-153-8.
- Wall to Wall, An exploration of building materials and domestic architecture, 1994. ISBN 1-86000-013-4.
- The Traditional Buildings of England, 1995. ISBN 0-500-27661-7
- Panoramas of English Villages, with Nick Meers. 2000. ISBN 978-1-85799-946-4.
- England's Architectural Heritage, 2002. ISBN 1-903807-23-9.
- Town Houses of Medieval Britain, 2004. ISBN 0-300-09385-3.
- A Year in the Life of Greenwich Park, 2009. ISBN 0-7112-2871-X.
- The Undone Years: a story of two families, 1907–1923, 2015.
