= Air and Angels =

1991 novel by Susan Hill

- First edition
- Author: Susan Hill
- Cover artist: Robert Mason
- Language: English
- Publisher: Sinclair Stevenson
- Publication date: 25 Mar 1991
- Publication place: United Kingdom
- Media type: Print, audio & ebook
- Pages: 288
- ISBN: 1-85619-052-8

Air and Angels is a novel by English author Susan Hill, her first for 16 years. It was first published in 1991 by Sinclair Stevenson and since republished by Vintage Books in 1999 who have also made it available as an ebook. It is said to contain some of her finest writing. The title is taken from a poem by John Donne.

== Plot introduction ==
The first half of the book comprises two separate narratives in set in Edwardian India and Cambridge.

In Cambridge the Revd Thomas Cavendish, a celibate and irreproachable university don in his mid-fifties, appears destined to become master of the college. He lives with his sister and is a confirmed bachelor, spurning the attentions of his sister's friend Florence who is determined to wed him. His enthusiasm is birds; spending his leisure time either on the Fens birdwatching, or in his indoor aviary.

In India, 15-year-old Kitty is becoming bored with ex-colonial life, and at the same time repelled by the poverty she sees nearby; she longs to return to the England she left as a young child. Eventually her parents relent and after a long sea voyage she arrives at her cousin Florence's house in Cambridge.

The second half of the book concerns Thomas Cavendish's growing obsession with Kitty after he sees her from his window, as she stands on a bridge over the river. Through his contacts with Florence he becomes her tutor, with disastrous results...

== Style and Reception ==
According to The Guardian, the 'highly stylised Air and Angels differs from her earlier novels in being 'more psychologically focussed, more poetically written', Christopher Wordsworth wrote "Victorian or early Georgian? Mundane precision has no great priority with this author, but with so many emotions at large some firm moorings might have helped. The theme, a constricted soul and the mirage of the Absolute, would defeat most writers. For all its unsparing intensity - perhaps because of it - it fails to convince, a judgement qualified by too many shining patches."

Laura Cumming from The Observer praises the novel as being 'light as a feather but as powerful as flight', she writes that 'Hill deploys old time conventions to express the astonishment of unconventional love with metaphors cut from the pattern...Her style is a gentle story-book prose, barely troubled by anything as adult as a dialogue, but the adult shock of amour fou is brilliantly evoked out of subtleties...Hill can make emotional eloquence out of a glass of sherry or a pair of sensible shoes, and Air and Angels, with its homage to Donne, is a passionate celebration.
