= Blu Tack =

Pressure-sensitive adhesive putty

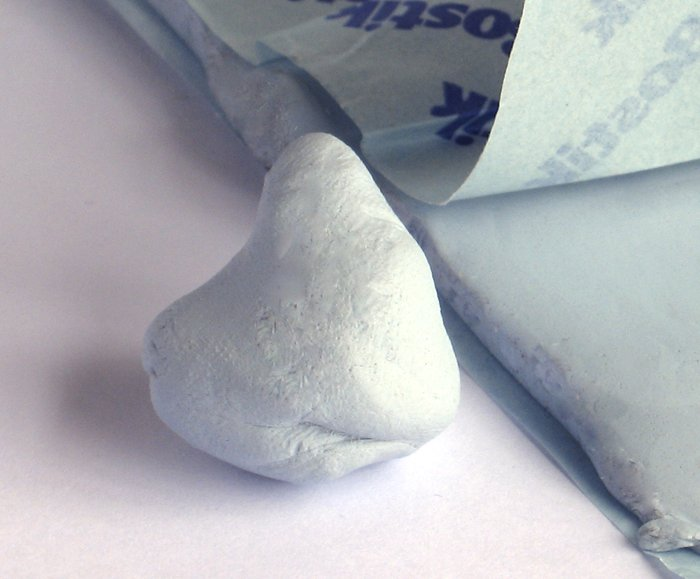
Blu Tack

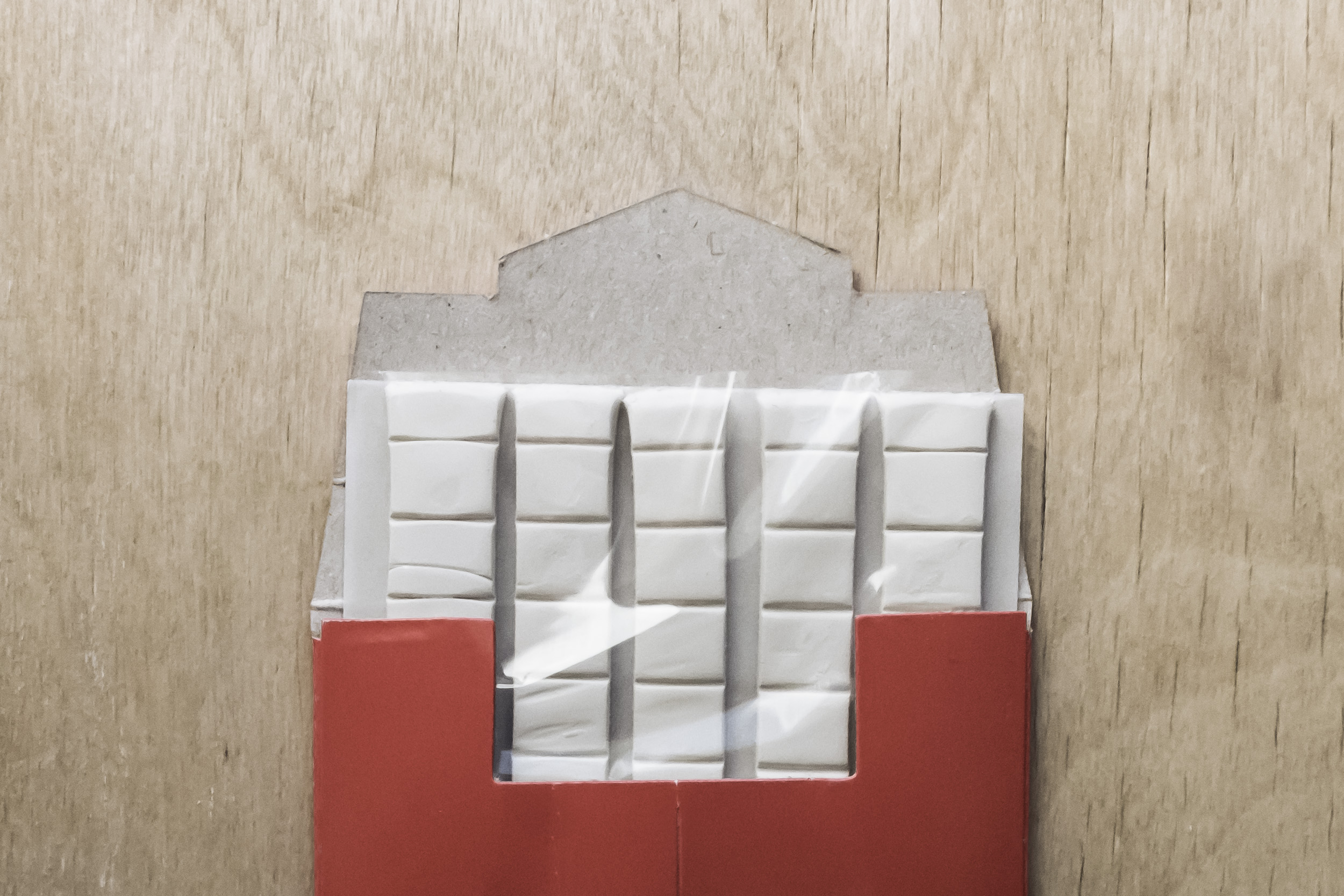
White Blu Tack out of the box

Blu Tack is a reusable putty-like pressure-sensitive adhesive produced by Bostik, commonly used to attach lightweight objects (such as posters or sheets of paper) to walls, doors or other dry surfaces. Traditionally blue, it is also available in other colours. Generic versions of the product are also available from other manufacturers. The spelling now used is without a hyphen.

As of 2015, Bostik was manufacturing around 100 tonnes of Blu Tack weekly at its Leicester factory.

== History ==
Blu Tack was originally developed in 1969 in Leicester.

While the inventor of the commercial Bostik product is unknown, a precursor was created around 1970 as an accidental by-product of an attempt to develop a sealant based on chalk powder, rubber and oil. Blu Tack was originally white, but following fears that children could mistake it for chewing gum, a blue colouring was added. Different colours of Blu Tack were introduced in 2003.

In the United Kingdom in March 2008, 20,000 numbered packs of pink Blu Tack were made available, to help raise money for Breast Cancer Campaign, with 10 pence from each pack going to the charity. The formulation was slightly altered to retain complete consistency with its blue counterpart. Since then, many coloured variations have been made, including red-and-white, yellow, and a green Halloween product.

== Composition ==
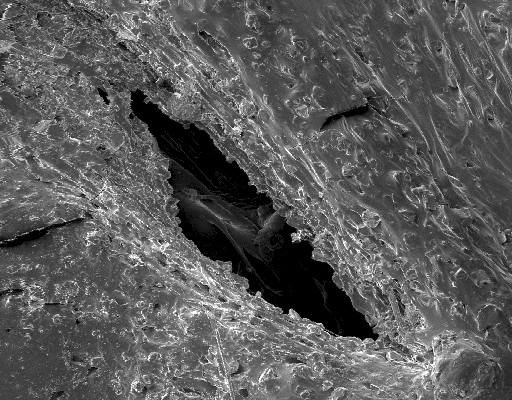
Blu Tack under a scanning electron microscope

Blu Tack is described as a synthetic rubber compound without hazardous properties under normal conditions. It can be swallowed without harm and is not carcinogenic. It is non-soluble and is denser than water. The material is not flammable, but emits carbon dioxide and carbon monoxide when exposed to fire or high temperatures.

== Similar products ==
Similar products of various colours are made by many manufacturers, including Faber-Castell's "Tack-it", Henkel's "Fun-Tak", UHU's "Poster Putty" and "Sticky Tack", UFO's "Dough Tack", "Gummy Sticker" Pritt's "Sticky Stuff", and Elmer's "Poster Tack". Plasti-Tak by Brooks Manufacturing Company appears to pre-date Blu Tack, with a trademark registration in 1964.

Versions of the product are also sold under the generic names "adhesive putty" and "mounting putty". The generic trademark or common name for mounting putty varies by region. It is known as "Patafix" in France, Italy, Portugal, Austria and Turkey, kennaratyggjó in Iceland and lærertyggis in Norway (both meaning "teacher's chewing gum"), häftmassa ("attachment paste") or kludd in Sweden, and wondergom in South Africa (an Afrikaans word, literally translated as "wonder glue").

== Alternative uses ==
Like all poster putties, Blu Tack can work as an alternative to a traditional kneaded eraser.

Blu Tack was often used with the Sinclair ZX81 microcomputer to help mitigate crashes caused by wobbly external RAM modules. This was such a widespread problem that Sinclair Research's technical support department officially recommended the use of Blu Tack to resolve this issue.

In 2007 the artist Elizabeth Thompson created a 200 kg (440 lb) sculpture of a house spider using Blu Tack over a wire frame. It was exhibited at London Zoo.

Blu Tack can be used as a damping agent for sound and vibration applications, due to its low amplitude response properties. A 2013 study concluded that the substance is a comfortable alternative to over-the-counter ear plugs for the attenuation of everyday sound.

The New Zealand Government Earthquake Commission recommends that products such as Blu Tack should be used to prevent ornaments and small household items from falling or moving in the event of an earthquake.

Blu Tack is sometimes used by electronic hobbyists to hold through-hole electronic components in position for soldering onto PC-boards.
