= Strange Meeting (novel) =

1971 novel by Susan Hill

- First edition
- Author: Susan Hill
- Language: English
- Genre: War literature
- Publisher: Hamish Hamilton
- Publication date: 18 Oct 1971
- Publication place: United Kingdom
- Pages: 224
- ISBN: 0-241-02069-7

Strange Meeting is a novel by Susan Hill about the First World War. The title of the book is taken from a poem by the First World War poet Wilfred Owen. The novel was first published by Hamish Hamilton in 1971 and then by Penguin Books in 1974.

== Characters ==
=== Main characters ===
- John George Glover Hilliard – The protagonist of the novel, John Hillard is a withdrawn character who begins the novel in a military hospital, recovering from a wound to the leg. He feels that his family have no understanding of the conflict and is relieved when he is able to return to France.
- David Barton – The second main character in the novel is David Barton. A direct contrast to the character of a Hilliard, he is a friendly man who is able to charm almost everyone he meets. Unlike John he has only recently arrived and is not aware of the realities of war. At the end of the novel Barton goes missing in action, presumed dead.

=== Minor characters ===
- Constance Hilliard – John Hilliard's mother.
- Captain Franklin – An Adjutant. John argues with David that Franklin "has it in for us". Franklin is an unemotional character described in one of Barton's diaries as "someone with a head to lose but a heart? I wonder."
- Coulter – A soldier and familiar face to Hilliard. Coulter is the new batman who replaces Bates, who has been killed. Coulter dies in a raid on the German trenches at the end of the book.
- Harris – A shell-shocked soldier who hides in the corner of a cellar; he is killed by a shell blast.
- Colonel Garrett – David and John's commanding officer. He criticises the senior officers and describes the state of his battalion as "absolute bloody chaos". When Hilliard goes to see him he has yellow fingers and whisky by his side, suggesting that he has been drinking to cope with the stresses of war.
- Beth Hilliard (Mrs. Henry Partington) – John Hilliard's sister. She tells John that she may marry Henry Partington.
- Henry Partington – The lawyer that Beth marries.
- Crawford – A doctor in the military hospital where Hilliard recovers from his wounds, and was Hilliard's dance partner when they were young.

== Plot summary ==
=== Part I ===
The novel begins with the protagonist of the novel, John Hilliard, in a military hospital, recovering from a wound he received; he briefly speaks to Crawford, a doctor, whom he knows from childhood and greatly dislikes. It is when Hilliard returns home that he has trouble sleeping. This is not because of his memories of war, but from being at home, a place which he greatly dislikes.

The opening pages of the novel concern his brief period of sick leave back in England where his sister Beth, mother Constance and father are blind to the horror of the trenches. John finds it hard to adapt to life back in England and is happy to return to the war; especially after the new distance between him and his sister, to whom he was previously close. When Hilliard returns he finds that his batman and many other faces he knew have been killed. The group's Commanding Officer, Colonel Garrett, appears to have aged greatly in the short time Hilliard has been away, due to the stresses of war, and has taken to drinking quantities of whisky.

His old batman is replaced with a new one called Coulter and he is placed in a room with a new Officer called David Barton in a rest camp while they wait to be called up to the front. During this time he becomes great friends with Barton, who is as yet untouched by the war. Throughout this chapter, the new Adjutant, a character called Franklin, appears expressionless and remote from the group.

The chapter ends with Hilliard and Barton witnessing the wreckage of a German plane crash which shocks Barton, who has not seen a dead body yet.

=== Part II ===
In Part Two, the group that Hilliard and Barton are in, B Company, is travelling to the front line at Feuvry. There are not enough horses so David walks alongside for the duration of the journey. He writes a letter home describing what a terrible place Feuvry is; the town has few buildings left intact after being shelled and occupied by the Germans in 1914.

When they arrive at their billets the Officers are informed that a soldier called Harris won't come out of the cellar. Harris is a new recruit who has broken down in terror; Barton manages to talk him round and lead him from the cellar. While Barton goes to fetch some rum ration for the still unstable Harris, a shell falls on the billets, killing Harris. Barton blames himself for the soldier's death because he would have been safe if Barton had not talked him out of the cellar.

In another letter home Barton confesses that he has become hardened by his experiences in the war. He also states that John thinks that one of the most difficult experiences is getting used to the new faces as so many soldiers die.

The chapter ends with Barton being chosen to go to the front lines to draw a map of the surrounding area with a runner called Grosse. In the front line he witnesses a shelling and the deaths of several men; he also sees a Private killed by a German sniper. After returning from the front line Barton admits that he feels that the war is changing him because he is unable to feel emotion for every soldier killed due to the sheer numbers killed each day.

=== Part III ===
The final chapter of the novel begins with one of Barton's long letters complaining that "we are drones not fighting men". He is concerned that his letter may be censored by the military but he wants to tell those back home the truth.

John gets a letter stating that his sister Beth is to marry the lawyer Henry Partington which causes John to become angry at those back home. Hilliard and Barton are sent on a reconnaissance mission which requires the men to spy on the enemy trenches. They can see little and after a flare exposes their position they are forced to retreat with some casualties. Barton feels guilty that he left Coulter, the batman, to die in No Man's Land.

In another letter home, Barton states that the constant death erodes his courage. Midway through the letter, the C.O. states that he is leaving the platoon after arguing with Generals that reconnaissance missions are a waste of lives.

After this news, a Private called Parkin is worried about the news that they will soon be going over the top. Barton and Hilliard begin to talk about how they will meet after the war before they realise they are assuming that they both will survive.

During the military advance, Barton and Hilliard lose track of each other's positions. Hilliard is injured by a shell and is forced to hide in a hole by several dead bodies. At nightfall he crawls back to his trench. His leg is amputated in France and at first he is too ill to return to England. The inconclusive end of the novel is Hilliard being informed by a letter from Barton's parents that Barton is missing and presumed dead. Hilliard writes to inform Barton's parents that it is extremely unlikely that Barton is alive. Once he gets back to England, he goes and visits Barton's family and friends, and feels he knows the place already from Barton's descriptions.

== Afterword ==
- In the afterword to the novel Susan Hill explains that she did not intend "the conclusion to be drawn" that the relationship between Barton and Hilliard is a physical one, though this interpretation "would not greatly alter" how their interactions play out. She also writes that she hoped the novel would be seen as a novel as much on the subject of human love as 'war and the pity of war'.
- In the afterword she goes on to state that a performance of Benjamin Britten's War Requiem made her want to write about the First World War: "But I was not at all prepared for the effect that performance War Requiem was to have on me. I came out feeling dazed, as though something very important had happened ...I cant exactly explain it or even describe it. But one result was that I became filled with the desire to write something myself about the First World War.

== See also ==
- List of works by Susan Hill
