= Mrs de Winter =

Novel by Susan Hill

- First edition
- Author: Susan Hill
- Language: English
- Publisher: Sinclair-Stevenson
- Publication date: 4 Oct 1993
- Publication place: United Kingdom
- Pages: 384
- ISBN: 1-85619-330-6

Mrs de Winter is a novel by Susan Hill published in 1993. It is a sequel to the novel Rebecca by Daphne du Maurier.

== Summary ==
Maxim de Winter and his second wife have returned to England, only to face the terrible possibility that Rebecca is haunting their lives once more.

== Reviews ==
Critical reviews were generally negative, with many describing that the novel could not match up to the original. The plot has also been regarded as quite dull, without any evolution of the character of Mrs de Winter in spite of the time lapse. In addition, it casts the same characters all over again without the narration being intense and engaging enough. "Throughout the media jamboree attending this sequel, Rebecca's remaining lovers will feel like Mrs Danvers – dour, uncomprehending, and dismissive of the newcomer's ineffective attempts to please".
