= Letters Live =

Staged reading event

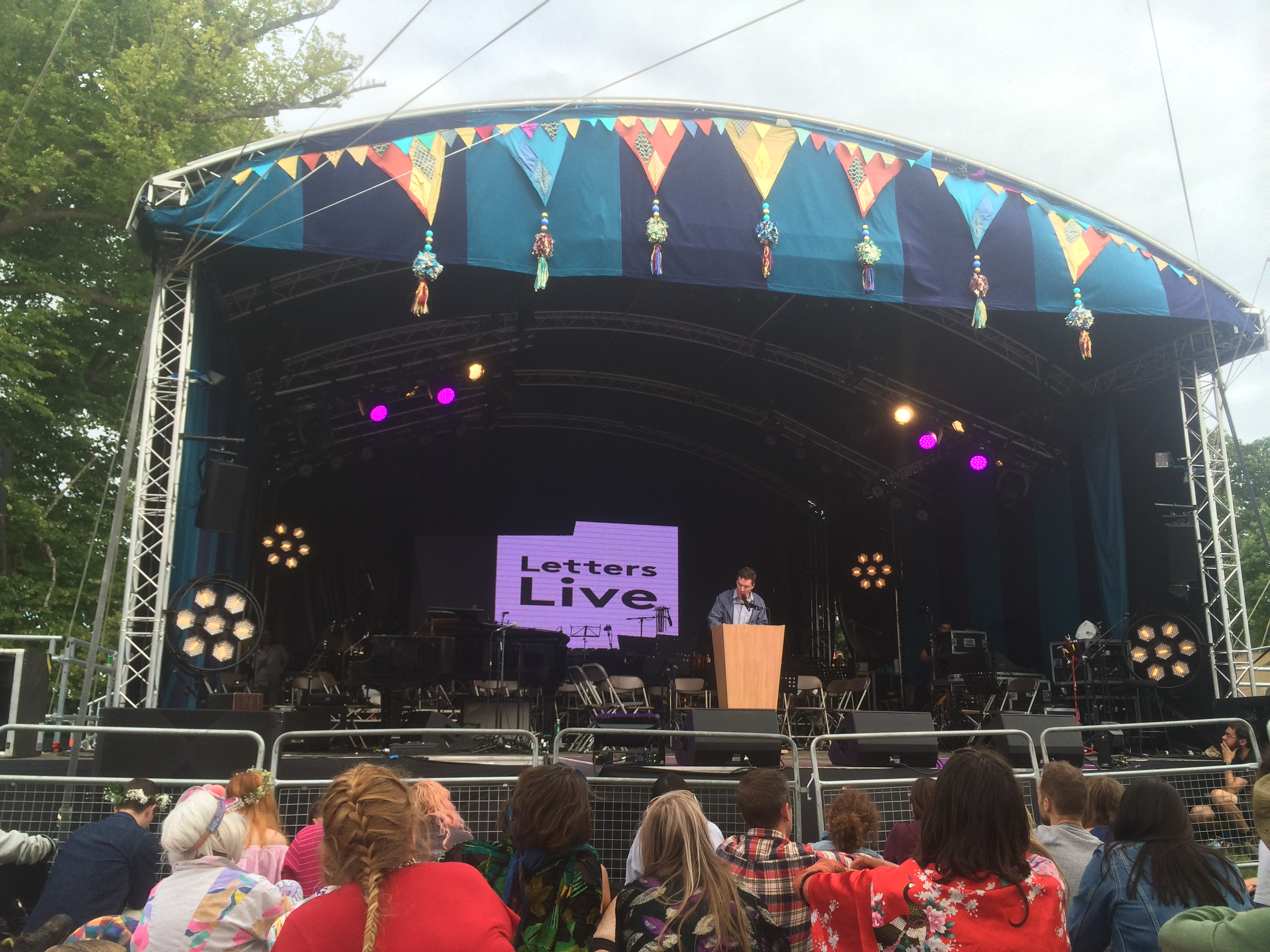
Benedict Cumberbatch performing in 2017 at a Letters Live event at the Wilderness Festival.

Letters Live is a staged reading show of literary correspondence created and developed in 2013 by independent publishing house Canongate Books in partnership with production company SunnyMarch. During the shows, actors read interesting, funny, or dramatic letters to the audience.

Letters Live events have taken place in a wide range of venues and locations since its inception. While these events have primarily taken place in the United Kingdom, it has also been performed in other countries, including the United States.

== Beginnings ==
Letters Live initially started as a one-off literacy charity event to promote Canongate Books epistolary texts Letters of Note by Shaun Usher and To the Letter by Simon Garfield in December 2013. Usher had been compiling letters in an online blog, searching for interesting, funny, or dramatic letters in libraries, museums, and archives. Jamie Byng of Canongate Books contacted celebrities he knew to get them involved in the event. Initially intended to be a one-off, the event received very positive feedback from attendees, and Byng decided to host more.

== Format ==
Letters Live takes the format of a series of readings of letters, typically performed by famous actors. Some actors have a preference for letters they would like to read. The letters are sometimes accompanied by music. Performers are generally onstage alone, at a lectern, and are usually not known to the audience in advance.

The letters read during events are selected from those catalogued in Usher's book and blog, and have included correspondences including Virginia Woolf's suicide note and a letter sent by Mahatma Gandhi to Adolf Hitler in 1939.

== Events ==
The first event, in 2013, included performers Benedict Cumberbatch, Gillian Anderson, and Neil Gaiman. The event, in addition to promoting the two Canongate Books publications, raised money for UK charity The Reading Agency.

Letters Live has also been hosted at the Hay Festival.

In 2016, a Letters Live event took place in the Calais Jungle, where actors including Jude Law and Matt Berry read letters written by refugees.

During the COVID-19 lockdown in the United Kingdom, a digital event was broadcast from the Roundhouse theatre.

Other performers have included Oscar Isaac, Russell Brand, Ian McKellen, Caitlin Moran, Tom Hiddleston, and Carey Mulligan. At a 2019 event at the Royal Albert Hall, Rory Stewart read a critical letter by Boris Johnson's former Eton housemaster to announce his resignation from the Conservative Party of the United Kingdom.

A U.S. version of Letters Live debuted in 2015 in Los Angeles. Performers included Julia Louis-Dreyfus and J. J. Abrams, and the event was hosted by Jimmy Kimmel. Another Los Angeles show was performed in 2018.

== Reception ==
In reviews published in 2016, both The Daily Telegraph and The Independent gave Letters Live 4/5 stars. In The Independent's review, they described the show as "carefully constructed", with the right mix of different kinds of letters being read. The Daily Telegraph gave a 2022 show 3/5 stars.
