= The Albatross (novella) =

Book by Susan Hill

- First edition (collection)
- Author: Susan Hill
- Language: English
- Genre: Social realism
- Publisher: Hamish Hamilton (collection); Penguin Books (standalone)
- Publication date: Feb 1971 / Nov 2000
- Publication place: United Kingdom
- Media type: Print & audio
- Pages: 192 / 96
- Awards: John Llewellyn Rhys Prize
- ISBN: 0-241-01976-1 (collection); ISBN 0-14-029330-2 (standalone)

The Albatross is a novella written by Susan Hill, first appearing in the collection The Albatross and Other Stories published by Hamish Hamilton in 1971. It won the John Llewellyn Rhys Prize in 1972. It appeared as a standalone book published by Penguin Books in 2000. It is studied in GCSE English as an example of the best of modern women's writing.

== Plot introduction ==
The Albatross centers around Duncan, an intellectually disabled 18-year-old who has grown up with his domineering wheelchair-using mother in Heype, a Suffolk seaside town based on Aldeburgh. Duncan finds it difficult to cope with anything outside his daily routine but is forced to interact with the wider world when his claustrophobic relationship with his mother reaches a breaking point.

== Inspiration ==
The story was partly inspired by local composer Benjamin Britten's opera Peter Grimes.

== Publication history ==
- 1971, UK, Hamish Hamilton, ISBN 0-241-01976-1, Pub date 11 Feb 1971, Hardback
- 1973, UK, Penguin, ISBN 0-14-003649-0, Pub date 25 Oct 1973, Paperback
- 1975, US, E.P. Dutton, ISBN 0-8415-0383-4, Hardback
- 1978, UK, Hamish Hamilton, ISBN 0-241-10090-9, Pub date Dec 1978, Hardback
- 1994, UK, Soundings, ISBN 1-854-96951-X, Audio cassette, Read by Patricia Gallimore
- 1995, UK, Isis, ISBN 1-85695-383-1, Pub date Jun 1995, Large print
- 2000, UK, Penguin, ISBN 0-14-029330-2, Pub date 30 Nov 2000, Paperback

== See also ==
- List of works by Susan Hill
