= From the Heart (novel) =

2017 novel by Susan Hill

- First edition
- Author: Susan Hill
- Cover artist: "Keys", printed hair cloth, 1954 by Ruth Adler Schnee
- Language: English
- Publisher: Chatto and Windus
- Publication date: 2 March 2017
- Publication place: United Kingdom
- Media type: Print
- Pages: 224
- ISBN: 1-78474-164-7

From the Heart, is a coming of age - and coming out novel by Susan Hill, published in March 2017 by Chatto and Windus.

== Plot introduction ==
Set in mid 1950s England the novel follows Olive Piper as she leaves school and attends Bedford College, London to study English Literature. The Drama Society puts a production of Dr Faustus where she meets Malcolm Crowley who is studying Dentistry at King's College London. Not being married, nor able to prove she was going to be married, she was unable to obtain contraception and falls pregnant. She is forced to give up her course and rejecting marriage she moves to a home for unmarried mothers where she gives up her baby for adoption. Unable to return to Bedford College she resumes her studies at Keele. Her first teaching job is at a girls school in Salisbury where she falls in love with an older teacher, Thea...

== Reception ==
Reviews were mixed:

Kirsty McLuckie in The Scotsman comments on the gentleness with which Olive’s choices are handled, "here even Olive’s more traumatic experiences – the death of her parents, the sudden end of a deeply felt love affair – are portrayed as merely a part of life. Olive’s reaction to them is of her time. Stoic, she deals with inner turmoil with a measured control which is reflected in Hill’s pared back writing. The descriptions of her intense feelings, when they come, are therefore all the more powerful." Malcolm Forbes in The Herald is also full of praise for Hill, "So well drawn is her heroine, and so keenly realized her predicaments and misfortunes, that we feel for her at every turn. With trademark crisp, poised prose, Hill expertly articulates Olives, panic, fear and pain.

In contrast Julie Myerson writing in The Guardian is unimpressed, "The prose is clompingly euphemistic, chattily cliche-ridden and bafflingly – for a writer who has given us so many satisfyingly subtle ghost stories – lacking in any attempt at subtext or ambiguity...The result is that the protagonist, for all her supposed truth and tact, never once springs to life, while peripheral characters – fumbling, dry-lipped boyfriend, sternly patronising male doctor – seem to have arrived straight from central casting." Melissa Katsoulis of The Times writes "the brief section where Olive experiences that tragedy in the punishing confines of a home for unmarried mothers is unbearably sad and will make parents feel sick. Fortunately for any fainthearted readers, this is the only stirring part of an otherwise bland narrative."
