= The Bird of Night =

1972 novel by Susan Hill

- First edition
- Author: Susan Hill
- Language: English
- Published: 1972 Hamish Hamilton (UK); 1973 Saturday Review Press (US)
- Publication place: United Kingdom
- Pages: 186
- ISBN: 0-241-02258-4

The Bird of Night is a 1972 novel by Susan Hill.

In 1972, the book won the Whitbread Award, and was shortlisted for the Booker Prize.

Susan Hill commented in 2006, "A novel of mine was shortlisted for Booker and won the Whitbread Prize for Fiction. It was a book I have never rated. I don't think it works, though there are a few good things in it. I don't believe in the characters or the story."

== Plot introduction ==
Francis Croft was a great poet but suffered from bouts of madness. His companion Harvey Lawson tried to protect him for 20 years, together they spent time in Venice and then Francis travelled to America. On his return his condition worsened leading to his suicide. Harvey then burnt all his papers to shut out an inquisitive world.

== Reception ==
Star-News is positive "The intriguing saga of Francis and his journey through life, and madness, is a story worthy of the finest storyteller. The emphasis on finest detail and the close relation between a character's mental condition and physical age provide an engrossing chronicle...A part of the reason for the ability of Hill to convey the madness theme is the presence of a second character, Harvey Lawson. The agony of Francis is shared and depicted in the memory and writing of Lawson.

== See also ==
- Gothic Transformations and Musical Appropriations
