= The Service of Clouds =

1998 novel by Susan Hill

- First edition
- Author: Susan Hill
- Language: English
- Publisher: Chatto & Windus
- Publication date: 5 Nov 1998
- Publication place: United Kingdom
- Media type: Print
- Pages: 288
- ISBN: 1-856-19279-2

The Service of Clouds, is a novel by the English author Susan Hill, first published in 1998 by Chatto & Windus. It takes it title from a passage in John Ruskin describing the supremacy of cloud in modern landscape painting.

== Inspiration ==
Susan Hill writes that "it wasn't triggered by an obsession or a childhood memory. It just grew quietly in my head" However, when pressed, she reveals some of the plot: "It's a story of growing up, of learning to fit in, of breaking away from home. It concerns obsessive parental love - and its opposite. The central character is a woman who lives through and for her son's life."

== Plot introduction ==
The narrative is split between the stories of Flora and her son Molloy but the narratives do not overlap. Flora has contends with the death of her own father, the difficult relationship with her mother May, and then birth of her sister Olga who her mother May dotes on. Flora becomes independent of her family and becomes the governess for Hugh, a six-year-old boy who is then killed in a car accident. Flora's life is accompanied by a series of bereavements and disappointments. Her son also mirrors her experiences of death as he becomes a doctor. The greatest regret is that he was unable to be there at the death of his mother Flora. His wife Elizabeth is also beset by illness which he is determined to ameliorate...

== Reception ==
- The Times writes that the novel 'contains echoes of Virginia Woolf's To The Lighthouse...Hill is rare among contemporary writers...a meticulous down-to-earth and strangely beautiful novel'.
- Carol Birch in The Independent says that 'Susan Hill writes piercingly about grief and its aftermath...The Service of Clouds is skilfully structured, seamlessly blending past and present...Hill's lean, sharp prose and consistently detached tone create a severe and rather beautiful book, with a certain plain poetry that flows silkily off the page. What little conversation there is, is stylised, repetitive and curiously formal.'
- Lisa Allardice from The Observer praises the novel: 'Death is everywhere in this gentle, atmospheric novel...Hill's detached yet charged prose is in keeping with her reserved, inwardly intense characters. An unsettling amorphousness shrouds events for which time and place are mistily unspecified. The Service of Clouds is typically gloomy, but as accomplished and moving as Hill's previous work.'
- Anita Brookner, writing in The Spectator is rather negative: 'The thread running through the story is one of almost willed decline...it is treated here as if no other choices had been offered...the tone very slightly suffocating as cloudy as the title suggests' and concludes that 'The dispiriting message is that failure leads to over-compensation. No heroine deserves such a fate.'
