= A Change for the Better =

1969 novel by Susan Hill

- First edition
- Author: Susan Hill
- Language: English
- Publisher: Hamish Hamilton
- Publication date: 1969
- Publication place: United Kingdom
- Pages: 223
- ISBN: 0-241-01772-6

A Change for the Better is a 1969 novel by English writer Susan Hill, published by Hamish Hamilton.

== Plot ==
The novel is set one November in a seaside town where Deirdrie Fount and her mother Winifred Oddicott run a drapery shop. Deirdre's 11-year-old son James never knew his father as they divorced shortly after his birth, but he often wonders about his father.

Also in the town are Major Bertram Carpenter and his wife Flora who are residents in a large plush hotel. Bertram met his elderly friend Mr Isepp every couple of days but when the Carpenters return from a cruise from the West Indies he finds that his friend is ill. Bertram visits him at the hospital where Mr Isepp dies - Bertram is shocked by his friends death, aware of his own mortality and also blames the doctors...

Meanwhile, Aubrey Fount, James' father is staying at the hotel where he plans to meet Deirdre and to introduce himself to his son James.
