= Black Sheep (Hill novel) =

2013 novella by Susan Hill

- First edition
- Author: Susan Hill
- Cover artist: Mary Evans Picture Library
- Language: English
- Publisher: Chatto & Windus
- Publication date: 24 October 2013
- Publication place: United Kingdom
- Media type: Print
- Pages: 144
- ISBN: 0-7011-8421-3

Black Sheep, is a novella by the English author Susan Hill, published in 2013 by Chatto & Windus.

== Plot introduction ==
The story is set in a bleak coal-mining village and centres around brother and sister Ted and Rose Howker. It follows their growth from childhood into adulthood and their attempts to break free from the drudgery of their existence, Ted through heading out of the valley to work on a sheep-farm, and Rose through marriage to the pit-manager's son. Neither is able to truly escape and their choices lead to tragedy.

== Inspiration ==
In an interview with The Guardian, Hill revealed that the book was inspired by "a black and white photograph of a 19th-century engraving she found online". The village was, she said, "...exactly as I describe. It was essentially an amphitheatre with all the mine workings in the bottom with the great gantry thing, and terraces of houses going up, and a little path with a gate through which people went down to work, and you could just see at the top where the houses petered out, farmland, country. You couldn't think of a more closed community than this bowl."

== Reception ==
M. J. Hyland, writing in The Guardian, commented on Hill's reserved style. "Every scene turns on the stories of the stricken lives of the Howker family, their neighbours and friends, all of whom endure unending 'punishments': cancer, domestic abuse, a missing child, an explosion in the coalmine and murder. In spite of the darkness of the subject matter, the storytelling voice is coy and restrained, and the language is simple, almost childlike, as though Hill means to soften the ceaseless blows... This is not a complex work of fiction. Hill may not astonish, or deal in clever invention, but she does what all good writers must set out to do: she made me read until I had the answer."

Simon Baker in The Spectator was generally positive. "This is an admirably compressed book, in which the snappy pacing sits in enjoyable contrast to the slow plod of village life. Moments of importance are described with a brevity that generally serves to sharpen rather than deaden them. A lot is crammed into these short, generously spaced pages, and only occasionally does Hill’s economy create a slub in the texture — when, for example, the conciseness reduces to summary, or when a physical feature (ugliness or muscularity, say) serves as a surrogate for fuller characterisation. In the main, however, Black Sheep is gripping all the way to its unexpected end."

Allan Massie, in The Scotsman, was full of praise, concluding, "This is a story of people living hard lives, narrow lives which nevertheless have their own dignity. It is beautifully, even lovingly, told, with not a superfluous word, and it ends in tragedy. You can read it in a couple of hours, but what you read is likely to stay longer with you than many books which seem more obviously ambitious. Characters are sketched in a couple of sentences, and fixed in your imagination. Manner is perfectly matched with matter; it’s impossible to suppose that the story could be better told."
