= Gentleman and Ladies =

1968 novel by Susan Hill

- First edition
- Author: Susan Hill
- Language: English
- Publisher: Hamish Hamilton (UK); Walker & Co. (US)
- Publication date: 1968
- Publication place: United Kingdom

Gentleman and Ladies is a novel by English author Susan Hill, published in 1968, runner-up for the John Llewellyn Rhys Prize. It is notable in exploring themes of death, mental health, and elderly well-being, despite Hill's relative youth at the time of writing.

== Plot reception ==
The story begins at a funeral in the village of Haverstock and ends at a wedding. A stranger appears at the funeral of Faith Lavender, holding stolen bluebells. Faith's two sisters and neighbours are perplexed by the man, and soon 'undercurrents of fierce emotion, that until now have been suppressed, reach the surface while the tensions rise'.

== Reception ==
In The New York Times, Hill's style is "Briskly impressionistic is better than its substance. Bits and pieces of life among these English senior citizens are sharply illuminated, but the book as a whole has the texture of a soap opera".

== Adaptation ==
BBC Radio 4 produced an adaptation of a radio play in January 1993 featuring Patricia Hayes, Stephanie Cole, Sian Phillips, Gwen Watford and Anna Cropper.
