= The Beacon (novel) =

2008 novel by Susan Hill

- First edition
- Author: Susan Hill
- Cover artist: Getty Images
- Language: English
- Publisher: Chatto and Windus
- Publication date: 2 Oct 2008
- Publication place: United Kingdom
- Media type: Print & ebook
- Pages: 160
- ISBN: 0-7011-8340-3

The Beacon, is a novel by English author Susan Hill, first published in 2008 by Chatto and Windus and in paperback the following year by Vintage Books.

== Plot introduction ==
The four Prime children grow up in a bleak North Country farmhouse called 'The Beacon'; Colin and Berenice marry locally, May, the central character of the novel went to university in London but returns within a year. Only quiet, watchful Frank escapes to become a journalist on Fleet Street. But then he publishes a successful novel about his childhood which throws the family into turmoil...

== Reception ==
- Joanna Briscoe in The Guardian described it as a "novel of great structural and stylistic control" and as being "an almost perfect little literary novel outside any genre. A cross-generational family story barely longer than a novella, it possesses the light tug of menace and almost invisible haze of tension that characterise Hill's ghost stories, yet there is nothing supernatural about this tale of a farming family grounded in the seasons. The slippery nature of memory is what casts an atmosphere of unease over the novel".
- Laura Thompson in The Telegraph writes "this short book is richly satisfying. Hill's craftsmanship is masterly. We are always aware of the farming backdrop: the book begins with a superb evocation of rural hardship, whose inexorable rhythms read like pared-down Thomas Hardy." and goes on to describe it as "a little masterpiece".
- The Times said it was "a moving, evocative and rewarding novel".

== Radio Dramatisation ==
The novel was dramatised for BBC Radio 4's Woman's Hour Drama, broadcast in five 15-minute episodes from March 22–26, 2010.
