= The Pure in Heart =

2005 novel by Susan Hill

- First edition
- Author: Susan Hill
- Language: English
- Series: Simon Serrailler
- Publisher: Chatto & Windus
- Publication date: 2 Jun 2005
- Publication place: United Kingdom
- ISBN: 0-7011-7681-4
- Preceded by: The Various Haunts of Men
- Followed by: The Risk of Darkness

The Pure in Heart is a novel by Susan Hill. It is the second in a series of seven crime novels which contains The Various Haunts of Men and The Risk of Darkness.
