= The Various Haunts of Men =

2004 novel by Susan Hill

- First edition
- Author: Susan Hill
- Language: English
- Series: Simon Serrailler
- Publisher: Chatto & Windus
- Publication date: 3 Jun 2004
- Publication place: United Kingdom
- Pages: 448
- ISBN: 0-7011-7741-1
- Followed by: The Pure in Heart

The Various Haunts of Men (2004) is a novel by Susan Hill. It is the first in a series of seven "Simon Serrailler" crime novels by the author. It concerns the disappearance of people in the English cathedral town of Lafferton and the resulting police investigations.

== Title ==
The title is taken from George Crabbe's poem The Borough :

The various haunts of men
Require the pencil, they defy the pen

== Characters ==
- Angela Randall was a reclusive unmarried 53-year-old woman who disappears one foggy morning whilst out jogging on The Hill, a local landmark. Her employer at a nursing home, Carol Ashton, insists the police take her disappearance seriously.
- Dr Cat Deerborn, GP in Lafferton, married to Chris, also a doctor
- Debbie Parker, 20-years-old she suffered from depression, acne and was overweight. But after visiting Dava, a spiritual healer she was beginning to feel better and had taken to early-morning walks on The Hill, from one of which she too disappears.
- Freya Graffham A Detective Sergeant new to Lafferton after transferring from the Met is put in charge of the investigation. She discovers that Angela Randall has been buying expensive gifts for an unknown man.
- Simon Serrailler, Detective Chief Inspector is her commanding officer and brother of Cat Deerborn
- Iris Chater a recently bereaved elderly lady seeking comfort in spiritualist meetings is the next to disappear

== Reception ==
Reviews have been mixed :

- Anita Brookner of The Spectator is positive: "There is plenty to enjoy. And the ending is terrific."
- Robert Edric writing in The Guardian found the novel disappointing "We neither know nor sympathise with the victims in this book; nor are we repelled or intrigued by the killer and his reason for committing these murders. His justification, when it is finally delivered, is both simplistic and unconvincing."
- Andrew Taylor in The Independent writes "She has the priceless ability to construct a solidly-researched narrative that keeps the reader turning the pages." but then goes on to say "The identity of the murderer is allowed to drift into the story three-quarters of the way through. Neither the reader nor police have much to do with it. The killer's motivation is so perfunctorily sketched that it fails to convince. The ending is arbitrary, unsatisfying and suspiciously convenient."
