= Dolly: A Ghost Story =

2012 novella by Susan Hill

Dolly:A Ghost Story
- First edition
- Author: Susan Hill
- Language: English
- Publisher: Profile Books
- Publication date: October 5th 2012
- Publication place: United Kingdom
- Media type: Print
- Pages: 153
- ISBN: 1-84668-574-5

Dolly: A Ghost Story, is a novella, published in October 2012 by Profile Books.

== Plot introduction ==
The story is principally set in the decaying Iyot House, in the damp and lonely Fens of Eastern England where orphan Edward Cayley is sent to spend the summer with his dour Aunt Kestrel and his spoilt cousin Leonora. For Leonora's birthday she believes she will receive a beautiful Indian doll of royal bride; but when she opens her present she flies into a terrible rage, the ramifications of which haunt herself and Edward for years to come.

== Reception ==
Rebecca Armstrong writing in The Independent is generally positive "In a book as short as this, what's left out is as important as what's left in. There's a sense of each character's life beyond the page which reveals Hill's immense skill. She's very good on horrid shocks that stay in the mind and, while I'd be lying if I said I was totally convinced by the logic of the denouement, I relished the nastiness therein. Moments were reminiscent of Wilde's The Picture of Dorian Gray, and a short section set in an Eastern European town was pure M R James. That's not to say Dolly is derivative; just that it has the hallmarks of good, scary storytelling."

Sadie Jones in The Guardian contrasts the work with Henry James, writing, "While parallels with The Turn of the Screw might be assumed, it is not the psychology of the perception of evil that is considered in Dolly but evil itself. The narrative is conventional but an examination of love and the lack of it is the substance of the book. Is evil caused by psychological damage, or is it inherent?" and concludes "An assuredly chilling ghost story, Dolly doesn't leave its questions unanswered. Damage is assumed, noted, but not forgiven, and as the story develops evil is passed through the generations like a stain – in dark places, dank graves, dolls, and ultimately even human flesh."

Publishers Weekly calls Dolly a future classic of the genre: "Hill’s unemotional style envelopes the uncanny in prosaic realism, and her suggestive approach achieves superb uneasiness. Unresolved moral complexities bedevil victims in an unjust universe where decency is no protection from evil."
