= The Man in the Picture =

2007 novel written by Susan Hill

- First edition (UK)
- Author: Susan Hill
- Language: English
- Publisher: Profile Books (UK); Overlook Press (US)
- Publication date: 2007 (UK), 2008 (US)
- Publication place: United Kingdom
- Media type: Print & ebook
- Pages: 160
- ISBN: 1-84668-075-1

The Man in the Picture: A Ghost Story, is a novel by English author Susan Hill, first published in 2007 by Profile Books. It has been featured as BBC Radio 4's Book at Bedtime.

== Plot ==
An oil painting of masked revellers at a Venetian carnival hangs in the room of Oliver's old professor in Cambridge, its story is revealed to Oliver one cold winter's night by the ageing don, the picture having the power to entrap and destroy those who cross its path.
