= The Small Hand =

2010 novel by Susan Hill

- First edition cover
- Author: Susan Hill
- Language: English
- Genre: Fiction
- Publisher: Profile Books
- Publication date: 2010
- Publication place: United Kingdom
- Media type: Print & ebook
- Pages: 176
- ISBN: 1-84668-236-3

The Small Hand: A Ghost Story is a novel by English author Susan Hill, first published in 2010 by Profile Books. A television film adaptation, Susan Hill's Ghost Story, was broadcast by Channel 5 in December 2019.

== Plot ==
On returning from a visit to a client, antiquarian book dealer Adam Snow takes a wrong turn and comes across a derelict Edwardian House. Overcome by curiosity he approaches the entrance and feels a small cold hand creeping into his own 'as if a child had taken hold of it'. Over the coming weeks he becomes subject to nightmares and panic attacks and further visits from the small hand. He vows to learn more about the house and its overgrown garden.

== Reception ==
Reviews were mixed :

- Jeremy Dyson writing in The Guardian writes 'this is a wonderful piece of storytelling that does what a good story ought to do: it keeps you guessing, pulls you in. And when the climax comes, the explanation and the source of the haunting are not what you think at all. You really don't see it coming.'
- However Joan Smith writing in The Sunday Times complains 'The Small Hand exists in a version of the modern world that doesn’t quite feel convincing, and Hill has to keep up the eerie atmosphere by reminding the reader that events are tending towards a tragic denouement. By definition ghost stories deal in the unexplained, but this one leaves too little to the imagination.
