= Bostik =

French industrial company

- Formerly: Boston Blacking Company
- Company type: Limited company
- Founded: 1889; 137 years ago
- Headquarters: 51 Esplanade du Géneral de Gaulle, 92800 Puteaux, France
- Area served: Worldwide
- Key people: Vincent Legros (chairman and CEO)
- Products: Adhesives and sealants for construction, durable goods, advanced packaging, disposable hygiene (non-woven) and consumer goods
- Brands: Blu Tack (Prestik), Den Braven, Evo-Stik, Fortaleza, Lip, Mem, Prochimir, Quelyd, Sader, Super Vulcaseal, Xl Brands
- Revenue: €2.7 billion
- Owner: Arkema
- Number of employees: 7,000
- Website: bostik.com

Bostik is a manufacturer and distributor of adhesives and sealants for the construction, industrial and consumer markets. With annual sales of €2.7 billion in 2024, the company employs over 7,000 people and has a presence in more than 45 countries. Bostik is part of the French-based Arkema group.

== History ==
In 1889, the Boston Blacking Company, a producer of leather colourings and dyes, was founded in Chelsea, Massachusetts. The company became the chemical branch of United Shoe Machinery Corporation (USMC) – an American leader in the shoemaking industry – and grew in several countries through mergers, acquisitions and organic growth.

By the late 1920s, the Boston Blacking Company was established in 12 countries across three continents and employed over 1,000 chemists and technicians. A number of products had been launched under the Bostik brand as early as the 1940s and the company took on Bostik as a company name in the 1960s.

In 1980, Bostik was taken over by the Connecticut group Emhart Corporation, which nine years later was, itself, bought up by Black & Decker. Black & Decker split apart the mechanical and chemical activities of the group to leave Bostik as a stand-alone concern.

In 1990, the French oil and gas group Total acquired Bostik and merged its own adhesive affiliates into it.

In 2000, Totalfina and Elf Aquitaine merged to form TotalFinaElf, subsequently renamed Total. Their respective adhesives divisions, Bostik and Atofindley, were brought together to form Bostik Findley, and the name was subsequently changed in 2004 to Bostik.

In 2013 Bostik revisited its brand identity, with a new signature "smart adhesives" and a gecko inspired from nature with a science-based connection to Bostik's adhesives business. In 2015, Arkema, a global chemical major with leadership positions in specialty chemicals and high performance materials, acquired Bostik. In 2019 Bostik won an Adhesives and Sealants Council (ASC) Innovation Award for " "Brilliance" which is an olefin elastic high-performance attachment adhesive."

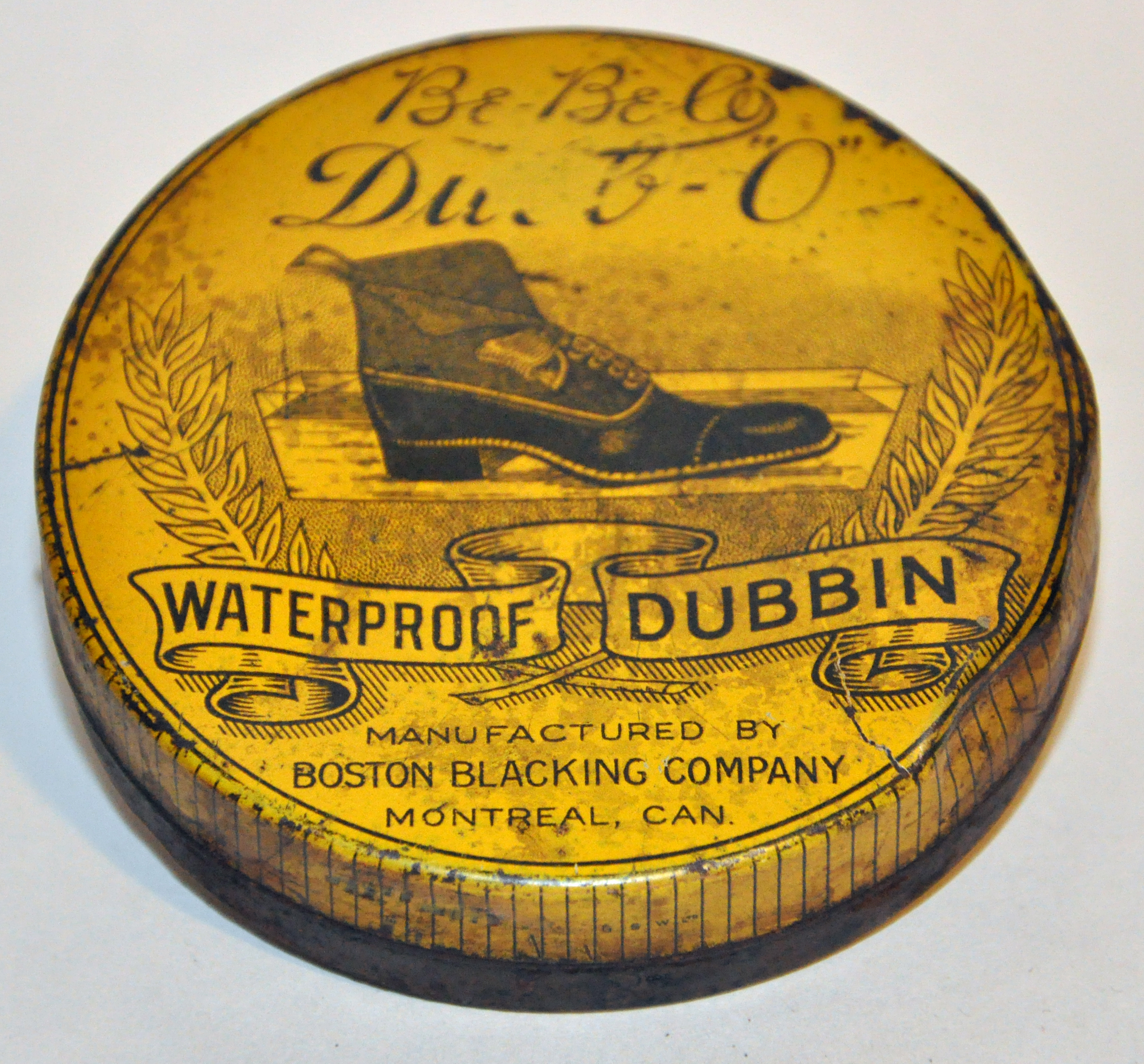
Early 20th century dubbin tin from the Boston Blacking Co. under the Be-Be-Co brand name: Dubb-O

== Headquarters building ==
In 1937, Boston Blacking built a Streamline Moderne headquarters building in Cambridge, Massachusetts, signposted as "B B CHEMICAL", and used it until 1966. The building has been listed on the National Register of Historic Places since 1982.

== Products ==
Bostik is among the four top adhesives and sealants producers in the world. Bostik employs over 5,000 workers in 50 countries and five continents.

Bostik has a well recognized name in industrial markets. It has some divisions such as: Industrial/Nonwovens, Construction and Distribution, and High-performance polymers. Its brands include Bostik, Blu Tack, Prestik, Sader, Quelyd, Simson, Evo-Stik, Alliance, Ardal, Cementone, Mem, Technik, Hey'Di, SB Mercier, Chem-Calk, Hydroment, Durabond, Anchor Weld, Clag, Gripfill, Flexacryl and Aquamac weatherband.

On the industrial level, Bostik products are used in many sectors including aeronautics, household appliances, automotive, transport and construction.

Bostik products are also used in the packaging industry and advanced packaging, as well as in the assembly sector and disposable hygiene products.

Bostik is also for the General Public with preparation, assembly and repair products as well as a range of adhesives and glues, stationery and artisanar for DIY and hobby (including Blu Tack).

== Rewards ==
Two products have received the approval of professionals and the general public:

- Brilliance: the first high-performance olefin adhesive for fixing elastics, a patented formulation. In 2018, Bostik won the Adhesives and Sealant Council (ASC) trophy for the contribution to innovation of Brilliance™.
- Fix & Flash: bonding technology which dries in contact with the rays of LED light. Fix & Flash is voted "Product of the year 2019" in the "repair glue" category.
