= The Travelling Bag and Other Ghostly Stories =

Short story collection by Susan Hill

Travelling Bag And Other Ghostly Stories
- First edition
- Author: Susan Hill
- Language: English
- Publisher: Profile Books
- Publication date: September 29th 2016
- Publication place: United Kingdom
- Media type: Print
- Pages: 183
- ISBN: 1-78125-619-5

The Travelling Bag And Other Ghostly Stories was initially a 2016 collection of four short stories by British author Susan Hill. The 2017 paperback edition included a fifth story, "Printer's Devil Court".

== Stories ==
- The Travelling Bag (Feb 16th 2016 by Long Barn Books) - In a club in St James's a psychic detective recounts a startling case in the actual building. Lady Webb believes that her medical scientist husband's death is more sinister. She brings his long-used travelling bag to the detective who concentrates on it, and finds the truth about the bag and its winged contents.
- Boy Twenty-One - Toby looks back to when he was a boarder at a boys' school 'Hesterley' where he became inseparable from his friend Andreas. But Andreas did not return after the Summer. Then on a day trip to 'Cloten House' he sees Andreas, and an extra boy appears returning on the coach, but only Toby sees him. Toby did not speak for a year and was sent to a special school. Years later Toby discovers that 'Cloten House' has burnt down.
- Alice Baker - The narrator worked in an old office but they were promised that a new office block was being built. Then a new girl, Alice Baker started working with them. Alice kept to herself and worked conscientiously but there was something odd about her. A smell of decay seemed to linger near her. After moving to the new office the atmosphere was stifling and Alice disappeared. The narrator came in early one morning and noticed a young girl roaming round the corridors but she then disappeared. The narrator then went to get some stationary from the basement and saw Alice Baker hanging from the ceiling...
- The Front Room - A young family transforms their front room by a sermon inspired by Isaiah: "bring the homeless poor into your house". They invite Solange to live with them but the Christian mother realises that she needs to protect her children from the evil presence of Solange. After Solange dies her presence reaches from beyond the grave, taking the one thing she wanted.
- Printer's Devil Court (Oct 14th 2013 by Long Barn Books) - A curious manuscript arrives at the step-son of the late Dr Hugh Meredith. Hugh writes of his time in London where he was a trained as a junior doctor. Two of his colleagues, Walter and Rath, consider the raising of Lazarus in the Bible. They believe that they have a procedure of raising the dead to life. Some time later Hugh is invited to a hospital with Walter and Rath where an old man is dying. As the old man expires they succeed in extracting his last breath into a phial, and introduce it to a young woman who is also dying.

== Reception ==
Andrew Michael Hurley in The Guardian writes that Hill "offers four new stories that occupy that place where the humdrum meets the horrific. "The Front Room" sees an act of familial charity end in malicious retribution from beyond the grave. In "Alice Baker", the arrival of a new office worker brings with it a series of strange events that are only explained when building work unearths a tragic incident from the past. "Boy Number Twenty-One" is less assured. It feels more like indecision on the writer's part, as though she is still playing with ideas, and the story reads disappointingly like a first draft, in which voice, plot and structure have yet to be fully realised. In the title story, Hill is on more familiar ground...Anger and jealousy drive Craig to an act of revenge that is reminiscent of the best moments of the macabre in MR James's stories.

Tim Martin writes in The Telegraph that it "is so heavy on the atmosphere that not much chill creeps in around the edges. Even so, "Alice Baker", in which the women of a crumbling office block are haunted by a mysterious temp who lurks in the corner smelling "of rottenness and decay", and "The Front Room", in which a family welcome a malevolent elderly relative into their home, have their authentically unnerving moments."

Kate Saunders in The Times acknowledges that Hill: "produces traditional ghost stories of wonderful elegance" and that she "builds an atmosphere of creepiness in very few words; the pictures she creates in these stories are unforgettable."
