= The Enclosure =

Book by Susan Hill

- First edition
- Author: Susan Hill
- Language: English
- Publisher: Hutchinson
- Publication date: 1961
- Publication place: United Kingdom
- Pages: 192

The Enclosure (1961) is a novel by Susan Hill. Hill wrote the novel when she was 15 years old.
