= All the Knowledge in the World =

2023 history book by Simon Garfield

All the Knowledge in the World: The Extraordinary History of the Encyclopedia
- Author: Simon Garfield
- Subject: Encyclopedia history
- Published: 23 February 2023
- Publisher: William Morrow and Company, Weidenfeld & Nicolson
- ISBN: 978-1-4746-1077-3

All the Knowledge in the World: The Extraordinary History of the Encyclopedia is a 2023 nonfiction book by Simon Garfield, a British journalist and nonfiction author. It covers the history of encyclopedias from Ancient Greece to Wikipedia, with a focus on Encyclopædia Britannica.

== Overview ==
Garfield arranged the twenty-six chapters alphabetically, from "Ahh, Here Comes Andrew Bell", through the alphabet to "Zeitgeist" and "Zywiec", each chapter a few separate vignettes that need not be read in order.

More than 270 years after Denis Diderot stated that the goal of an encyclopedia is "to assemble all the knowledge scattered on the surface of the earth," encyclopedia-inclined people are still working on the task. Garfield argues that encyclopedias have gotten bigger and bigger—more words, entries, volumes, and rival brands of encyclopedias. Because old sets of Encyclopaedia Britannica are worth less than the cost of delivery, Garfield calls them "the fastest depreciating assemblage of information ever known." "What is and isn’t valued knowledge, and how best to present it, has been the recurring headache of every encyclopedia editor in history," he writes.

Garfield’s focus on Britannica, which has operated since 1768, led The New York Times to call it his "de facto protagonist." He notes that the encyclopedia giant paid experts to be sole authors of articles about their topic of study; for example, Sigmund Freud on psychoanalysis, Marie Curie on radium, Alfred Hitchcock on film production. Britannica estimated that it paid $32 million to create its 15th edition, not including printing costs, which is why Garfield calls Britannica "the largest single private investment in publishing history."

He discusses the Yongle Dadian, a massive document with 11,095 manuscript volumes, commissioned by emperor Zhu Di of China’s Ming dynasty.

== Reception ==
The New York Times praised Garfield for portraying the encyclopedia builders of history into interesting characters: "However bookish knowledge can be, Garfield counters this tendency with a light and personable touch." The Wall Street Journal called it a "lively threnody to the encyclopedic impulse."

Joshua Kim of Inside Higher Ed wrote that the narrative of Britannica’s fall into obscurity is missing "the inside story of how Britannica attempted to pivot to the digital age," adding that the Britannica split into two divisions for print and internet, and that in 1999, when Britannica opened its content for free online, its site crashed from the high traffic.

Publishers Weekly praised the book for being "fast-paced and fact-filled."

== See also ==
- Bibliography of Wikipedia
