= Simon Garfield =

British journalist and author

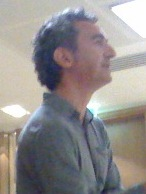
- Garfield in 2009
- Born: 19 March 1960 (age 66); London, United Kingdom
- Occupations: Journalist, author

Simon Frank Garfield (born 19 March 1960) is a British journalist and non-fiction author. He has written for publications such as Time Out, The Independent, and The Observer. His early work focused on the music industry, but his books have increasingly delved into niche topics, from British wrestling and the invention of mauve to the history of encyclopedias and typefaces. Garfield is based in London.

== Career ==
=== Early life and career ===
Simon Frank Garfield was born in London on 19 March 1960 to Herbert Sidney and Hella Helene (née Meyer) Garfield. He grew up in a comfortable middle-class family in Hampstead Garden Suburb. His father was born in Hamburg, Germany, but left for London in 1934, changed his name from Garfunkel to Garfield and became a successful city solicitor. Garfield's father died when Simon was 13, his brother when he was 18 and his mother when he was 19.

Garfield attended University College School. He went on to study at the London School of Economics, where he focused more on writing for The Beaver, the understaffed student newspaper, than his studies, and became joint editor. Garfield later recalled that it was "the best fun you could have apart from student riots," but the staff realized "we'd never have so much journalistic control again". He was awarded Student Journalist of the Year by The Guardian in 1981, which led him to get employed briefly at the Radio Times as subeditor of the BBC Radio 3 listings.

In 1981 and 1982, Garfield worked as a scriptwriter for BBC radio documentaries. He moved on to Time Out, where he served as editor in 1988 and 1989. Garfield often expanded his well-researched articles into books. His first two were on exploitation in the music industry. Money for Nothing: Greed and Exploitation in the Music Industry (1986) was praised by Booklist's Peter L. Robinson as an "insider's account" which had "all the ingredients that produce a juicy public spectacle." Expensive Habits: The Dark Side of the Music Industry (1986) was based on an article Garfield wrote for Time Out about George Michael's legal action against his record label. In his review for The Listener, Dave Rimmer described Garfield as "one of the few writers in Britain dealing regularly, intelligently and entertainingly with the business of music."

=== Further work ===
Garfield was a feature writer for The Independent from 1990 to 1996. He wrote The End of Innocence: Britain in the Time of AIDS (1994) when he found that there was no book on the history of AIDS in the United Kingdom while researching an article about the drug AZT. It won the Somerset Maugham Award. In the London Review of Books, Peter Campbell considered the book to be a successful treatment of its subject which was "objective about difficult issues."

Garfield started writing books on more niche topics: including inside views on British wrestling in The Wrestling (1996) and BBC Radio 1 DJs in The Nation's Favourite: The True Adventures of Radio One (1998); and what The New York Times Book Review called a "straightforward and clear" chronicle of William Henry Perkin's life and legacy in Mauve: How One Man Invented a Colour That Changed the World (2000).

Garfield wrote features for The Observer in 2001 and 2002. He wrote a 2004 piece for the paper, "Unhappy Anniversary", which followed the legacy of tranquillisers such as Valium and led Mind to honour him as Journalist of the Year in 2005. In a three-volume anthology — Our Hidden Lives (2004), We Are at War (2005) and Private Battles (2006) — Garfield edited diaries from the archives of Mass-Observation, established in the 1930s to preserve the daily experiences of "ordinary people". He is now a trustee of the archives.

To cope with a midlife crisis and the breakdown of his first marriage, Garfield wrote a memoir about his personal life and passion for stamp collecting. He rediscovered philately in his 40s, spending thousands of pounds on his collection, but was reluctant to talk about the obsession. Garfield had been married to the playwright Diane Samuels since 1987, with whom he had two sons, but had an affair. Though it did not sell well, writing The Error World: An Affair With Stamps (2008), Garfield told The Guardian's Stuart Jeffries, "enabled me to look back, and it enabled me to grow up a bit." He let go of philately and sold his collection for £42,500, purchasing a place in St Ives, Cornwall.

In 2010 his book Just My Type was published, exploring the history of typographic fonts.

Garfield appeared on 25 February 2013 episode of The Colbert Report to discuss why he wrote On the Map.

Garfield's book To the Letter: A Curious History of Correspondence is one of the inspirations behind the charity event Letters Live.

In 2023, Garfield published a trilogy of books called The ABC of Fonts, featuring the following slim volumes:

- Comic Sans: The Biography of a Typeface
- Albertus: The Biography of a Typeface
- Baskerville: The Biography of a Typeface

In 2026, Canongate published Garfield's The Pen : A Human History, a "lively, idiosyncratic and global history" of the pen.

== Personal life ==
Garfield lives in Hampstead, London, with his wife Justine, a chef. He was previously married to the playwright Diane Samuels.

== Bibliography ==
=== Books ===
- Garfield, Simon (1986). Expensive habits: the dark side of the music industry. London: Faber.
- Money for Nothing: Greed and Exploitation in the Music Industry (1986)
- The End of Innocence: Britain in the Time of AIDS (1994)
- The Wrestling (1996)
- The Nation's Favourite: The True Adventures of Radio One (1998)
- Mauve: How One Man Invented a Color That Changed the World (2000), W. W. Norton & Company, ISBN 0-393-02005-3
- The Last Journey of William Huskisson (2002) – (pioneering development of steam railways in Britain)
- Our Hidden Lives: The Everyday Diaries of a Forgotten Britain (2004) – (interwoven threads from five diaries from post-World War II Britain)
- We are at War: The Remarkable Diaries of Five Ordinary People (2005) – (interwoven accounts from five diaries from the period preceding World War II)
- Private Battles: Our Intimate Diaries – How the War Almost Defeated Us (2006) – (interwoven accounts from four diaries of ordinary Britains living through World War II)
- The Error World: An Affair With Stamps (2008) – (memoir of the author's stamp collecting obsession)
- Exposure: The Unusual Life and Violent Death of Bob Carlos Clarke (2009)
- Mini: The True and Secret History of the Making of a Motor Car (2009)
- Just My Type: A Book About Fonts (Profile Books Ltd, 2010)
- On the Map: Why the World Looks the Way it Does (Profile Books Ltd, 2012)
- To the Letter: A Curious History of Correspondence – A Celebration of the Lost Art of Letter Writing (Canongate, 2013)
- (as editor) A Notable Woman: The Romantic Journals of Jean Lucey Pratt. (Canongate, 2015)
- Timekeepers: How The World Became Obsessed With Time (Canongate, 2016)
- In Miniature: How Small Things Illuminate The World (Canongate, 2018)
- Dog's Best Friend: A Brief History of an Unbreakable Bond (HarperCollins, 2020)
- All the Knowledge in the World: The Extraordinary History of the Encyclopaedia (Orion Publishing, 2022)
- Albertus: The Biography of a Typeface (Weidenfeld & Nicolson, 2023)
- Baskerville: The Biography of a Typeface (Weidenfeld & Nicolson, 2023)
- Comic Sans: The Biography of a Typeface (Weidenfeld & Nicolson, 2023)
- The Pen: A Human History (Canongate, 2026)
