= I'm the King of the Castle =

1970 novel by Susan Hill

- First edition (UK)
- Author: Susan Hill
- Original title: I'm the King of the Castle
- Language: English
- Genre: Novel
- Publisher: Hamish Hamilton (UK); Viking (US)
- Publication date: 3 Sep 1970
- Publication place: England
- English publication date: 3 Sep 1970
- Pages: 252
- ISBN: 0-241-01910-9

I'm the King of the Castle is a 1970 novel by English writer Susan Hill. The 1989 French film Je suis le seigneur du château directed by Régis Wargnier is loosely based on the novel. The novel won Somerset Maugham Award in 1971.

== Plot summary ==
Joseph Hooper has inherited a large house, Warings, where he lives with his 10-year-old son Edmund. They have a cold, formal relationship that lacks any compassion. Joseph announces that a housekeeper will be moving in with her son, who is of a similar age to Edmund. Helena Kingshaw and her son Charles arrive at Warings. Edmund becomes defensive of his house, and instantly takes a dislike to Charles, whom he proceeds to taunt and bully.

The family take a trip to Leydell Castle, where Charles exploits Edmund's own fears as they climb the ancient monument. Edmund falls and is badly injured. As he recovers, it appears that Charles is becoming more independent, and he meets a local boy by the name of Fielding. Fielding appears confident and well-rounded, and takes Charles to his farm where he witnesses the birth of a calf. This is in stark contrast to Warings, which is filled with death and morbidity. Fielding offers Charles hope away from the manipulative clutches of Edmund. Once Edmund returns to health, the regime of taunting resumes. Edmund's cruelty climaxes, and Charles is devastated when he discovers that Helena and Joseph have agreed to marry, and that Edmund and Charles will attend school together. The novel ends with Charles committing suicide by drowning himself in the familiar stream in Hang Wood and Mrs. Kingshaw comforting Edmund, who is described as feeling triumphant.

== Reception ==
A 1970 book review by Kirkus Reviews summarized; "Miss Hill's misbegotten little blighters are not particularly prepossessing or pitiable but one reads their story fastened on to the inevitable worst in whatever form it will take."
