= In the Springtime of the Year =

1973 novel by Susan Hill

- First edition
- Author: Susan Hill
- Language: English
- Publisher: Hamish Hamilton
- Publication date: 1973
- Publication place: United Kingdom
- Pages: 188
- ISBN: 0-241-02437-4

In the Springtime of the Year is a 1973 novel by Susan Hill. Hill has stated that the book was inspired by the sudden death from a heart attack of her fiance, David Lepine, an organist at Coventry Cathedral, and thus is, in terms of emotional content at least, semi-autobiographical.

== Plot ==
The novel opens with the protagonist Ruth Bryce, alone in her cottage garden. The reader senses that something momentous has happened and slowly it is revealed that Ruth's husband Ben, a forester, has recently been killed, in an accident in the woods, by a falling tree. They have been married for just one happy year. Throughout the following pages, as the seasons turn, the grief of the twenty year old widow, her self-imposed isolation, her uncomfortable relationships with her in-laws and with neighbours, are explored. The only person whose company she can tolerate is that of her fourteen year old brother-in-law, Joe. Gradually, Ruth has to solve the problems of trying to eat, trying to sleep, whether to view her husband's body, when to visit his grave, what to do with his possessions, how to keep up her home darning and sewing work, at what point to learn the circumstances of Ben's death, how to deal with the thought and the reality of being alone for the rest of her life and how to deal with other people who are also mourning the young man's death. The novel is considered a touching, subtle, masterpiece on the subject of love, loss and the stages of grief.

== Reception ==
A 1974 book review by Kirkus Reviews concluded: "Susan Hill is the most uncompromising of writers and this is a monochrome of rural England where lives proceed in synergistic harmony with the natural world around them were it not for that whim of fate... Once again Miss Hill's novel achieves a consummate simplicity—we cannot fault its deliberate tonelessness without acknowledging its universality."
