= Pritt =

German adhesive manufacturing company

- Headquarters: Düsseldorf, Germany
- Products: Adhesives
- Owner: Henkel
- Website: www.prittworld.com

Pritt is a brand of adhesives, tapes, correction, and fixing products designed and marketed by Henkel. Pritt invented the world's first glue stick, also known as the Pritt Stick, which is a solid adhesive in a twistable casing.

== History ==
In 1967, Henkel researcher Dr Wolfgang Dierichs and his team took inspiration from John Lemings and developed a similar glue stick that resembled a lipstick in a twistable casing. The Pritt Stick was first marketed in 1969, and by 1971 was available in 38 countries. In 2001 the Pritt Stick was successfully tested on board the International Space Station and was awarded Space Proof Quality.

In 2003, the PowerPritt, a KidsArt correction roller, was introduced, followed in 2004 by the PowerPritt gel and the PowerPritt stick. In 2006 the Pritt tape range was introduced.
