= Nick Meers =

British photographer

Nick Meers (born 1955) is a British landscape photographer and is the co-author of many published books that include his photography.

Meers grew up in the Cotswolds and was educated at Bryanston School in Dorset. He studied photography at Guildford, and then at West Surrey College of Art and Design, leaving in 1978 to shoot his first travel books on Paris, Amsterdam and the National Parks of California. His work in landscape photography is well-known, as is his pioneering panoramic photography. During his career as a photographer, he has worked mainly in Europe Africa and North America, shooting for magazines and photo libraries, but many of his best-known 'low-light' photographs are of English landscapes. The National Trust holds many of his photographs. He has taught in the UK and US. He was a member of the Association of Photographers and the International Association of Panoramic Photographers.

For Panoramas of English Gardens, depicting twenty gardens, he used several panoramic cameras, one of them home-made, which necessitated composing the views both upside down and back to front with his head underneath a traditional black cloth. The resulting 'letterbox-shaped' images gave unusual insights into the gardens by sometimes incorporating dual viewpoints without visual distortion of the scene. Having shot three books in the panoramic format, Nick was commissioned to write Stretch: The World of Panoramic Photography which included both a historical overview of panoramic cameras but also revealing and amusing interviews with several of the world's top panoramic photographers, and is a showcase of their work as well as his own.

Meers has given many workshops and lectures about his travel and panoramic work in Britain and North America, and continues to experiment with new ways to show the world around us, from large format sheet film cameras to smaller mirrorless cameras, and shoots vast landscapes and tiny details.

== Books ==
Nick Meers has produced photographs for over 30 books, some as co-author, including the following:

- Panoramas of England, by Adam Nicolson, Nick Meers. 1988. ISBN 978-0-297-83092-4. 2000. ISBN 978-1-85799-947-1.
- Spirit of the Cotswolds, by Susan Hill, Nick Meers (photographer). 1988. ISBN 978-0-7181-2905-7. 1990. ISBN 978-0-7181-3299-6.
- Enigmatic England, by Nick Meers, Sue Seddon. 1991. ISBN 978-0-86299-626-0.
- Panoramas of English Gardens, by David Wheeler, Nick Meers. 1991. ISBN 978-0-316-93251-6.
- Panoramas of English Villages, by Anthony Quiney, Nick Meers. 2000. ISBN 978-1-85799-946-4.
- Year in the Garden: In England, Wales and Northern Ireland, by John Sales, Margaret Willes, Nick Meers (photographer), Stephen Robson (photographer). 2001. ISBN 978-0-8109-6731-1.
- Stretch: The World of Panoramic Photography, by Nick Meers (photography), Leo L. Larson (introduction). 2003. ISBN 978-2-88046-692-3.
