= Do Me a Favour (novel) =

1963 novel by Susan Hill

- First edition
- Author: Susan Hill
- Language: English
- Publisher: Hutchinson
- Publication place: United Kingdom

Do Me a Favour was the second novel written by Susan Hill, published in 1963.
