= The Vows of Silence =

2008 novel by Susan Hill

- First edition (publ. Chatto & Windus)
- Author: Susan Hill
- Language: English
- Publisher: Chatto & Windus
- Publication date: 2008
- Publication place: United Kingdom
- Dewey Decimal: 823/.914
- LC Class: PR6058.I45 V69

The Vows of Silence is a novel by Susan Hill. It is the fourth in a series of "Simon Serrailler" crime novels.
