= Susan Hill =

English author (born 1942)

Dame Susan Hill DBE
- Born: Susan Elizabeth Hill; 5 February 1942 (age 84); Scarborough, North Yorkshire, England
- Citizenship: UK
- Education: King's College London
- Occupation: Author
- Spouse(s): Sir Stanley Wells (m. 1975; sep. 2011)
- Children: 3
- Writing career
- Genres: Fiction; Non-fiction
- Notable works: The Woman in Black; The Mist in the Mirror; I'm the King of the Castle

Dame Susan Elizabeth Hill, Lady Wells (born 5 February 1942) is an English author of fiction and non-fiction works. Her novels include The Woman in Black, which has been adapted for stage and screen, The Mist in the Mirror, and I'm the King of the Castle, for which she received the Somerset Maugham Award in 1971. She also won the Whitbread Novel Award in 1972 for The Bird of Night, which was also shortlisted for the Booker Prize.

She was appointed Commander of the Order of the British Empire (CBE) in the 2012 Birthday Honours and Dame Commander of the Order of the British Empire (DBE) in the 2020 Birthday Honours, both for services to literature.

== Early life and education ==
Hill was born in Scarborough, North Yorkshire. Her home town was later referred to in her novel A Change for the Better (1969) and in some short stories like Cockles and Mussels.

She attended Scarborough Convent School, where she became interested in theatre and literature. Her family left Scarborough in 1958 and moved to Coventry where her father worked in car and aircraft factories. Hill states that she attended a girls' grammar school, Barr's Hill. Her fellow pupils included Jennifer Page, the first Chief Executive of the Millennium Dome. At Barrs Hill, she took A levels in English, French, History, and Latin, proceeding to an English degree at King's College London.

== Writing career ==
By the time she took her A levels, she had already written her first novel, The Enclosure, which was published by Hutchinson in her first year at university.

Her next novel Gentleman and Ladies was published in 1968 and was runner-up for the John Llewellyn Rhys Prize. This was followed in quick succession by A Change for the Better, I'm the King of the Castle, The Albatross and Other Stories, Strange Meeting, The Bird of Night, A Bit of Singing and Dancing and In the Springtime of the Year, all written and published between 1968 and 1974.

In 2008, Hill began a series of crime novels featuring detective Simon Serrailler.

== Publishing ==
In the 1990s, Hill founded her own publishing company, Long Barn Books, which has published two Simon Serrailler short stories and The Magic Apple Tree, all by Susan Hill, as well as The Dream Coat by Adèle Geras, Colouring In by Angela Huth, and Counting My Chickens by Deborah Devonshire.

== Style and adaptations ==
Hill's novels are written in a descriptive gothic style, especially her ghost story The Woman in Black, published in 1983. She has expressed an interest in the traditional English ghost story, which relies on suspense and atmosphere to create its impact, similar to the classic ghost stories by M. R. James and Daphne du Maurier. The novel was turned into a play in 1987 which ran until 2022 in the West End of London. It was also made into a television film in 1989, and a film by Hammer Film Productions in 2012; the latter, starring Daniel Radcliffe, was the most successful British horror film in 32 years as of 2013. Hill wrote another ghost story with similar ingredients, The Mist in the Mirror in 1992, and wrote the screenplay for a sequel to The Woman in Black film in 2012, that film being released in 2014.

She wrote a sequel to Daphne du Maurier's Rebecca entitled Mrs de Winter in 1993.

== Personal life ==
Hill was engaged to David Lepine, organist at Coventry Cathedral, but he died of a heart attack in 1972. In 1975, she married Shakespeare scholar and professor Stanley Wells, and they moved to Stratford-upon-Avon. Their first daughter, author Jessica Ruston, was born in 1977, and their third daughter, Clemency, was born in 1985. A middle daughter, Imogen, was born prematurely, and died at the age of five weeks. Wells was chairperson of the Shakespeare's Birthplace Trust for 20 years. The couple later lived in Chipping Campden.

In 2013, it was reported that Hill had left her husband and moved in with Barbara Machin, creator of Waking the Dead, who adapted Hill's crime fiction novels featuring detective Simon Serrailler and Hill's The Small Hand. However, in 2015 she stated she was "still married" to Wells.

== Works ==
=== Novels ===
- The Enclosure, Hutchinson 1961
- Do Me a Favour, Hutchinson 1963
- Gentleman and Ladies, Hamish Hamilton 1968; Penguin Paperback 1970
- A Change for the Better, Hamish Hamilton 1969; Penguin Paperback 1971
- I'm the King of the Castle, Hamish Hamilton 1970; Penguin Paperback 1972
- Strange Meeting, Hamish Hamilton 1971; Penguin Paperback 1974
- The Bird of Night, Hamish Hamilton 1972; Penguin Paperback 1973
- In the Springtime of the Year, Hamish Hamilton 1973; Penguin Paperback 1974
- The Woman in Black - A Ghost Story, Hamish Hamilton Penguin Paperback 1983; Mandarin Paperback 1989; Vintage Paperback 1999
- Air and Angels, Sinclair Stevenson 1991; Mandarin Paperback 1993; Vintage 1999
- The Mist in the Mirror: A Ghost Story, Hamish Hamilton 1992; Mandarin paperback 1993; Vintage 1999
- Mrs de Winter, Sinclair Stevenson 1993; Mandarin Paperback 1994; Vintage 1999
- The Service of Clouds, Chatto & Windus 1998; Vintage 1999
- Simon Serrailler crime novels:
  - The Various Haunts of Men, Vintage, 2005
  - The Pure in Heart, Vintage, 2006
  - The Risk of Darkness, Chatto & Windus, 2006
  - The Vows of Silence, Chatto & Windus, 2008
  - The Shadows in the Street, 2010
  - The Betrayal of Trust, 2011
  - A Question of Identity, 2012
  - The Soul of Discretion, 2014
  - The Comforts of Home, 2018
  - The Benefit of Hindsight, 2019
  - A Change of Circumstance, 2021
- The Man in the Picture: A Ghost Story, 2007 Profile Books
- The Beacon, 2008 Chatto and Windus
- The Small Hand: A Ghost Story, 2010. Profile Books
- A Kind Man, 2011
- Dolly: A Ghost Story, 2012. Profile Books Ltd.
- Black Sheep, 2013. Chatto and Windus (144p)
- From the Heart, 2017 Chatto and Windus

=== Short story collections ===
- The Albatross and Other Stories, Hamish Hamilton 1970; Penguin 1972
- A Bit of Singing and Dancing, Hamish Hamilton 1973; Penguin 1974
- Listening to the Orchestra, Long Barn Books 1997
- The Boy Who Taught the Beekeeper to Read, Chatto and Windus July 2003
- Farthing House: And Other Stories, Long Barn Books, 2006
- The Travelling Bag and Other Ghostly Stories, Profile Books, Sep 2016

=== Chapbook ===
- The Custodian, Covent Garden Press 1972

=== Non fiction ===
- The Magic Apple Tree, (autobiography) Hamish Hamilton, 1982; Penguin 1985; Long Barn Books 1998
- Through the Kitchen Window, Illustrated by Angela Barrett, Hamish Hamilton 1984; Penguin 1986
- Through the Garden Gate, (Illustrated by Angela Barrett), Hamish Hamilton, 1986
- The Lighting of the Lamps, (Collected pieces) Hamish Hamilton, 1987
- Shakespeare Country, (photographs by Talbot and Whiteman) Michael Joseph, 1987
- The Spirit of the Cotswolds, (photographs by Nick Meers), Michael Joseph, 1988
- Family, (Autobiography) Michael Joseph, 1989
- Reflections from a Garden, (Illustrated by Ian Stephens; written with Rory Stuart) Pavilion Books 1995
- Howards End is on the Landing Profile Books, 2009
- Jacob's Room is Full of Books: A Year of Reading , Profile Books, 2017

=== Plays ===
- The Cold Country and Other Plays for Radio (includes The End of Summer, Lizard in the Grass, Consider the Lilies, Strip Jack Naked); London, BBC Publications, 1975.
- Lizard in the Grass, broadcast 1971; produced Edinburgh, 1988
- On the Face of It, broadcast 1975; published in Act 1, edited by David Self and Ray Speakman, London, Hutchinson, 1979
- The Ramshackle Company (for children); produced London, 1981
- Chances, broadcast 1981; produced London, 1983.

=== Children's stories ===
- One Night at a Time, Hamish Hamilton 1984; Puffin 1986
- Mother's Magic, Hamish Hamilton 1985; Puffin 1986
- Can it be True?; (illustrated by Angela Barrett) Hamish Hamilton 1987; Puffin 1988; Walker Books 1990
- Susie's Shoes, (illustrated by Priscilla Lamont), Hamish Hamilton 1989; Puffin 1990
- Stories from Codling Village, (illustrated by Caroline Crosland) Walker Books 1990
- I've Forgotten Edward, Walker Books and Sainsburys 1990
- I Won't Go there Again, Walker Books 1990
- Pirate Poll (illustrated by Priscilla Lamont), Hamish Hamilton 1991; Puffin 1992
- The Glass Angels, Walker Books 1991, Paperback 1993
- Beware, Beware, (illustrated by Angela Barrett), Walker Books 1993, Paperback 1994
- King of King's, (illustrated by John Lawrence), Walker Books 1994
- The Christmas Collection: An Anthology (illustrated: John Lawrence), Walker Books 1995
- The Battle for Gullywith, 2008

== Awards and honours ==
- 1971 Somerset Maugham Award – I'm the King of the Castle
- 1972 Booker Prize shortlist – The Bird of Night
- 1972 Whitbread Novel Award – The Bird of Night
- 1972 John Llewellyn Rhys Prize – The Albatross
- 1975 Fellow of the Royal Society of Literature
- 1988 Nestlé Smarties Book Prize (Gold Award, 6–8 years category) – Can It Be True?: A Christmas Story
- 2012 CBE
- 2020 DBE
