= Sinclair-Stevenson =

British book publisher founded in 1989

- Status: Defunct
- Founded: 1989
- Founder: Christopher Sinclair-Stevenson (1939–2025)
- Successor: Random House
- Country of origin: United Kingdom
- Publication types: books

Sinclair-Stevenson Ltd was a British publisher founded in 1989 by Christopher Sinclair-Stevenson.

Christopher Sinclair-Stevenson became an editor at Hamish Hamilton in 1961. Thirteen years later in 1974 he became managing director, establishing "a close-knit and successful team", he "developed an unrivalled reputation for looking after his authors". Then in 1989 he resigned and set up his own company, Sinclair-Stevenson Ltd, and took a number of staff and authors with him.

In 1992, the company was sold at a loss to Reed. Sinclair-Stevenson Ltd was subsumed into the Random House Group in February 1997 with the purchase of the Reed Consumer Trade Division. The company was finally wound up in 2000.
