= Dignitas =

Dignitas may refer to:

- Dignitas (Roman concept), a Roman virtue
- Dignitas (non-profit organisation), organization providing physician-assisted suicide
- Dignitas International, a humanitarian organisation
- Dignitas (esports), a US-based esports team
- Dignitas personae, a Vatican instruction on bioethics

== See also ==
- Dignity (disambiguation)
