= Dignity (disambiguation) =

Dignity is the right of a person to be valued and respected for their own sake.

Dignity may refer to:

== Concepts ==
- Dignitas (Roman concept), an ancient Roman political idea to do with the influence of a citizen
- Dignitatis humanae, the Second Vatican Council's Declaration on religious freedom
- Four Dignities of Shambhala Buddhism

== Non-governmental organisations ==
- Dignitas (assisted dying organisation), a Swiss group that assists people with terminal illnesses to die
- Dignitas International, a medical humanitarian organisation that aims to increase access to life-saving treatment and prevention in areas overwhelmed by HIV/AIDS
- Dignité (Centrale des Syndicats Libres de Côte d'Ivoire), a trade union centre in the Côte d'Ivoire, Africa
- DignityUSA and Dignity Canada, organisations of lesbian, gay, bisexual, and transgender Catholics that work for 'respect and justice' for LGBT people in the Catholic Church
- Dignity Village, a collective of homeless people that have created a shanty town near Oregon, USA

== Political parties ==
- Ar-Namys ("Dignity"), Kyrgyzstan
- Dignity, Democracy, Motherland, Armenia
- Dignity Party (Algeria)
- Dignity Party (Egypt)
- Dignity Party (South Australia)

== Music ==
- "Dignity" (Deacon Blue song), a song by Deacon Blue on their 1987 album Raintown
- "Dignity", a song by Katey Sagal on her 1994 album Well...
- "Dignity" (Bob Dylan song), a song by Bob Dylan on his 1994 album Bob Dylan's Greatest Hits Volume 3
- "Dignity", a song by Crash on the 2003 album The Massive Crush
- Dignity (album), a 2007 album by Hilary Duff, or the title song
- "Dignity", a song by Bullet for My Valentine on their 2010 album Fever
- "Dignity" (New Politics song), a song by New Politics on their 2010 album "New Politics"
- "Dignity", a song by Opeth on their 2019 album In Cauda Venenum
- "Dignity", a song by Porcupine Tree on their 2022 album Closure/Continuation
- Dignity (band), a Dutch R&B group from the late 1990s

== Others ==
- Dignity Battalions, paramilitary combatants under the Manuel Noriega Regime in Panama in the 1980s
- Dignity Memorial, a brand of Service Corporation International, which markets funeral and other deathcare services in Canada and USA under the Dignity Memorial and other brands
- Dignity plc, a UK funeral company, which from 1994 to 2002 was part of Service Corporation International
- Dignity (statue), 50-foot high, lighted sculpture of an Indigenous woman, atop a bluff in Chamberlain, South Dakota, honoring the Lakota and Dakota Peoples
- Dignity, a ship used by the Free Gaza Movement; see December 2008 Gaza Strip airstrikes#Dignity incident

== See also ==
- The Dignity of Labour, a 1979 album by The Human League
- Dignity and Shame, a 2005 album by Crooked Fingers
