= Bourbon Argos =

NGO-operated former offshore supply vessel used in migrant rescue

History
- Name: Bourbon Argos
- Owner: Bourbon Offshore Greenmar
- Operator: Médecins Sans Frontières &; Migrant Offshore Aid Station; (2015)
- Port of registry: Luxembourg
- Builder: Bharati Shipyard
- Yard number: 356
- Completed: April 2013
- Identification: IMO number: 9390082; MMSI number: 253123000

General characteristics
- Type: anchor handling tug supply vessel; sea rescue ship
- Tonnage: 2343 GT
- Length: 68.6-metre (225 ft 1 in)
- Beam: 15.4-metre (50 ft 6 in)
- Propulsion: 2x Maschinenbau Kiel four-stroke eight-cylinder diesel engines

The Bourbon Argos is an anchor handling tug supply vessel from the oil & gas offshore marine servicing company Bourbon Offshore Greenmar, and sails under the Luxembourg flag.

The ship was chartered to Médecins Sans Frontières (MSF) in 2015. The organization equipped Bourbon Argos as a sea rescue ship.

== Description ==
The ship is a 68-metre (223 ft 1 in)-long anchor handling tug. The ship is propelled by two four-stroke eight-cylinder diesel engines made by Maschinenbau Kiel (MaK), each with an output of 4,000 kW (5,400 hp). The motors act on two variable-pitch propellers, both of which are mounted in a ducted enclosure. The ship also has two transverse thrust control systems in the bow and another transverse thrust control system in the stern area. Two shaft generators with an output of 1600 kW each (apparent power 2000 kVA), two auxiliary generators with each 350 kW output (apparent power 438 kVA) and an emergency generator with 72 kW output (apparent power 90 kVA) are available for the power supply.

The ship has a dynamic positioning system (DP 2). The bollard pull of the ship is 136 t. The ship has a 420 m^{2} (4,500 sq ft) open working deck behind the superstructure. A total of 800 t of goods and equipment can be carried here. The deck can be loaded with 5t/m^{2}. There are six single cabins, eight double cabins, two four-bed cabins and a hospital on board. A total of 30 people can be accommodated in the cabins.

== Construction and career ==
Bourbon Argos was built under construction number 356 at Bharati Shipyard Limited, Ratnagiri and completed in April 2013.

In 2015 the ship was converted for use as a rescue ship. Containers were set up on deck with an emergency room, an examination room, a dressing room, a room for hygiene materials and a store; a morgue was also set up. The ship is operated by the Maltese organization Migrant Offshore Aid Station (MOAS) and MSF. The Bourbon Argos can take 300 to 350 people on board. A team of doctors, nurses, logisticians, water and sanitation experts and intercultural mediators is on board. 15 nautical crew members are responsible for the ship's technology. In addition to medical help for boat refugees in the Mediterranean, relief supplies are distributed to those who have been rescued.

On 9 May 2015, the ship left the port of Augusta, Sicily, for a four-month SAR campaign in the Mediterranean. On 6 August, more than 613 people were saved. Together with the second ship of MOAS, the motor yacht Phoenix, a refugee boat was saved from capsizing by convincing those occupants who could swim to jump into the water and hold on to inflatable life buoys. The refugees came, among others, from Syria, Eritrea and Bangladesh.

On 17 August 2016, an unknown ship fired several shots in the direction of the Bourbon Argos, which was located around 25 nautical miles (46 km; 29 mi) off the Libyan coast. The MSF staff claimed that the ship was hit in the area of the bridge and that they then withdrew to the ship's shelter while strangers searched the ship. A Libyan Coast Guard commander later stated that warning shots were fired when the Bourbon Argos failed to comply with a request to identify themselves.
