= The Truth About Alcohol =

2016 BBC documentary

The Truth About Alcohol is a 2016 BBC documentary that explores common beliefs about alcohol. It was made after the UK lowered the recommended amount of alcohol for men to match women's at about the equivalent of seven imperial pints (4 L) of beer per week. It follows Javid Abdelmoneim as he explores the effects of alcohol on the body. The purpose of the documentary was to inform people about the realities of alcohol and its effects on the body as well as answer questions about why some people are more sensitive to alcohol, hangover remedies, the benefits of red wine, drinking on an empty stomach, effects of nightcaps on sleep, and other common questions.

== Synopsis ==
According to the documentary, alcohol affects many different aspects. These include numbing pain and losing self-control. Besides drinking water to prevent dehydration, other possible solutions were explored in the documentary. The film stated that though red wine is better for you, there are other foods that can provide the same health benefits, and that lining stomach with food does help with alcohol tolerance. The documentary states that nightcaps help people fall asleep faster and result in deeper sleep the first half of the night, but can lead to more interrupted sleep for the second half of the night. It says that people believe that beer gets people less drunk, hangovers get worse with age, and that women get worse hangovers than men. This film claimed that in actuality none of these things are true.

The limits changed from 21 to 14 units of alcohol per week spread out throughout the week for men in the UK—the equivalent of about seven pints of beer. One of the main reasons for the change in the recommended limit is how much cancer is related to alcohol consumption.

== Reception ==
Sam Wollaston writes in The Guardian that the documentary is "insubstantial but addictive" and adds no new knowledge about alcohol. The BBC covered the documentary.

== Crew ==
The director was David Briggs. The producers were Sam Anthony, David Briggs, and Phillip Smith.
