= Unni Karunakara =

Humanitarian doctor

- Born: Alappuzha, Kerala, India
- Education: Kasturba Medical College; Johns Hopkins University; Yale University
- Organization: Drugs for Neglected Diseases Initiative
- Known for: International President of Médecins Sans Frontières (2010 to 2013)

Unni Karunakara is an Indian-born public health physician, an academic, and was the international president of Médecins Sans Frontières (MSF) from 2010 to 2013.

Karunakara has worked in humanitarian emergencies in Africa, Asia, and Latin America and held leadership roles at MSF headquarters in the Netherlands and Switzerland. He has held fellowships and has been faculty at universities in Africa, Asia, and Europe. After his three years leading MSF, he cycled 5,637 kilometres to raise funds to pay back his salary.

He has served on the board of directors of MSF Netherlands, MSF India, and the Drugs for Neglected Diseases Initiative.

== Early life and education ==
Karunakara was born in Alappuzha. He has a degree in medicine from Kasturba Medical College, and degrees in public health from Johns Hopkins University and Yale University.

== Career ==
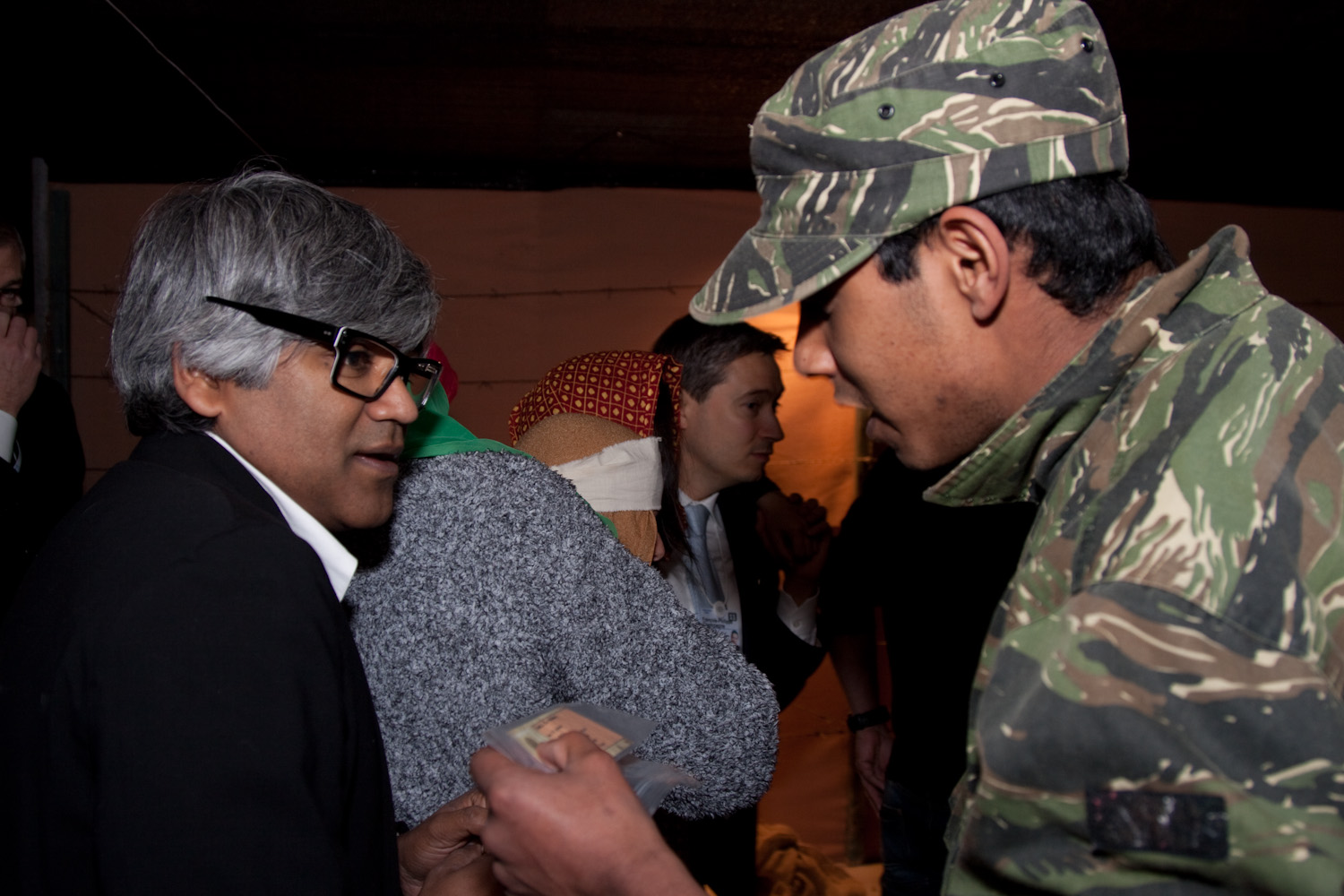
Karunakara (left), 2011

Karunakara has held research and academic fellowships at universities in Germany, South Africa, the United Kingdom, and Zimbabwe, including as a senior fellow at Jackson Institute for Global Affairs from 2014 to 2017. His research focussed on forced migration, and healthcare for people in humanitarian crises. He was the deputy director of Health at Columbia University's The Earth Institute, Millennium Villages Project, and the assistant clinical professor at the Mailman School of Public Health. As of 2020, he was a visiting faculty at Tshinghua University, and a Shinhan Distinguished visiting professor at Yonsei University.

Karunakara joined Médecins Sans Frontières in 1995 where he managed a tuberculosis program in Ethiopia, before working in Azerbaijan, Bangladesh, Brazil, and the Democratic Republic of the Congo as a medical coordinator. In 2002, he moved to MSF's Amsterdam headquarters to work as the medical director before leading the Campaign for Access to Essential Medicines from 2005 until 2007. While at MSF, Karunakara led a process to reform the governing International Statutes as part of a wider reform of the organization's governance. Over 112 days in 2014, Karunakara cycled 5,673 kilometres from Srinagar to Thiruvananthapuram to raise funds to pay his salary back to MSF. He raised $120,000.

Karunakara served on the board of directors of MSF Netherlands, MSF India, and the Drugs for Neglected Diseases Initiative from 2010 to 2013.
