= Triage: Dr. James Orbinski's Humanitarian Dilemma =

Documentary about Rwandan genocide and Somalia Civil War

- Directed by: Patrick Reed
- Written by: Michelle Latimer; Peter Raymont; Patrick Reed
- Produced by: Peter Raymont
- Starring: James Orbinski
- Cinematography: John Westheuser
- Edited by: Michelle Hozer
- Music by: Mark Korven
- Production company: White Pine Pictures
- Release date: 2007
- Running time: 88 minutes
- Country: Canada
- Language: English

Triage: Dr. James Orbinski's Humanitarian Dilemma is a 2007 Canadian documentary film directed by Patrick Reed about the work of James Orbinski, the president of Médecins Sans Frontières.

== Production ==
Triage is filmed in Cinéma vérité style and was produced by Peter Raymont and Silva Basmajian of White Pine Pictures with support from the National Film Board of Canada. The cinematography is done by John Westheuser.

== Plot ==
Triage follows Orbinski on retrospective visits to Baidoa and Kigali, where he led Médecins Sans Frontières' humanitarian medical responses to the Somali Civil War in 1993 and the Rwanda genocide in 1994.

The central theme in the documentary is that of triage: the challenges faced in deciding who gets medical care and who does not.

Interviews with Orbinski touch upon the personal risks he faced but focus more on the wider politics of humanitarian action and the need for relief agencies to operate with independence from political forces. The tension between the humanitarian organizations trying to keep political distance from the United Nations peacekeeping forces that they rely upon for safety is a central theme.

== Festivals ==
Triage was shown at the 2008 Sundance film festival, the 2008 AFI Silverdocks film festival, and at the South by Southwest festival in 2008.

== Critical reception ==
Exclaim! described Triage as "intelligent and worth viewing."

Marc Glassman, writing for Classical FM, describes watching the documentary as a rough journey that is worth making.

John Anderson, writing in Variety, praised the production value, especially the sound, and credited the director's seamless switching between original content and archive footage of interviews.

== See also ==
- Rwandan Genocide
- Somalia Civil War
- An Imperfect Offering: Humanitarian Action for the Twenty-First Century, book by Orbinski
- Shake Hands with the Devil book and film about the peacekeeping efforts during the Rwandan Genocide
