= An Imperfect Offering =

2008 memoir by James Orbinski

- Author: James Orbinski
- Language: English
- Subjects: Humanitarian aid Humanitarian principles Rwandan genocide Médecins Sans Frontières; Somali Civil War
- Genre: Non fiction, autobiography
- Pages: 448
- ISBN: 978-1846041013

An Imperfect Offering: Humanitarian Action for the Twenty-First Century is a 2008 memoir written by James Orbinski M.D., the former international president of Médecins Sans Frontières.

The book expands upon points made by Orbinski in 1999 when he accepted the Nobel Peace Prize on behalf of Médecins Sans Frontières, specifically the importance of humanitarian organisations remaining independent from political forces.

== Plot summary ==
An Imperfect Offering starts with Orbinski's working class upbringing in Montreal, and his decision to study medicine.

The story follows Orbinski as he works in disease outbreaks and conflict zones around the world including in Afghanistan, Chechnya, the Democratic Republic of Congo, Peru, Kosovo, Somalia, Sudan, and Zaire. Orbinski is in charge of the Médecins Sans Frontières healthcare in Rwanda when the 1994 genocide occurs; the book documents horrific violence and Orbinski is scathing of the United Nations failed peacekeeping efforts.

Throughout the book, Orbinski negotiates with warlords and avoids becoming a victim of the violence around him. The narratives stresses the importance that humanitarian organisations retain independence from political forces and publicly condemn human rights abuses.

The final chapters of the book document Orbinski's time after his presidential term has ended and focus on global access to medicines. An Imperfect Offering critiques the pharmaceutical companies and regulatory environment they operate within for their failure to ensure that people in low income countries get the medicine they need.

== Critical reception ==
NPR described An Imperfect Offering as one of their "Best Political And Current Affairs Books Of 2008" and described it as "unflinchingly apolitical."

The Guardian described the book as extraordinary and yet unpretentious with "carefully weighed prose".

== Awards ==
An Imperfect Offering won the 2008 Governor General's Literary Award for non-fiction.

The book won the 2008 Shaughnessy Cohen Prize for Political Writing.

== See also ==
- Triage: Dr. James Orbinski's Humanitarian Dilemma, documentary
- Shake Hands with the Devil (book by Roméo Dallaire about the Rwanda genocide)
- Life on the Ground Floor and Six months in Sudan (books by Médecins Sans Frontières doctor, James Maskalyk)
- Hope in Hell, by Dan Bortolotti
