= Javid Abdelmoneim =

British physician (born c. 1979)

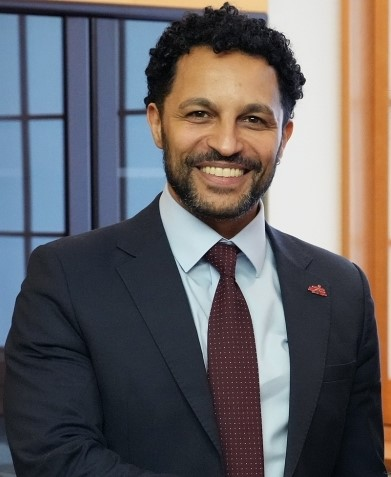
- Javid Abdelmoneim in 2026
- Born: 1979 (age 46–47)
- Education: University College London
- Occupations: Physician and television presenter
- Known for: Médecins Sans Frontières

Javid Abdelmoneim (born c. 1979) is a British physician. He is the International President of Médecins Sans Frontières (elected 26 June 2025), and former television presenter. He works with Médecins Sans Frontières (MSF / Doctors without Borders) which has seen him respond to crises in Iraq (2009), Haiti (2010), South Sudan (2014), Sierra Leone (2014), Syria (2017–2018) and also aboard the Aquarius (2016), a search and rescue ship run in partnership between MSF and SOS Mediteranée. Most recently, Abdelmoneim served as a Member of the Board of Trustees (2015–2021) and was also elected the youngest serving president and chair of the Board (2017–2021) for MSF UK.

During his time in Sierra Leone in 2014, he documented his experiences during the West Africa Ebola epidemic for the BAFTA, Emmy & Grierson, shortlisted Panorama film Ebola Frontline. A film that was broadcast in more than 20 countries globally.

Alongside active service with the NHS and MSF, Abdelmoneim fronted a number of critically acclaimed science and wellbeing programmes for the BBC, Channel 4, HBO and the Al Jazeera network. His filmography includes, amongst others; Foreign Press Association Award, Best Science Story of the Year Winner Al Jazeera medical series The Cure for his episode Operation Gaza (2016); Annual News and Documentary Emmy Awards shortlisted HBO documentary Ebola, The Doctors Story (2017); BAFTA shortlisted BBC Two documentary series No More Boys and Girls (2018) and Royal Television Society (RTS) Scotland Award nominated Channel 4 mini-series How to Stay Well (2018).

Abdelmoneim is also an advocate for humanitarianism through the right to health through his public speaking and writing engagements including the BBC News (2014), The Independent (2014), TEDx (2015), The Hippocratic Post (2017), and DNDi's 15th Anniversary Gala Dinner (2018).

Abdelmoneim was awarded the Ebola Medal for Service in West Africa, but subsequently returned the medal in protest against the hostile environment in healthcare towards migrants in the UK.

In August 2021, Abdelmoneim was appointed a trustee of the Royal College of Emergency Medicine.

== Early life and education ==
Born in Cambridge, England to Sudanese Iranian parents, Javid spent his first seven years in Khartoum, Sudan, before returning to Cambridge for schooling. He calls Britain home but has lived, worked and travelled to approximately 80 countries in the world. In addition to English, he speaks French, Arabic, and Persian.

Abdelmoneim studied medicine at University College London, then he undertook postgraduate training in emergency medicine. He obtained a diploma form London School of Hygiene & Tropical Medicine in tropical medicine. He is a Member and a Fellow of the Royal College of Physicians and a Trustee of the Royal College of Emergency Medicine.

== Career ==
=== Médecins Sans Frontières (Doctors without Borders) ===
Abdelmoneim became involved with Médecins Sans Frontières (MSF) in his second year of university as a medical student, working with the Access Campaign to promote the accessibility of medicines for neglected diseases. He has since worked with MSF on a number of assignments and in a number of different capacities while also serving as a registrar in Emergency Medicine for the NHS Trust in London.

Most recently, Abdelmoneim served as a Member of the MSF UK Board of Trustees (2015–2021) and was also elected the youngest serving president and chair of the Board (2017–2021) for MSF UK.

Prior to this, his first MSF mission took him to Basra, Iraq in 2009, where he worked as an emergency room doctor at Jumhuree Hospital. The focus of the work was to provide advanced life support, trauma life support and resuscitation training and to put in place mass casualty procedures in the run up to Iraq's first general election in Spring 2010.

The next year, Abdelmoneim travelled to Haiti after the devastating 2010 earthquake where he spent six months working as an emergency room doctor, treating trauma patients and running the internal medicine and intensive care departments within the MSF hospital.

In 2014, he joined MSF's team of flying doctors, nurses, and logisticians in South Sudan. Travelling by helicopter or plane, depending on the weather, Abdelmoneim and his colleagues would arrive at a remote destination around noon and open at 8am the next day. In the space of an afternoon, the team would have to hire and train local staff and build the clinic and place to sleep.

Later that same year, Abdelmoneim undertook a project in Kailahun, Sierra Leone, where he worked in Ebola Management Centre treating Ebola patients. During his time in Sierra Leone, Abdelmoneim featured in the critically acclaimed BBC One Panorama documentary, 'Ebola Frontline'.

In 2016, Abdelmoneim worked aboard the Aquarius (2016), a search and rescue ship run in partnership between MSF and SOS Mediteranée. During his time on the ship, he tended to those recued at sea in the Mediterranean, providing medical care to those on board.

In 2017, Abdelmoneim travelled to Raqqa, Syria where he spent a month working in a trauma clinic set-up by MSF in one of the few houses left standing in the city.

=== Television ===
Abdelmoneim fronted a number of critically acclaimed science and wellbeing programmes for the BBC, Channel 4, HBO and the Al Jazeera network.

Between 2012 and 2015, Abdelmoneim was a presenter and host for The Cure, a medical series that showcases innovations and solutions in healthcare around the world. In 2016, the programme won the Foreign Press Association -Best Science Story of the Year Award for his episode Operation Gaza.

In 2014, Abdelmoneim documented his experiences in Sierra Leone during the West Africa Ebola epidemic for BAFTA, Emmy & Grierson shortlisted Panorama film Ebola Frontline. A film that was broadcast in more than 20 countries globally.

In 2015, he presented the BBC One episode The Truth About Alcohol. In 2016, HBO revisited his Ebola documentary: Ebola, The Doctors Story aired on the channel and was nominated for the 38th Annual News and Documentary Emmy Awards: Outstanding Science and Technology Documentary in 2017. That same year, he also presented Refugee Camp: Our Dessert Home on BBC Two, together with Anita Rani and Ben Timberlake where the team immersed themselves in the life of the Zaatari refugee camp in Jordan.

The next year (2017), Abdelmoneim co-hosted Channel 4 mini-series How to Stay Well together with Dr Helen Lawal and Dr Phil Kieran which went on to be nominated for the Royal Television Society (RTS) Scotland Award in 2018. In the same year, he also presented the BAFTA shortlisted BBC Two documentary series No More Boys and Girls, in which a primary school, under his guidance, experimented with gender-neutral language and activities.

In 2018, he presented on a number of BBC programmes including BBC Four's Contagion! The BBC Four Pandemic with co-host Hannah Fry which explored the possible impact of a flu pandemic; BBC One's one-off special on Type 2 diabetes The Big Crash Diet Experiment and featured as a special guest on The One Show with presenters Matt Baker and Alex Jones (episode dated 29 May 2018).

In 2019, Abdelmoneim fronted a 60-minute film for BBC Two's Horizon: Horizon – Cannabis: Miracle Medicine or Dangerous Drug?.

In 2020, he presented a one-off COVID-19 pandemic special for Channel 4: Coronavirus: How Clean is Your House? together with virologist, Dr Lisa Cross, which looked at how the virus works its way into our home, and which behaviours and cleaning products can help prevent spread of the virus. In the same year, he also co-presented How to Beat...Stress…Fat…Pain…Aging with Kate Quilton, and was the special reporter for BBC Two's Trust Me, I'm a Doctor (Episode #9.2).

In 2021, Abdelmoneim became the Resident Doctor on Channel 4's daytime show Steph's Packed Lunch with Steph McGovern, and co-presented the TV series How to Lose Weight Well with Dr Helen Lawal.

== Filmography ==
=== Television ===
Year	Title	Channel	Role	Notes
2012–2015	The Cure Reporting and filming locations include: 1. Operation Gaza, Gaza; 2. On the Trail of Sleeping Sickness, Democratic Republic of Congo (MSF)*; 3. Pedal Medics, Kenya; 4. Mission Malaria, Nigeria; 5. The Calais 'Jungle' Clinic, France (MSF)*; 6. The Good Doctor, Pakistan; 7. Pain Killer, USA; 8. 3-D Printed Prosthetics, Brazil; 9. New Knees for the Old, Japan; 10. Finding a Cure for Kala Azar, Ethiopia & Japan; 11. Building Blood, Scotland; 12. Shoulder Patch, England; 13. Hero Rats, Tanzania; 14. Tackling Drug Resistant TB, Armenia (MSF)*; 15. Safe Surgery Innovations, Uganda; 16. Rehabilitation Clinic for Victims of War, Jordan (MSF)*; 17. Bionic Eye, Holland	Al Jazeera	Presenter	
2014	Panorama 'Ebola Frontline'	BBC One		
2015	The Truth About...	BBC One	Presenter	
2016	Ebola, The Doctors Story	HBO		
2016	Refugee Camp: Our Desert Home	BBC Two	Co-presenter	With Anita Rani and Ben Timberlake
2017	How to Stay Well	Channel 4	Co-presenter	With Dr Helen Lawal and Dr Phil Kieran
2017	No More Boys and Girls	BBC Two	Presenter	
2018	Contagion! The BBC Four Pandemic	BBC Four	Co-presenter	
2018	'The Big Crash Diet Experiment	BBC One	Presenter	
2018	The One Show	BBC One	Special guest	With presenters Matt Baker and Alex Jones (episode dated 29 May 2018)
2019	Horizon – Cannabis: Miracle Medicine or Dangerous Drug?	BBC Two	Presenter	
2020	Coronavirus: How Clean is Your House?	Channel 4	Co-presenter	With virologist, Dr Lisa Cross
2020	How to Beat…Stress… Fat… Pain… Aging	Channel 4	Co-presenter	With Kate Quilton
2020	Trust Me, I'm a Doctor'	BBC Two	Special reporter	(Episode #9.2)
2021	Steph's Packed Lunch	Channel 4	Resident doctor	with Steph McGovern
2021	'How to Lose Weight Well'	Channel 4	Co-presenter	With Dr Helen Lawal
