= Health Impact Fund =

The Health Impact Fund is a proposed pay-for-performance mechanism that would provide a market-based solution to problems concerning the development and distribution of medicines globally. It would incentivize the research and development of new pharmaceutical products that make substantial reductions in the global burden of disease. The Health Impact Fund is the creation of a team of researchers led by the Yale philosopher Thomas Pogge and the University of Calgary economist Aidan Hollis, and is promoted by the non-profit organization Incentives for Global Health (IGH).

== Motivation ==
In the current system of development and distribution of medicines, millions of people from developing countries die from diseases because the patented medicines they need are unaffordable or because no medicine exists to cure their ailments.Little pharmaceutical research is devoted to diseases specific to the poor. This is largely because it has been difficult for pharmaceutical companies to profit from research and development directed at products needed by the poor. The cost of pharmaceutical research and development is high and unlikely to be recovered from those in poor countries who cannot afford the medicines. Therefore, "the Health Impact Fund would give companies incentives to develop new products targeting the diseases and conditions for which existing systems have failed to produce results, which would especially benefit the poor."

The allocation of pharmaceutical research and development effort is partly a result of the global patent regime established by the Agreement on Trade-Related Aspects of Intellectual Property Rights (TRIPS). Prior to TRIPS, countries were free to not enact intellectual property laws covering medicines, leading to flourishing generic drug industries in countries such as India. Following TRIPS, all World Trade Organization members were required to institute strict, American-style intellectual property rights. As a result, the supply of generic medicines to poor countries has been sharply diminished. According to Nobel Laureate Joseph Stiglitz, the pharmaceutical patent system needs an "alternative" that would "give large rewards for cures or vaccines for diseases like malaria that affect millions."

== Design of the Fund ==
The Health Impact Fund is intended to address the problems with an uncomplemented pharmaceutical patent system. The Health Impact Fund uses market forces to create incentives to develop medicines for typically neglected diseases and to distribute these medicines at low prices all over the world. Pharmaceutical patent-holders would receive financial rewards by opting to register their new medicines, or new uses of existing medicines, with the Fund. By registering, a patent-holder agrees to distribute its medicine globally at cost and to cooperate in measuring the health impact of that medicine. In return, the firm receives an annual reward based on its measurable contribution to reducing the global burden of disease. In order to achieve distribution at cost, the Health Impact Fund could require generic licensing, tendering, or price controls, depending on the nature of the product.

Registrants of new drugs are eligible for reward payments for ten years starting at the date of marketing approval of their product. New uses receive rewards for five years. Following the reward period, registrants agree to allow generic manufacturing of their medicines, in order to prevent price spikes. Registrants retain their rights to control follow-on innovation.

== Assessing the health impact of a registered product ==
When assessing the health impact of a registered product, “the Health Impact Fund would essentially estimate the difference between (1) the actual health status of people who consumed the registered product and (2) the estimated health status of those people, had they not had access to the registered product.”

The standard measure of health impact is the Quality-Adjusted Life Year (QALY). For example, if all registered products were in conjunction estimated to have saved 10 million QALYs, then a registered product that saved 1 million of those QALYs would receive ten percent of the available reward funds for that year. The health impact assessment of a registered product would be conducted for each year of its registration with the Health Impact Fund, and payments would be disbursed annually.

== Funding ==
The Health Impact Fund might be financed by governments, with countries committing a fixed fraction of their gross national income (GNI) to the Health Impact Fund (0.03 percent of a country's GNI is the suggested minimum). Alternatively, the Health Impact Fund might also be funded through an international tax on carbon emissions, say, or on disruptive financial speculations.

== Next step: an innovative pilot ==
As performance measurement is a core component of the Health Impact Fund, it needs to be robust across diverse products, patient demographics, and social and natural environments. Working with leading health care assessment organizations such as The George Institute for International Health, NICE International, the Institut für Qualität und Wirtschaftlichkeit im Gesundheitswesen (IQWiG) and the Institute for Health Metrics and Evaluation, the Health Impact Fund would perform evaluations of the health impact of different products in a variety of countries. Such assessments would go beyond pre-approval clinical trials, using epidemiological data from actual usage, practical trials, physician surveys, and patient demographics, as modifiers to the core health impact assessment. IGH aims to pilot the proposed Health Impact Fund mechanism by rewarding a pharmaceutical manufacturer on the basis of measured health impact in a region. This will allow the pay-for-performance approach to be field-tested and refined before it is implemented on a wider scale.

== Relationship to other proposals ==
The Health Impact Fund can be seen as a development of Advanced Market Commitment, which also incentivizes new research while ensuring access at low prices. Compared to the Advanced Market Commitment, the Health Impact Fund is comprehensive by offering to reward any new drug or vaccine. Moreover, the Health Impact Fund would not guarantee a market: how much an innovator would earn from its registered products would depend on how much health impact it achieves with them as well as on the reward rate, which in turn depends on the aggregate health gains achieved by all registered products. A third way of viewing it is as a supplementary global drug insurance system, in which the copayment made by consumers is equal to the cost of production.

The Health Impact Fund staff has prepared a memo setting out their view of the intellectual history of the Health Impact Fund.

== Reception ==
=== Criticisms ===
When the Health Impact Fund was proposed in 2008, it attracted criticism from Professor Brook Baker and Knowledge Ecology International for not requiring open licensing of registered drugs. Instead, it allowed drug manufacturers to maintain a monopoly, subject to regulated prices. The proponents modified the proposal in response, suggesting greater flexibility about this aspect of the Health Impact Fund.

Brita Pekarsky (2010) has argued that the cost of the Health Impact Fund may be too high, if it is taking money away from other valuable development or health related activities. She does not, however, identify what opportunity cost is relevant.

Paul Grootendorst (2009) states that the primary challenge for the Health Impact Fund is the difficulty of measuring health impact accurately. He notes particularly the problems of trying to attribute health impact to drugs that have long latency periods in their effectiveness (such as vaccines and anti-hypertensives); the problems of consistency across different therapeutic areas; and the technical difficulty of disentangling the effect of the drug from confounding factors.

Jorn Sonderholm (2009) argues that there is a lack of evidence that patents create a barrier to access, so that the Health Impact Fund may fail to address a real problem. This is due to a misunderstanding about the nature of the Health Impact Fund, which addresses the problem that there are insufficient incentives to invest in vaccines and treatments for diseases that lack effective market demand.

Sakiko Fukuda-Parr and Proochista Ariana (2011) criticized the Health Impact Fund on a variety of grounds, including its approach to the distribution of benefits and costs, the impact on generic competition and the role of the Health Impact Fund in strategic negotiations on intellectual property rights, leading to a response from IGH.

Afschin Gandjour and Nadja Chernyak state that the Health Impact Fund does not have a rational basis for the underlying willingness to pay per health gain. They propose a system in which the reward for innovative drugs would be based on "willingness to pay." Since willingness to pay is quite low in low-income countries, their approach requires altruistic motivation by high-income countries to address existing global health inequities.

=== Support ===
The Health Impact Fund is supported by a distinguished advisory board.

- Kenneth J. Arrow, (deceased in 2017) Professor of Economics and Operations Research, Stanford University; Nobel Prize Winner in Economics
- Noam Chomsky, Institute Professor, Department of Linguistics & Philosophy, MIT
- Robert Gallo, director of the Institute of Human Virology at the University of Maryland School of Medicine, co-discoverer of the human immunodeficiency virus
- John J. DeGioia, President of Georgetown University
- Professor David Haslam, Chairman of the National Institute for Health and Care Excellence (NICE)
- Ruth Faden, Director of the Berman Institute of Bioethics, Johns Hopkins University
- Paul Farmer, Chair of the Department of Global Health and Social Medicine at Harvard Medical School; Co-founder, Partners in Health
- Paul Martin, twenty-first Prime Minister of Canada
- Christopher Murray, Institute Director, Institute for Health Metrics and Evaluation (IHME)
- Gustav Nossal, Research Biologist, Australian of the Year in 2000.
- Baroness Onora O'Neill, Member of the UK House of Lords; former President of the British Academy
- James Orbinski, Director of Dahdaleh Institute for Global Health Research, York University; Former International President of MSF
- Sir Michael Rawlins, former Chairman of the UK National Institute of Health & Clinical Excellence (NICE)
- Jan Rosier, Elan Professor of Biotech Business at University College Dublin; Former Vice President of Janssen Drug Development
- Karin Roth, German Parliament member, speaker of the SPD-faction in the Subcommittee on Health in Developing Countries
- Amartya Sen, Professor of Economics and Philosophy, Harvard University; Nobel Prize Winner in Economics
- Peter Singer, Ira W. DeCamp Professor of Bioethics, Princeton University
- Judith Whitworth, Chair of WHO's Global Advisory Committee on Health Research
- Heidemarie Wieczorek-Zeul, Member of the German Bundestag for Wiesbaden; German Federal Minister for Economic Cooperation and Development, 1998 to 2009
- Richard Wilder, Associate General Counsel of the Bill & Melinda Gates Foundation
- Jim Yong Kim, President of Dartmouth College; Co-founder, Partners in Health was on the advisory board but resigned following his appointment as President of the World Bank in 2012.

In June 2010, the Social Democratic Party of Germany officially endorsed the Health Impact Fund and called on the German government to actively support a Health Impact Fund pilot.

The World Health Organization Expert Working Group on Research and Development Financing (related to Public health, innovation and intellectual property) described the Health Impact Fund as one of a few "promising" proposals deserving further examination. A new WHO Consultative Expert Working Group (CEWG) has noted that the Health Impact Fund proposal would benefit from a pilot to demonstrate feasibility.

Carl Nathan (2009) suggests that the Health Impact Fund could help to overcome obstacles to the control of tuberculosis such as development and distribution of vaccines and medicines to the poor.

John J. DeGioia, President of Georgetown University, has complimented the Health Impact Fund for bringing moral imperatives and pragmatic market principles together. He states, "that this is the beauty of the Health Impact Fund . . . it translates idealism into innovation."

Christian Barry and Matt Peterson favour the Health Impact Fund as a mechanism for providing innovators with incentives to develop new medicines that have significant health impacts rather than significant sales impacts.

James Orbinski states that the Health Impact Fund is an innovative policy proposal that "should be implemented."
