= Hope in Hell (book) =

2006 book by Dan Bortolotti

- Author: Dan Bortolotti
- Language: English
- Subject: Médecins Sans Frontières
- Genre: Non-fiction
- Publisher: Firefly Books
- Pages: 304
- ISBN: 1-55297-865-6

Hope in Hell: Inside the World of Doctors Without Borders is a 2006 book by Dan Bortolotti about Médecins Sans Frontières.

== Summary ==
The book covers the activities undertaken by Médecins Sans Frontières (MSF) such as building hospitals and navigating conflict zones. Content covers the complexities of dealing with bureaucracies, epidemics, abductions and killings.

Bortolotti is critical of the mainstream media for its simplistic and heroic portrayal of MSF staff.

== Style ==
The book is written in the style of a report.

== Reception ==
Jenniger Prittie, writing for Quill and Quire described it as "gripping" and "clear" and noted that it would be of interest to a wide range of readers. Prittie also praised the book for not glorifying the international staff of MSF and for discussing the struggles they face integrating back into their home countries.

Amanda Walters Scarborough, writing in The Lancet, described the book as a "comprehensive picture of the essence of volunteerism."

Benjamin Bates of Ohio University is critical of Bortolotti for writing a simple and heroic caricature of MSF and its staff and accuses the author of "disaster pornography". Bates also criticizes the story for centering white, middle-class men and for missing the perspectives of MSF's patients.

Isabelle Leblac, writing in the Canadian Medical Association Journal, criticizes the lack of reporting on the activities of the local staff.

== See also ==
- Six Months in Sudan
- An Imperfect Offering
