= Bharati Defence and Infrastructure Limited =

Indian shipbuilding company

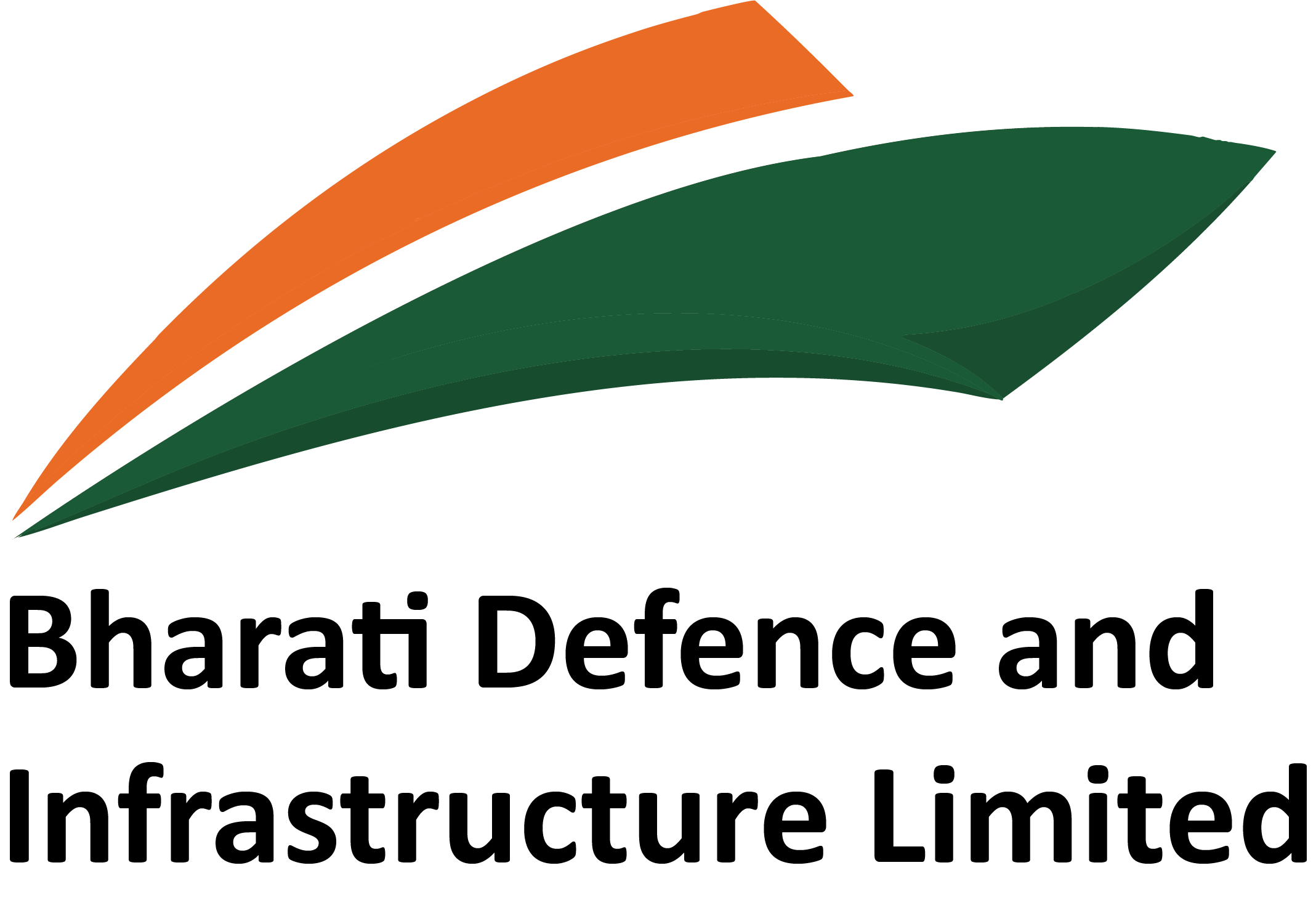
- Type: Public
- Traded as: BSE: 532609; NSE: BHARTISHIP
- Industry: Shipbuilding, Defence industry
- Founded: 1976
- Founder: Prakash C. Kapoor; Vijay Kumar
- Headquarters: Mumbai, India
- Key people: Sandeep Agarwal, MD; Satyanarayan Parashar, Rahul MIttal
- Services: Ship design Ship building Ship repair
- Revenue: ₹13.52 billion (US$140 million) (2010)
- Net income: ▲₹1.38 billion (US$14 million) (2009-10)
- Subsidiaries: Tebma Shipyard Private Limited; Pinky Shipyard Private Limited
- Website: bdil.co.in

Bharati Defence and Infrastructure Limited (formerly Bharati Shipyard Limited) is one of the largest shipbuilding companies in India.

== History ==
Bharati Shipyard Limited (BSL) was founded in 1976 by Prakash C. Kapoor and Vijay Kumar, graduates of the Ocean Engineering & Naval Architecture program at Indian Institute of Technology, Kharagpur, as well as colleagues at Mazagon Dock Limited. The company went public in December 2004, with listings on the Bombay Stock Exchange and the National Stock Exchange.

In 2005, BSL subsequently acquired a 51% stake in privately held Pinky Shipyard Private Limited based in Goa. In 2009, BSL won majority control of Great Offshore Limited in a bidding war with ABG Shipyard Limited. In November 2010, BSL acquired a majority stake in South India based Tebma Shipyards for INR 757.5 Million.

BSL bought the entire equipment and infrastructure of the iconic British shipyard, Swan Hunter, in 2007, after it declared bankruptcy.

In 2015, the shipyard group found itself heavily indebted and in severe financial difficulties. In developing a restructuring plan, the Edelweiss Asset Reconstruction Company acquired 70 per cent of the debt from the lending banks and, as an indication of a desire to concentrate on defence business, the company's name was changed in 2015 to Bharati Defence and Infrastructure Limited. In January 2019 the National Company Law Tribunal declared the restructuring proposals from Edelweiss to be unacceptable and ordered the company's liquidation.

== Facilities ==
Bharati Shipyard is headquartered in Mumbai. It operates shipbuilding facilities in Ratnagiri, Dabhol, Mangalore and Kolkata. It has structural quality assurance facilities at Ghodbunder Road in Thane district. Its subsidiary, Pinky Shipyard, has shipbuilding facilities in Goa. Its subsidiary, Tebma Shipyard, has shipbuilding facilities in Karnataka, Kerala and Tamil Nadu.

BSL's Dabhol yard is one of the largest in India, spread over 300 acres. In 2007, BSL bought the entire equipment and infrastructure, of bankrupt British shipyard Swan Hunter. The infrastructure, including the iconic cranes and the floating dock, was dismantled, transported to India, and installed at BSL's Dabhol yard.

== Products ==
Bharati Shipyard builds jackup rigs, platform supply vessels, tractor and ASD tugs, dredgers, deep sea fishing vessels, bulk carriers, cargo and container ships, tankers and roll-on/roll-off vessels.

In March 2009, it was awarded a ₹2.8 billion (US$29 million) contract to build 15 high-speed interceptors for the Indian Coast Guard.

== Financial Distress and Insolvency Proceedings ==
=== NCLT liquidation order (January 2019) ===
In January 2019, the Mumbai Bench of the National Company Law Tribunal (NCLT) rejected the resolution plan submitted by Edelweiss ARC under Section 31(2) of the Insolvency and Bankruptcy Code, 2016, on the grounds that the plan was not practical or viable. The NCLT noted that the plan contained significant uncertainties and speculative elements, and observed that the public shareholding in the company would have been reduced to approximately 2 per cent from a then-prevailing level of approximately 60 per cent. The Tribunal also noted that the plan sought to build only 9 of the 24 defence vessels on order (for the Indian Navy and the Indian Coast Guard) while cancelling the balance without liability to pay penalties.

The NCLT directed that the company be liquidated under Regulation 32(b) and (e) of the IBBI (Liquidation Process) Regulations, 2016. Mr. Vijay Kumar V. Iyer of Deloitte Touche Tohmatsu India LLP was appointed as Liquidator.

=== NCLAT confirmation and going concern classification (May 2019) ===
The NCLT's liquidation order was challenged before the National Company Law Appellate Tribunal (NCLAT). The NCLAT upheld the NCLT's decision but directed that the company be treated as a going concern during the liquidation process, citing the national importance of the company's product line- in particular its defence vessel contracts with the Ministry of Defence, the Indian Coast Guard, and the Indian Customs- and the significant advances already paid by various government departments. The Tribunal noted that more than 850 employees were on the company's rolls.

=== Liquidation process (2019–2024) ===
The Liquidator sought bids for the company on a going-concern consolidated basis. In February 2021, Deloitte Touche Tohmatsu India LLP set a reserve price of ₹615 crore for the sale of the company as a going concern. The liquidation process extended over several years, during which the Liquidator obtained multiple extensions from the NCLT. The NCLT recorded multiple orders in relation to the liquidation proceedings between 2019 and 2024, including orders on asset sales and other matters.

== Acquisition and Revival (January 2025) ==
Following the prolonged liquidation process, Bharati Defence and Infrastructure Limited was acquired as a going concern under the leadership of Sandeep Omprakash Agarwal pursuant to approval granted by the Hon'ble National Company Law Tribunal, Mumbai Bench. The closure of liquidation proceedings was effected in January 2025.

According to the company's official communications, the revival is intended to reset the company's governance and operational foundation, with the company's activities aligned with the Government of India's Atmanirbhar Bharat and Make in India policy initiatives. The company states its aspiration to contribute to indigenous defence manufacturing, shipbuilding, and advanced deep tech systems.
