= Dignitas International =

Organization

- Founded: 2004
- Founder: James Orbinski, M.D., James Fraser
- Type: Medical and Research Organization
- Location: Toronto, Ontario, Canada
- Region served: Malawi, Northern Canada
- Website: DignitasInternational.org

Dignitas International is a medical and research organization, which is dedicated to improving access to lifesaving treatment and care for HIV, TB and related diseases in resource-limited settings. Dignitas was founded by James Orbinski and James Fraser, both formerly with Médecins Sans Frontières (MSF/Doctors Without Borders), with an underlying belief in human dignity.

Dignitas works in partnership with patients, health workers, researchers and policymakers to tackle the barriers to health care in resource-limited communities. Dignitas emphasizes a balance between frontline care and research in order to treat patients, strengthen health systems and shape health policy and practice. Community-based care enables communities to overcome the lack of health care workers in regions overwhelmed by the AIDS pandemic. Dignitas's work is based on the notion that by creating links between hospitals, health centres and communities, patients will have better access to with life-extending antiretroviral (ARV) therapies. Dignitas tries to develop and refine community-based approaches for HIV-related treatment and prevention so that the lessons learned can be disseminated to other parts of the developing world overwhelmed by AIDS.

Dignitas also conducts research in collaboration with the University of Toronto and other partners to monitor and evaluate effectiveness, improve programming, and inform the work of other stakeholders.

Since October 2004, Dignitas has been working particularly in Zomba District, Malawi in partnership with the Malawi Ministry of Health, providing antiretroviral (ARV) therapy to thousands of children and adults in the country.

Dignitas advocated for HIV testing and against discrimination of sex workers.

In 2019 the chair of the board of directors announced the Dignitas was winding down.
