= Médecins Sans Frontières =

Humanitarian medical care organisation

- Founded: 22 December 1971; 54 years ago
- Founded at: Paris, France
- Type: International non-governmental organisation
- Purpose: Humanitarian aid
- Headquarters: Global: Geneva Centres: Amsterdam (OCA); Barcelona (OCBA); Brussels (OCB); Geneva (OCG); Paris (OCP); Ubuntu; West and Central Africa (WaCA)
- Region served: Worldwide
- International President: Dr Javid Abdelmoneim
- Secretary General: Laura Leyser
- Main organ: International General Assembly
- Revenue: €2.6 billion (2025)
- Expenses: €2.5 billion (2025)
- Employees: 65,000 (2025)
- Website: www.msf.org

Introduction to Médecins Sans Frontières (Doctors Without Borders)

Médecins Sans Frontières (MSF; pronounced [medsɛ̃ sɑ̃ fʁɔ̃tjɛʁ]), French for Doctors Without Borders, is a charity that provides humanitarian medical care. It is a non-governmental organisation (NGO) of French origin known for its projects in conflict zones and in countries affected by endemic diseases. The organisation provides care for diabetes, drug-resistant infections, HIV/AIDS, hepatitis C, tropical and neglected diseases, tuberculosis, vaccines and COVID-19. In 2024, the charity was active in more than 75 countries with over 67,000 personnel; mostly local doctors, nurses and other medical professionals, logistical experts, water and sanitation engineers, and administrators. Private donors provide about 98% of the organisation's funding, giving MSF an annual income of approximately EUR 2.36 billion.

MSF was founded in 1971, in the aftermath of the Biafran famine of the Nigerian Civil War, by a small group of French doctors and journalists who sought to expand accessibility to medical care across national boundaries and irrespective of race, religion, creed or political affiliation. MSF's principles and operational guidelines are highlighted in its Charter, the Chantilly Principles, and the later La Mancha Agreement. Governance is addressed in Section 2 of the Rules portion of this final document. MSF has an associative structure where operational decisions are made, independently, by the seven operational centres (Amsterdam, Barcelona-Athens, Brussels, Geneva, Paris, Ubuntu [Nairobi], and West and Central Africa [with a headquarters office in Abidjan, Ivory Coast]). Common policies on core issues are coordinated by the International Board, in which each of the 26 sections (national offices) is represented. The International Board meets in Geneva, Switzerland, where the International Office, which coordinates international activities common to the operational centres, is based.

MSF has general consultative status with the United Nations Economic and Social Council. It received the 1999 Nobel Peace Prize in recognition of its members' continued efforts to provide medical care in acute crises, as well as raising international awareness of potential humanitarian disasters. James Orbinski, who was the president of the organisation at the time, accepted the prize on behalf of MSF. Prior to this, MSF also received the 1996 Seoul Peace Prize.

== History ==
=== 1967 to 1970 – Biafra ===
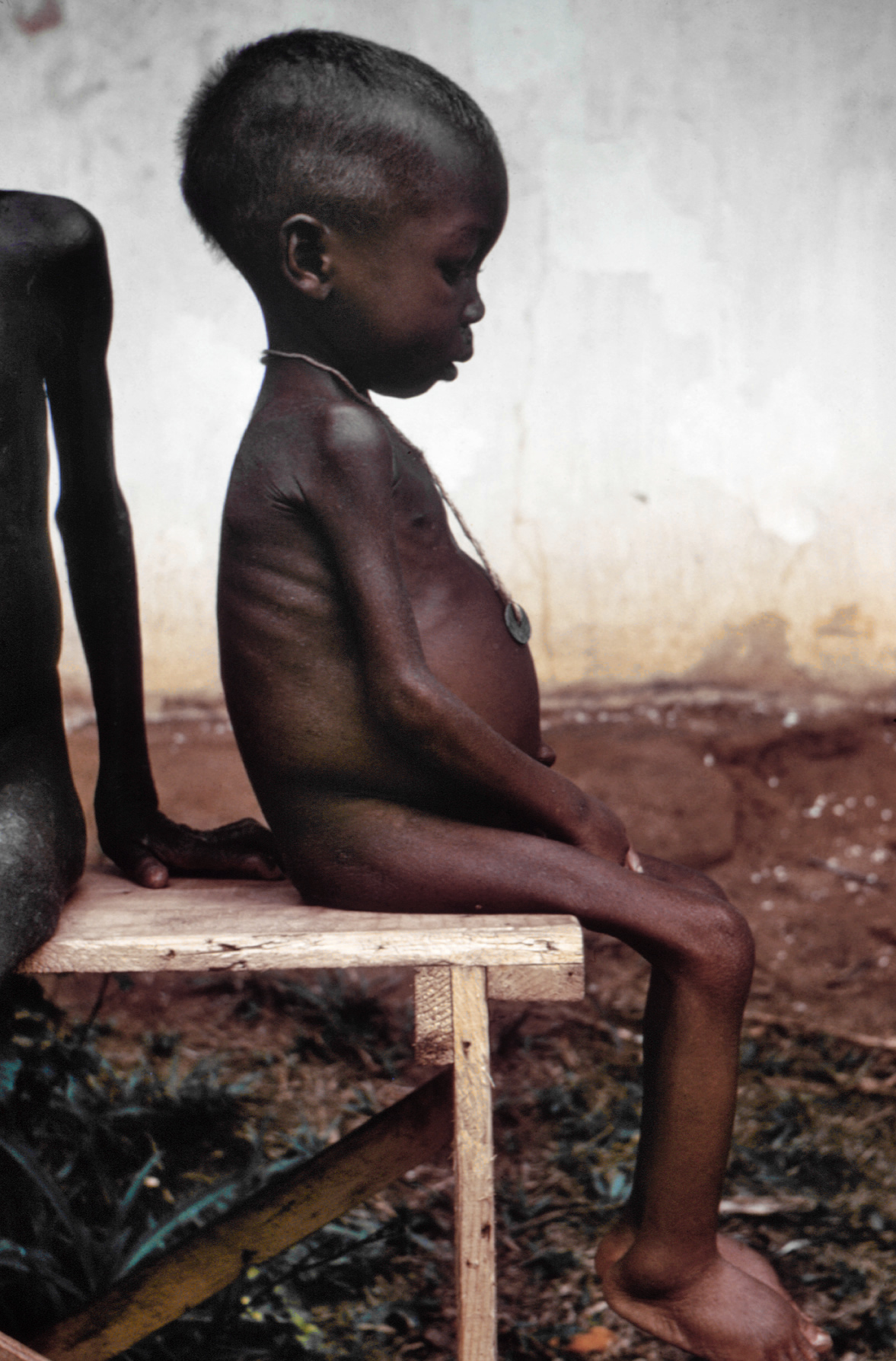
A child with kwashiorkor during the Nigerian Civil War

During the Nigerian Civil War of 1967 to 1970, the Nigerian military formed a blockade around the nation's newly independent south-eastern region, Biafra. At this time, France was one of the few major countries supportive of the Biafrans (the United Kingdom, the Soviet Union and the United States sided with the Nigerian government), and the conditions within the blockade were unknown to the world. A number of French doctors volunteered with the French Red Cross to work in hospitals and feeding centers in besieged Biafra. One of the co-founders of the organisation was Bernard Kouchner, who later had a career in French politics, rising to the position of Minister of Foreign and European Affairs, which he held 2007–2010.

After entering the country, the volunteers, in addition to Biafran health workers and hospitals, were subjected to attacks by the Nigerian Armed Forces, and witnessed civilians being murdered and starved by the blockading forces. The doctors publicly criticised the Nigerian government and the Red Cross for their seemingly complicit behaviour. These doctors concluded that a new aid organisation was needed that would ignore political/religious boundaries and prioritise the welfare of survivors. Apart from Nigeria, MSF exists in several African countries including Benin, Zambia, Uganda, Kenya, South Africa, Rwanda, Sudan, Sierra Leone, and others.

=== 1971 establishment ===
The Groupe d'intervention médicale et chirurgicale en urgence ("Emergency Medical and Surgical Intervention Group") was formed in 1971 by French doctors who had worked in Biafra, to provide aid and to emphasize the importance of survivors' rights. At the same time, Raymond Borel, the editor of the French medical journal TONUS, had started a group called Secours Médical Français ("French Medical Relief") in response to the 1970 Bhola cyclone, which killed at least 625,000 in East Pakistan (now Bangladesh). Borel had intended to recruit doctors to provide aid to survivors of natural disasters. On 22 December 1971, the two groups of colleagues merged to form Médecins Sans Frontières (Doctors Without Borders).

MSF's first mission was to the Nicaraguan capital, Managua, where a 1972 earthquake had destroyed most of the city and killed between 10,000 and 30,000 people. The organisation, today known for its quick response in an emergency, arrived three days after the Red Cross had set up a relief mission. On 18 and 19 September 1974, Hurricane Fifi caused major flooding in Honduras and killed thousands of people (estimates vary), and MSF set up its first long-term medical relief mission.

Between 1975 and 1979, after South Vietnam had fallen to North Vietnam, millions of Cambodians immigrated to Thailand to avoid the Khmer Rouge. In response, MSF set up its first refugee camp missions in Thailand. When Vietnam withdrew from Cambodia in 1989, MSF started long-term relief missions to help survivors of the mass killings and reconstruct the country's health care system. Although its missions to Thailand to help victims of war in Southeast Asia could arguably be seen as its first wartime mission, MSF saw its first mission to a true war zone, including exposure to hostile fire, in 1976. MSF spent nine years (1976–1984) assisting surgeries in the hospitals of various cities in Lebanon, during the Lebanese Civil War, and established a reputation for its neutrality and willingness to work under fire. Throughout the war, MSF helped both Christian and Muslim soldiers alike, helping whichever group required the most medical aid at the time. In 1984, as the situation in Lebanon deteriorated further and security for aid groups was minimised, MSF withdrew its volunteers.

==== Original founders ====
- Jacques Bérès
- Philippe Bernier
- Raymond Borel
- Jean Cabrol
- Marcel Delcourt
- Xavier Emmanuelli
- Pascal Grellety Bosviel
- Gérard Illiouz
- Bernard Kouchner
- Gérard Pigeon
- Vladan Radoman
- Max Récamier
- Louis Schittly

=== 1970s ===
Claude Malhuret was elected as the new president of Médecins Sans Frontières in 1977, and soon after debates began over the future of the organisation. In particular, the concept of témoignage ("witnessing"), which refers to speaking out about the suffering that one sees as opposed to remaining silent, was being opposed or played down by Malhuret and his supporters. Malhuret thought MSF should avoid criticism of the governments of countries in which they were working, while Kouchner believed that documenting and broadcasting the suffering in a country was the most effective way to solve a problem.

In 1979, after four years of refugee movement from South Vietnam and the surrounding countries by foot and by boat, French intellectuals made an appeal in Le Monde for "A Boat for Vietnam", a project intended to provide medical aid to the refugees. Although the project did not receive support from the majority of MSF, some, including later Minister Bernard Kouchner, chartered a ship called L'Île de Lumière ("The Island of Light"), and, along with doctors, journalists and photographers, sailed to the South China Sea and provided some medical aid to the boat people. The splinter organisation that undertook this, Médecins du Monde, later developed the idea of humanitarian intervention as a duty, in particular on the part of Western nations such as France. In 2007 MSF clarified that for nearly 30 years MSF and Kouchner have had public disagreements on such issues as the right to intervene and the use of armed force for humanitarian reasons. Kouchner is in favour of the latter, whereas MSF stands up for an impartial humanitarian action, independent from all political, economic and religious powers.

=== 1980s ===
In 1982, Malhuret and Rony Brauman (who became the organisation's president in 1982) brought increased financial independence to MSF by introducing fundraising-by-mail to better collect donations. The 1980s also saw the establishment of the other operational sections from MSF-France (1971): MSF-Belgium (1980), MSF-Switzerland (1981), MSF-Holland (1984), and MSF-Spain (1986). MSF-Luxembourg was the first support section, created in 1986. The early 1990s saw the establishment of the majority of the support sections: MSF-Greece (1990), MSF-USA (1990), MSF-Canada (1991), MSF-Japan (1992), MSF-UK (1993), MSF-Italy (1993), MSF-Australia (1994), as well as Germany, Austria, Denmark, Sweden, Norway, and Hong Kong (MSF-UAE was formed later). Malhuret and Brauman were instrumental in professionalising MSF. In December 1979, after the Soviet army had invaded Afghanistan, field missions were immediately set up to provide medical aid to the mujahideen, and in February 1980, MSF publicly denounced the Khmer Rouge. During the 1983–1985 famine in Ethiopia, MSF set up nutrition programmes in the country in 1984, but was expelled in 1985 after denouncing the abuse of international aid and the forced resettlements. MSF's explicit attacks on the Ethiopian government led to other NGOs criticizing their abandonment of their supposed neutrality and contributed to a series of debates in France around humanitarian ethics. The group also set up equipment to produce clean drinking water for the population of San Salvador, capital of El Salvador, after the 10 October 1986 earthquake that struck the city.

=== 1990s ===
In 1990, MSF first entered Liberia to help civilians and refugees affected by the Liberian Civil War. Constant fighting throughout the 1990s and the Second Liberian Civil War have kept MSF volunteers actively providing nutrition, basic health care, and mass vaccinations, and speaking out against attacks on hospitals and feeding stations, especially in Monrovia.

Field missions were set up to provide relief to Kurdish refugees who had survived the al-Anfal Campaign, for which evidence of atrocities was being collected in 1991. 1991 also saw the beginning of the civil war in Somalia, during which MSF set up field missions in 1992 alongside a UN peacekeeping mission. Although the UN had aborted operations by 1993, MSF representatives continued with their relief work, running clinics and hospitals for civilians.

MSF first began work in Srebrenica (in Bosnia and Herzegovina) as part of a UN convoy in 1993, one year after the Bosnian War had begun. The city had become surrounded by the Bosnian Serb Army and, containing about 60,000 Bosniaks, had become an enclave guarded by a United Nations Protection Force. MSF was the only organisation providing medical care to the surrounded civilians, and as such, did not denounce the genocide for fear of being expelled from the country (it did, however, denounce the lack of access for other organisations). MSF was forced to leave the area in 1995 when the Bosnian Serb Army captured the town. 40,000 Bosniak civilian inhabitants were deported, and approximately 7,000 were killed in mass executions.

==== Rwandan genocide ====
When the genocide in Rwanda began in April 1994, some delegates of MSF working in the country were incorporated into the International Committee of the Red Cross (ICRC) medical team for protection. Both groups succeeded in keeping all main hospitals in Rwanda's capital Kigali operational throughout the main period of the genocide. MSF, together with several other aid organisations, had to leave the country in 1995, although many MSF and ICRC volunteers worked together under the ICRC's rules of engagement, which held that neutrality was of the utmost importance. These events led to a debate within the organisation about the concept of balancing neutrality of humanitarian aid workers against their witnessing role. As a result of its Rwanda mission, the position of MSF with respect to neutrality moved closer to that of the ICRC, a remarkable development in the light of the origin of the organisation.

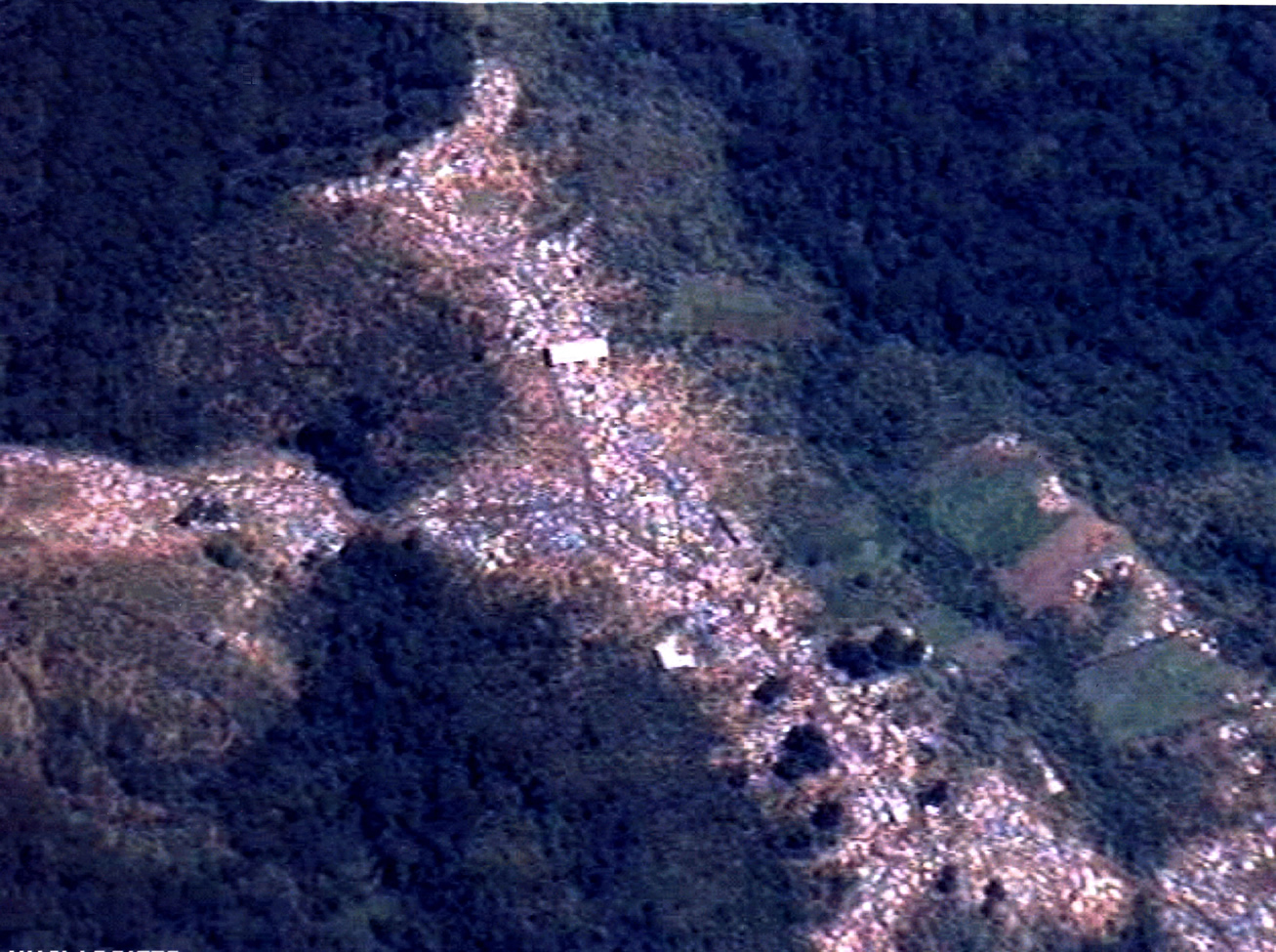
Aerial photograph of a Mihanda, Zaire refugee camp in 1996. Pictured are 500+ tents set up in the Mitumba Mountains.

The ICRC lost 56 and MSF lost almost one hundred of their respective local staff in Rwanda, and MSF-France, which had chosen to evacuate its team from the country (the local staff were forced to stay), denounced the murders and demanded that a French military intervention stop the genocide. MSF-France introduced the slogan "One cannot stop a genocide with doctors" to the media, and the controversial Opération Turquoise followed less than one month later. This intervention directly or indirectly resulted in movements of hundreds of thousands of Rwandan refugees to Zaire and Tanzania in what became known as the Great Lakes refugee crisis, and subsequent cholera epidemics, starvation and more mass killings in the large groups of civilians. MSF-France returned to the area and provided medical aid to refugees in Goma.

At the time of the genocide, competition between the medical efforts of MSF, the ICRC, and other aid groups had reached an all-time high, but the conditions in Rwanda prompted a drastic change in the way humanitarian organisations approached aid missions. The Code of Conduct for the International Red Cross and Red Crescent Movement and NGOs in Disaster Relief Programmes was created by the ICRC in 1994 to provide a framework for humanitarian missions and MSF is a signatory of this code. The code advocates the provision of humanitarian aid only, and groups are urged not to serve any political or religious interest, or be used as a tool for foreign governments. MSF has since still found it necessary to condemn the actions of governments, such as in Chechnya in 1999, but has not demanded another military intervention since then.

=== 2020s ===
==== Accusations of racism ====
More than a thousand staffers accused the charity of white supremacy when they voiced their concerns in a 2020 petition. One staffer from Cameroon detailed her experiences with racism from the group's leaders. Many concerns involved different treatment of expatriate staff from Europe and North America, who are typically white, compared to national staff. In an interview with NPR, the president of the organisation acknowledged Doctors Without Borders was founded in racism and pledged to do better.

==== Snakebite prioritisation in WHO ====
MSF played an important role in the inclusion of snakebite as a WHO Category A Neglected Tropical Disease (NTD) status in, a WHO resolution and development of global strategy to decrease burden of snakebite. MSF highlighted the scarcity of anti-venom in Africa due to stoppage of manufacturing and brought urgency to the scenario and led media advocacy efforts.

==== Access to medicine campaign ====
On June 20, 2024, MSF announced closing down its access-to-medicines campaign focused on enabling access to medicines in resource limited settings. MSF plans to replace the campaign with a new effort that will focus on products, like medicines and vaccines, that MSF needs for its own relief efforts. Several advocates have criticized this move including the Treatment Action Group.

== Activities by location ==
Countries where MSF had missions in 2015

In 1999, the organisation spoke out about the lack of humanitarian support in Kosovo and Chechnya, having set up field missions to help civilians affected by the respective political situations. Although MSF had worked in the Kosovo region since 1993, the onset of the Kosovo War prompted the movement of tens of thousands of refugees, and a decline in suitable living conditions. MSF provided shelter, water and health care to civilians affected by NATO's strategic bombing campaigns.

A serious crisis within MSF erupted in connection with the organisation's work in Kosovo when the Greek section of MSF was expelled from the organisation. The Greek MSF section had gained access to Serbia at the cost of accepting Serb government imposed limits on where it could go and what it could see – terms that the rest of the MSF movement had refused. A non-MSF source alleged that the exclusion of the Greek section happened because its members extended aid to both Albanian and Serbian civilians in Pristina during NATO's bombing. The rift was healed only in 2005 with the re-admission of the Greek section to MSF.

A similar situation was found in Chechnya, whose civilian population was largely forced from their homes into unhealthy conditions and subjected to the violence of the Second Chechen War.

MSF has been working in Haiti since 1991, but since President Jean-Bertrand Aristide was forced from power, the country has seen a large increase in civilian attacks and rape by armed groups. In addition to providing surgical and psychological support in existing hospitals – offering the only free surgery available in Port-au-Prince – field missions have been set up to rebuild water and waste management systems and treat survivors of major flooding caused by Hurricane Jeanne; patients with HIV/AIDS and malaria, both of which are widespread in the country, also receive better treatment and monitoring. As a result of 12 January 2010 Haiti earthquake, reports from Haiti indicated that all three of the organisation's hospitals had been severely damaged; one collapsing completely and the other two having to be abandoned. Following the quake, MSF sent about nine planes loaded with medical equipment and a field hospital to help treat the victims. However, the landings of some of the planes had to be delayed due to the massive number of humanitarian and military flights coming in.

The Kashmir conflict in North India resulted in a more recent MSF intervention (the first field mission was set up in 1999) to help civilians displaced by fighting in Jammu and Kashmir, as well as in Manipur. Psychological support is a major target of missions, but teams have also set up programmes to treat tuberculosis, HIV/AIDS and malaria. Mental health support has been of significant importance for MSF in much of southern Asia since the 2004 Indian Ocean earthquake.

MSF went through a long process of self-examination and discussion in 2005–2006. Many issues were debated, including the treatment of "nationals" as well as "fair employment" and self-criticism.

MSF issued a statement for safe abortion following Dobbs v. Jackson Women's Health Organization.

=== Sub-Saharan Africa ===
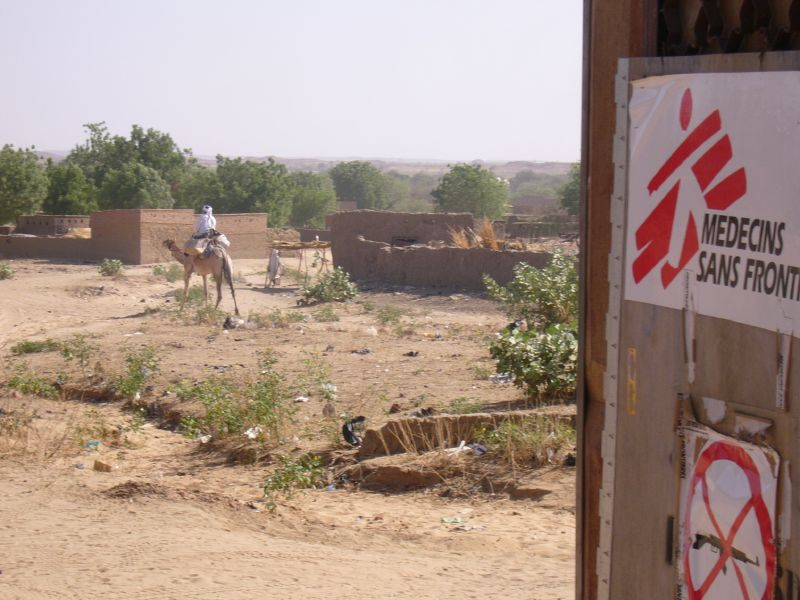
An MSF outpost in Darfur (2005)

MSF has been active in a large number of African countries for decades, sometimes serving as the sole provider of health care, food, and water. Although MSF has consistently attempted to increase media coverage of the situation in Africa to increase international support, long-term field missions are still necessary. Treating and educating the public about HIV/AIDS in sub-Saharan Africa, which sees the most deaths and cases of the disease in the world, is a major task for volunteers. Of the 14.6 million people in need of anti-retroviral treatment the WHO estimated that only 5.25 million people were receiving it in developing countries, and MSF continues to urge governments and companies to increase research and development into HIV/AIDS treatments to decrease cost and increase availability.

==== Sierra Leone ====
In the late 1990s, MSF missions were set up to treat tuberculosis and anaemia in residents of the Aral Sea area, and look after civilians affected by drug-resistant disease, famine, and epidemics of cholera and AIDS. They vaccinated 3 million Nigerians against meningitis during an epidemic in 1996 and denounced the Taliban's neglect of health care for women in 1997. Arguably, the most significant country in which MSF set up field missions in the late 1990s was Sierra Leone, which was involved in a civil war at the time. In 1998, volunteers began assisting in surgeries in Freetown to help with an increasing number of amputees, and collecting statistics on civilians (men, women and children) being attacked by large groups of men claiming to represent ECOMOG. The groups of men were travelling between villages and systematically chopping off one or both of each resident's arms, raping women, gunning down families, razing houses, and forcing survivors to leave the area. Long-term projects following the end of the civil war included psychological support and phantom limb pain management.

==== Sudan ====
Since 1979, MSF has been providing medical humanitarian assistance in Sudan, a nation plagued by starvation and the civil war, prevalent malnutrition and one of the highest maternal mortality rates in the world. In March 2009, it is reported that MSF has employed 4,590 field staff in Sudan tackling issues such as armed conflicts, epidemic diseases, health care and social exclusion. MSF's continued presence and work in Sudan is one of the organisation's largest interventions. MSF provides a range of health care services including nutritional support, reproductive healthcare, kala-azar treatment, counselling services and surgery to the people living in Sudan. Common diseases prevalent in Sudan include tuberculosis, kala-azar also known as visceral leishmaniasis, meningitis, measles, cholera, and malaria.

===== Kala-azar in Sudan =====
Kala-azar, also known as visceral leishmaniasis, has been one of the major health problems in Sudan. After the Comprehensive Peace Agreement between North and Southern Sudan on 9 January 2005, the increase in stability within the region helped further efforts in healthcare delivery. Médecins Sans Frontières tested a combination of sodium stibogluconate and paromomycin, which would reduce treatment duration (from 30 to 17 days) and cost in 2008. In March 2010, MSF set up its first kala-azar treatment centre in Eastern Sudan, providing free treatment for this otherwise deadly disease. If left untreated, there is a fatality rate of 99% within 1–4 months of infection. Since the treatment centre was set up, MSF has cured more than 27,000 kala-azar patients with a success rate of approximately 90–95%. There are plans to open an additional kala-azar treatment centre in Malakal, Southern Sudan, to cope with the overwhelming number of patients that are seeking treatment. MSF has been providing necessary medical supplies to hospitals and training Sudanese health professionals to help them deal with kala-azar. MSF, Sudanese Ministry of Health and other national and international institutions are combining efforts to improve on the treatment and diagnosis of kala-azar. Research on its cures and vaccines are currently being conducted. In December 2010, South Sudan was hit with the worst outbreak of kala-azar in eight years. The number of patients seeking treatment increased eight-fold as compared to the year before.

===== Health care infrastructure in Sudan =====
Sudan's latest civil war began in 1983 and ended in 2005 when a peace agreement was signed between North Sudan and South Sudan. MSF medical teams were active throughout and prior to the civil war, providing emergency medical humanitarian assistance in multiple locations. The situation of poor infrastructure in the South was aggravated by the civil war and resulted in the worsening of the region's appalling health indicators. An estimated 75 percent of people in the nascent nation have no access to basic medical care and 1 in seven women dies during childbirth. Malnutrition and disease outbreaks are perennial concerns as well. In 2011, MSF clinic in Jonglei State, South Sudan, was looted and attacked by raiders. Hundreds, including women and children were killed. Valuable items including medical equipment and drugs were lost during the raid and parts of the MSF facilities were destroyed in a fire. The incident had serious repercussions as MSF is the only primary health care provider in this part of Jonglei State.

==== Democratic Republic of the Congo ====
Although active in the Congo region of Africa since 1985, the First and Second Congo War brought increased violence and instability to the area. MSF has had to evacuate its teams from areas such as around Bunia, in the Ituri district due to extreme violence, but continues to work in other areas to provide food to tens of thousands of displaced civilians, as well as treat survivors of mass rapes and widespread fighting. The treatment and possible vaccination against diseases such as cholera, measles, polio, Marburg fever, sleeping sickness, HIV/AIDS, and bubonic plague is also important to prevent or slow down epidemics.

==== Uganda ====
MSF has been active in Uganda since 1980, and provided relief to civilians during the country's guerrilla war during the Second Obote Period. However, the formation of the Lord's Resistance Army saw the beginning of a long campaign of violence in northern Uganda and southern Sudan. Civilians were subjected to mass killings and rapes, torture, and abductions of children, who would later serve as sex slaves or child soldiers. Faced with more than 1.5 million people displaced from their homes, MSF set up relief programmes in internally displaced person (IDP) camps to provide clean water, food and sanitation. Diseases such as tuberculosis, measles, polio, cholera, ebola, and HIV/AIDS occur in epidemics in the country, and volunteers provide vaccinations (in the cases of measles and polio) and/or treatment to the residents. Mental health is also an important aspect of medical treatment for MSF teams in Uganda since most people refuse to leave the IDP camps for constant fear of being attacked.

==== Ivory Coast ====
MSF first set up a field mission in Côte d'Ivoire in 1990, but ongoing violence and the 2002 division of the country by rebel groups and the government led to several massacres, and MSF teams have even begun to suspect that an ethnic cleansing is occurring. Mass measles vaccinations, tuberculosis treatment and the re-opening of hospitals closed by fighting are projects run by MSF, which is the only group providing aid in much of the country.

MSF has strongly promoted the use of contraception in Africa.

===== West African Ebola outbreak =====
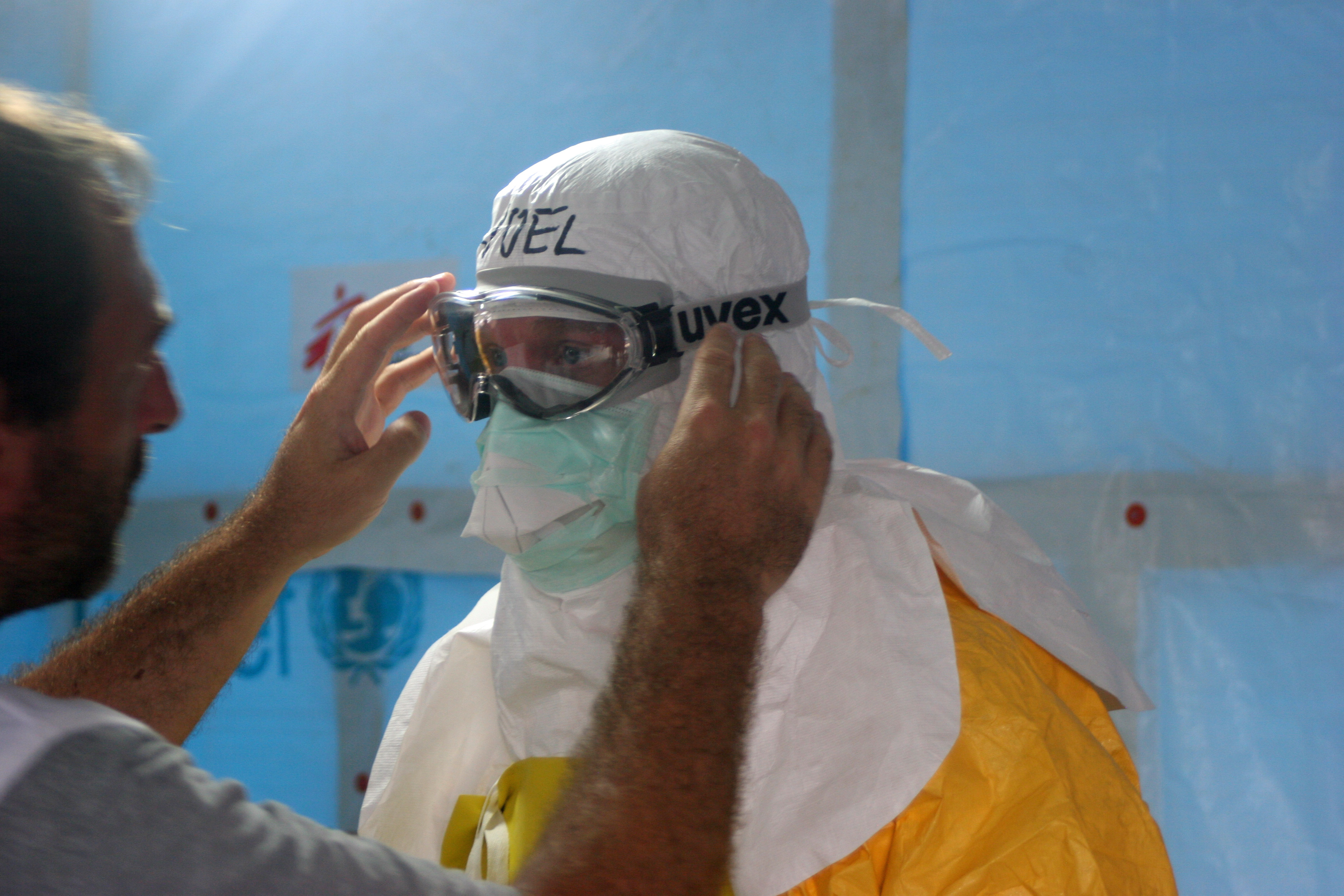
MSF staff member adjusts Dr. Joel Montgomery, Team Lead for CDC's Ebola Response Team in Liberia, goggles before Montgomery enters the Ebola treatment unit (ETU), ELWA 3. MSF operates the ELWA 3 ETU, which opened on 17 August.

During the Ebola outbreak in West Africa in 2014, MSF met serious medical demands largely on its own, after the organisation's early warnings were largely ignored.

===== Burundi =====
MSF-Burundi has aided in attending to casualties suffered in the 2019 Burundi landslides.

=== Asia ===
==== Sri Lanka ====
MSF is involved in Sri Lanka, where a 26-year civil war ended in 2009 and MSF has adapted its activities there to continue its mission. For example, it helps with physical therapy for patients with spinal cord injuries. It conducts counseling sessions, and has set up an "operating theatre for reconstructive orthopaedic surgery and supplied specialist surgeons, anaesthetists and nurses to operate on patients with complicated war-related injuries".

==== Cambodia ====
MSF first provided medical help to civilians and refugees who had escaped to camps along the Thai-Cambodian border in 1979. Due to long decades of war, a proper health care system in the country was severely lacking.

In 1999, Cambodia was hit with a malaria epidemic. The situation of the epidemic was aggravated by a lack of qualified practitioners and poor quality control which led to a market of fake antimalarial drugs. Counterfeit antimalarial drugs were responsible for the deaths of at least 30 people during the epidemic. This has prompted efforts by MSF to set up and fund a malaria outreach project and utilise Village Malaria Workers. MSF also introduced a switching of first-line treatment to a combination therapy (Artesunate and Mefloquine) to combat resistance and fatality of old drugs that were used to treat the disease traditionally.

Cambodia is one of the hardest hit HIV/AIDS countries in Southeast Asia. In 2001, MSF started introducing antiretroviral (ARV) therapy to AIDS patients for free. This therapy prolongs the patients' lives and is a long-term treatment. In 2002, MSF established chronic diseases clinics with the Cambodian Ministry of Health in various provinces to integrate HIV/AIDS treatment, alongside hypertension, diabetes, and arthritis which have high prevalence rate. This aims to reduce facility-related stigma as patients are able to seek treatment in a multi-purpose clinic in contrast to a HIV/AIDS specialised treatment centre.

MSF also provided humanitarian aid in times of natural disaster such as a major flood in 2002 which affected up to 1.47 million people. MSF introduced a community-based tuberculosis programme in 2004 in remote villages, where village volunteers are delegated to facilitate the medication of patients. In partnership with local health authorities and other NGOs, MSF encouraged decentralized clinics and rendered localized treatments to more rural areas from 2006. Since 2007, MSF has extended general health care, counselling, HIV/AIDS and TB treatment to prisons in Phnom Penh via mobile clinics. However, poor sanitation and lack of health care still prevails in most Cambodian prisons as they remain as some of the world's most crowded prisons.

In 2007, MSF worked with the Cambodian Ministry of Health to provide psychosocial and technical support in offering pediatric HIV/AIDS treatment to affected children. MSF also provided medical supplies and staff to help in one of the worst dengue outbreaks in 2007, which had more than 40,000 people hospitalized, killing 407 people, primarily children.

In 2010, Southern and Eastern provinces of Cambodia were hit with a cholera epidemic and MSF responded by providing medical support that was adapted for usage in the country.

Cambodia is one of 22 countries listed by WHO as having a high burden of tuberculosis. WHO estimates that 64% of all Cambodians carry the tuberculosis mycobacterium. Hence, MSF has since shifted its focus away from HIV/AIDS to tuberculosis, handing over most HIV-related programs to local health authorities.

=== Middle East and North Africa ===
==== Libya ====
The 2011 Libyan civil war prompted efforts by MSF to set up a hospital and mental health services to help locals affected by the conflict. The fighting created a backlog of patients that needed surgery. With parts of the country slowly returning to livable, MSF started working with local health personnel to address the needs. The need for psychological counseling increased and MSF set up mental health services to address the fears and stress of people living in tents without water and electricity. As of late 2016, MSF was the only International Aid organisation with actual presence in the country.

MSF was ordered in November 2025 to leave Libya without any apparent explanation.

==== Search and Rescue in the Mediterranean Sea ====
MSF is providing Maritime Search and rescue (SAR) services on the Mediterranean Sea to save the lives of migrants attempting to cross with unseaworthy boats. The Mission started in 2015 after the EU ended its major SAR operation Mare Nostrum, severely diminishing much needed SAR capacities in the Mediterranean. Throughout the mission MSF has operated its own vessels like the Bourbon Argos (2015–2016), Dignity 1 (2015–2016) and VOS Prudence (2016–2017). MSF has also provided medical teams to support other NGOs and their ships like the MOAS Phoenix (2015) or the Aquarius (2017–2018) and Ocean Viking (2019–2020) with SOS Méditerranée and Mediterranea Saving Humans. In August 2017 MSF decided to suspend the activities of the VOS Prudence protesting restrictions and threats by the Libyan "Coast Guard".

In December 2018 MSF and SOS Méditerranée were forced to end operations of the Aquarius, at that date the last remaining vessel supported by MSF. This came after attacks by EU states that stripped the vessel of its registration and produced criminal accusations against MSF. Up to then 80,000 people had been rescued or assisted since the beginning of the mission. Operations resumed with Ocean Viking in July 2019, but the ship was seized in Sicily in July 2020. In May 2021, MSF returned to refugee rescue operations in the Mediterranean with a new vessel, the Geo Barents. Within a month this resulted in the rescue of some 400 people. In December 2024 MSF announced the suspension of further operations of the vessel. During 2023 and 2024, due to bureaucratic blockages by the Italian government, it had spent some 160 days in port. In November 2025, the 20m-long vessel Oyvon entered service as a replacement for the larger Geo Barents, with a crew of 10 MSF activists under the German flag.

==== Yemen ====
MSF is involved in trying to help with the humanitarian crisis caused by the Yemeni Civil War. The organisation operates eleven hospitals and health centres in Yemen and provides support to another 18 hospitals or health centres. According to MSF, since October 2015, four of its hospitals and one ambulance have been destroyed by Saudi-led coalition airstrikes. In August 2016, an airstrike on Abs hospital killed 19 people, including one MSF staff member, and wounded 24.

=== Europe ===
==== The Netherlands ====
In August and September 2022, MSF provided medical care to asylum seekers staying outside the overcrowded migration centre in Ter Apel, the Netherlands.

==== Italy ====
MSF car in Dnipro, Ukraine during war.

MSF has been active in Italy since 1999, providing comprehensive assistance – including humanitarian, medical, psychological, and socio-health support – to migrants, asylum seekers, and refugees across the country. Over the years, its efforts have spanned various initiatives, from aiding migrant arrivals to operating within reception centers and informal settlements in different regions of Italy.

As of Spring 2024, MSF is involved in projects across three key locations in Italy. In Calabria, it delivers medical and psychological aid during migrant arrivals and ensures ongoing care within the region's reception centers. In Ventimiglia, situated on the Italo-French border, MSF operates a mobile clinic specifically catering to migrants passing through the area. Meanwhile, in Palermo, in collaboration with local health authorities, MSF has launched a program to support foreign individuals who have survived torture and other deliberate acts of violence. Moreover, MSF Italy possesses the capability to provide psychological first aid to individuals who have undergone particularly traumatic experiences during their Mediterranean Sea crossings.

== Organisation of activities ==
Before a field mission is established in a country, an MSF team visits the area to determine the nature of the humanitarian emergency, the level of safety in the area and what type of aid is needed (this is called an "exploratory mission").

Medical aid is the main objective of most missions, although some missions help in such areas as water purification and nutrition.

=== Field mission team ===
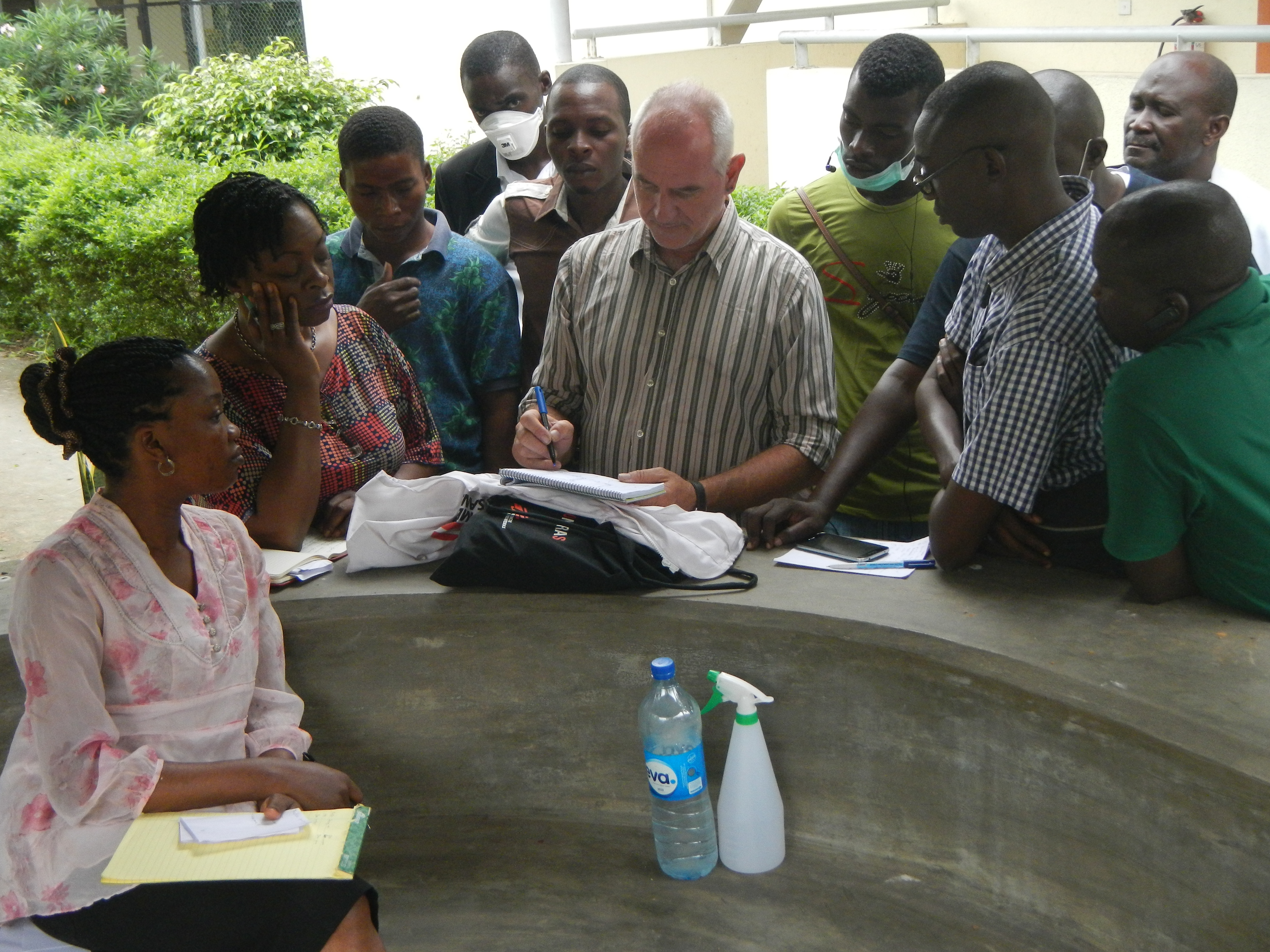
MSF logistician in Nigeria showing plans

A field mission team usually consists of a small number of coordinators to head each component of a field mission, and a "head of mission". The head of mission usually has the most experience in humanitarian situations of the members of the team, and it is their job to deal with the media, national governments and other humanitarian organisations. The head of mission does not necessarily have a medical background.

Medical volunteers include physicians, surgeons, nurses, and various other specialists. In addition to operating the medical and nutrition components of the field mission, these volunteers are sometimes in charge of a group of local medical staff and provide training for them.

=== Medical component ===
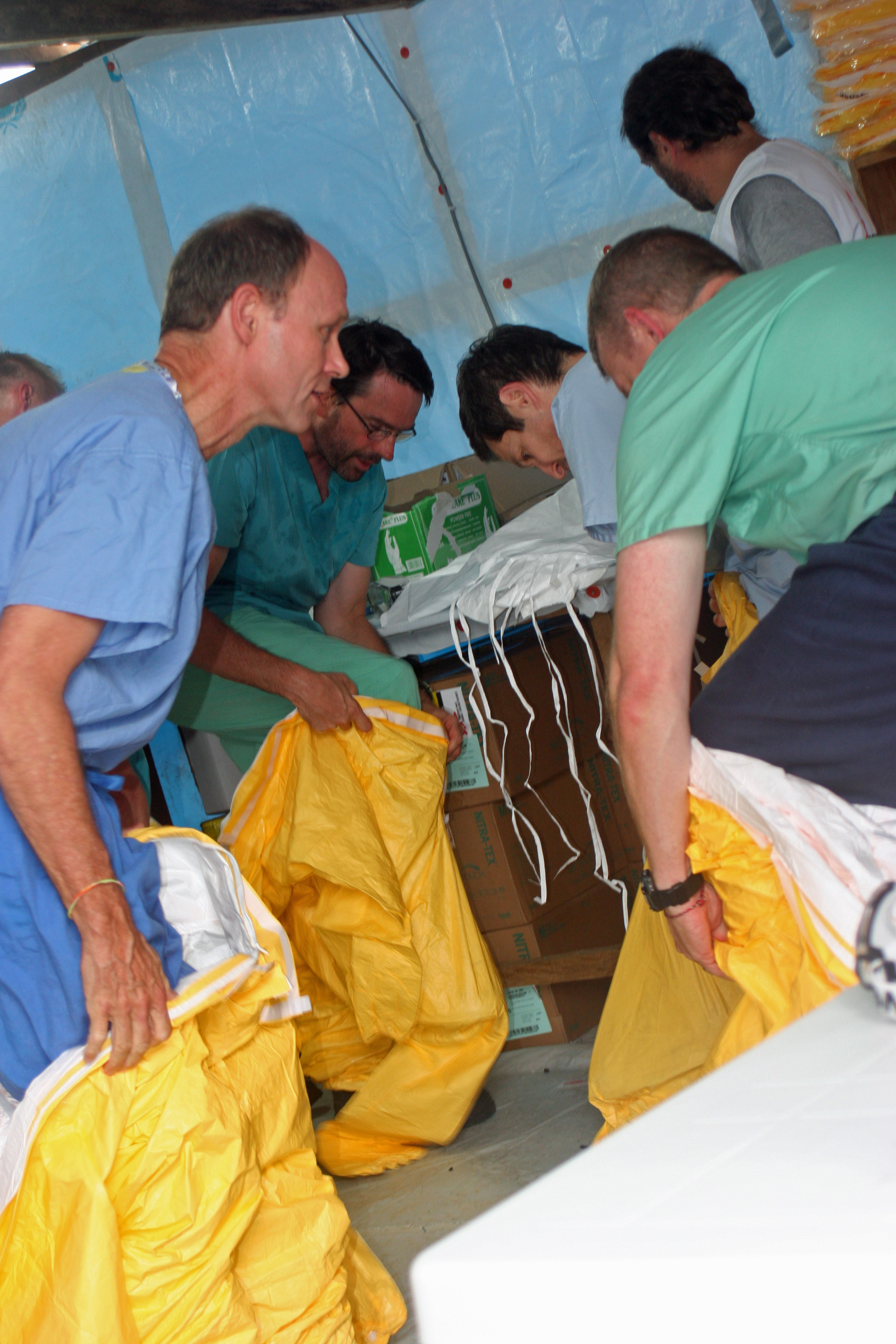
Doctors from MSF and the American CDC put on protective gear before entering an Ebola treatment ward in Liberia, August 2014.

Vaccination campaigns are a major part of the medical care provided during MSF missions. Diseases such as diphtheria, measles, meningitis, tetanus, pertussis, yellow fever, polio, and cholera, all of which are uncommon in developed countries, may be prevented with vaccination. Some of these diseases, such as cholera and measles, spread rapidly in large populations living in close proximity, such as in a refugee camp, and people must be immunised by the hundreds or thousands in a short period of time. For example, in Beira, Mozambique, in 2004, an experimental cholera vaccine was received twice by approximately 50,000 residents in about one month.

An equally important part of the medical care provided during MSF missions is AIDS treatment (with antiretroviral drugs), AIDS testing, and education. MSF is the only source of treatment for many countries in Africa, whose citizens make up the majority of people with HIV and AIDS worldwide. Because antiretroviral drugs (ARVs) are not readily available, MSF usually provides treatment for opportunistic infections and educates the public on how to slow transmission of the disease.

In most countries, MSF increases the capabilities of local hospitals by improving sanitation, providing equipment and drugs, and training local hospital staff. When the local staff is overwhelmed, MSF may open new specialised clinics for treatment of an endemic disease or surgery for victims of war. International staff start these clinics but MSF strives to increase the local staff's ability to run the clinics themselves through training and supervision. In some countries, like Nicaragua, MSF provides public education to increase awareness of reproductive health care and venereal disease.

Since most of the areas that require field missions have been affected by a natural disaster, civil war, or endemic disease, the residents usually require psychological support as well. Although the presence of an MSF medical team may decrease stress somewhat among survivors, often a team of psychologists or psychiatrists help people who have depression, survivors of domestic violence and those with substance use disorder. The doctors may also train local mental health staff. Such cases include Palestinian refugee camps, where long-term displacement and geopolitical circumstances have left many residents without long-term purpose or clear strategies for action. Humanitarian actors, like Médecins Sans Frontières, have sometimes responded by proferring coping skills to residents as a humanitarian aim and outcome. In the late 2000s, Médecins Sans Frontières launched a mental health program in Bourj el-Barajneh camp in Lebanon, providing sexual and reproductive health services, mental health support, and health promotion activities.

=== Nutrition ===
Often in situations where an MSF mission is set up, there is moderate or severe malnutrition as a result of war, drought, or government economic mismanagement. Intentional starvation is also sometimes used during a war as a weapon, and MSF, in addition to providing food, brings awareness to the situation and insists on foreign government intervention. Infectious diseases and diarrhoea, both of which cause weight loss and weakening of a person's body (especially in children), must be treated with medication and proper nutrition to prevent further infections and weight loss. A combination of the above situations, as when a civil war is fought during times of drought and infectious disease outbreaks, can create famine.

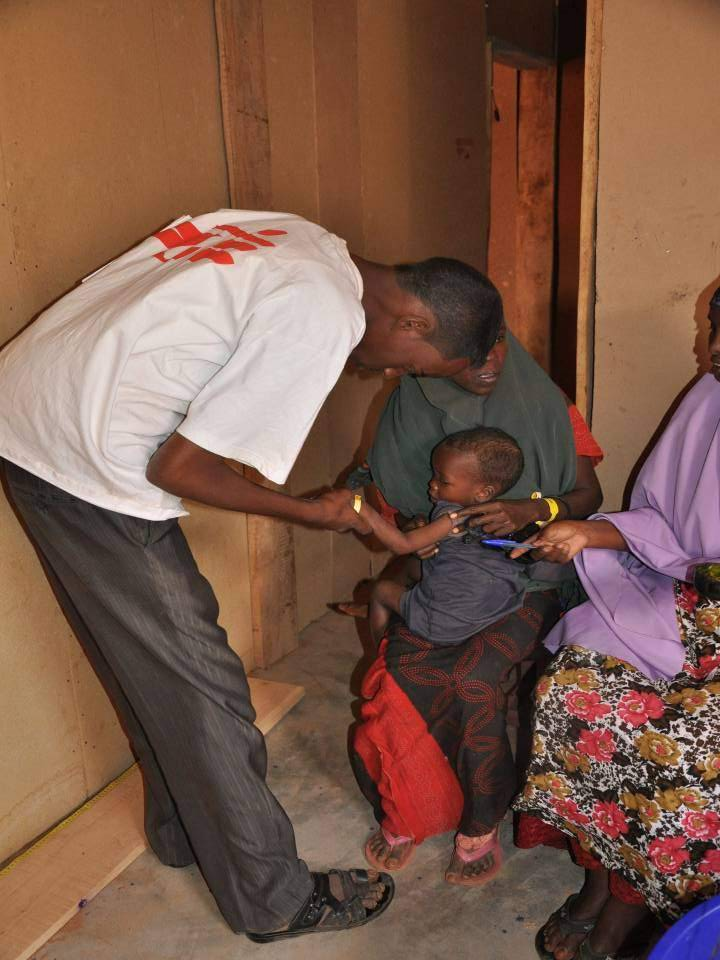
An MSF health worker examines a malnourished child in Ethiopia, July 2011.

In emergency situations where there is a lack of nutritious food, but not to the level of a true famine, protein-energy malnutrition is most common among young children. Marasmus, a form of calorie deficiency, is the most common form of childhood malnutrition and is characterised by severe wasting and often fatal weakening of the immune system. Kwashiorkor, a form of calorie and protein deficiency, is a more serious type of malnutrition in young children, and can negatively affect physical and mental development. Both types of malnutrition can make opportunistic infections fatal. In these situations, MSF sets up Therapeutic Feeding Centres for monitoring the children and any other malnourished individuals.

A Therapeutic Feeding Centre (or Therapeutic Feeding Programme) is designed to treat severe malnutrition through the gradual introduction of a special diet intended to promote weight gain after the individual has been treated for other health problems. The treatment programme is split between two phases:

- Phase 1 lasts for 24 hours and involves basic health care and several small meals of low energy/protein food spaced over the day.
- Phase 2 involves monitoring of the patient and several small meals of high energy/protein food spaced over each day until the individual's weight approaches normal.

MSF uses foods designed specifically for treatment of severe malnutrition. During phase 1, a type of therapeutic milk called F-75 is fed to patients. F-75 is a relatively low energy, low fat/protein milk powder that must be mixed with water and given to patients to prepare their bodies for phase 2. During phase 2, therapeutic milk called F-100, which is higher in energy/fat/protein content than F-75, is given to patients, usually along with a peanut butter mixture called Plumpy'nut. F-100 and Plumpy'nut are designed to quickly provide large amounts of nutrients so that patients can be treated efficiently. Other special food fed to populations in danger of starvation includes enriched flour and porridge, as well as a high protein biscuit called BP5. BP5 is a popular food for treating populations because it can be distributed easily and sent home with individuals, or it can be crushed and mixed with therapeutic milk for specific treatments.

Dehydration, sometimes due to diarrhoea or cholera, may also be present in a population, and MSF set up rehydration centres to combat this. A special solution called Oral Rehydration Solution (ORS), which contains glucose and electrolytes, is given to patients to replace fluids lost. Antibiotics are also sometimes given to individuals with diarrhoea if it is known that they have cholera or dysentery.

=== Water and sanitation ===
Clean water is essential for hygiene, for consumption and for feeding programmes (for mixing with powdered therapeutic milk or porridge), as well as for preventing the spread of water-borne disease. As such, MSF water engineers and volunteers must create a source of clean water. This is usually achieved by modifying an existing water well, by digging a new well and/or starting a water treatment project to obtain clean water for a population. Water treatment in these situations may consist of storage sedimentation, filtration and/or chlorination depending on available resources.

Sanitation is an essential part of field missions, and it may include education of local medical staff in proper sterilisation techniques, sewage treatment projects, proper waste disposal, and education of the population in personal hygiene. Proper wastewater treatment and water sanitation are the best way to prevent the spread of serious water-borne diseases, such as cholera. Simple wastewater treatment systems can be set up by volunteers to protect drinking water from contamination. Garbage disposal could include pits for normal waste and incineration for medical waste. However, the most important subject in sanitation is the education of the local population, so that proper waste and water treatment can continue once MSF has left the area.

=== Statistics ===
In order to accurately report the conditions of a humanitarian emergency to the rest of the world and to governing bodies, data on a number of factors are collected during each field mission. The rate of malnutrition in children is used to determine the malnutrition rate in the population, and then to determine the need for feeding centres. Various types of mortality rates are used to report the seriousness of a humanitarian emergency, and a common method used to measure mortality in a population is to have staff constantly monitoring the number of burials at cemeteries. By compiling data on the frequency of diseases in hospitals, MSF can track the occurrence and location of epidemic increases (or "seasons") and stockpile vaccines and other drugs. For example, the "Meningitis Belt" (sub-Saharan Africa, which sees the most cases of meningitis in the world) has been "mapped" and the meningitis season occurs between December and June. Shifts in the location of the Belt and the timing of the season can be predicted using cumulative data over many years.

In addition to epidemiological surveys, MSF also uses population surveys to determine the rates of violence in various regions. By estimating the scopes of massacres, and determining the rate of kidnappings, rapes, and killings, psychosocial programmes can be implemented to lower the suicide rate and increase the sense of security in a population. Large-scale forced migrations, excessive civilian casualties and massacres can be quantified using surveys, and MSF can use the results to put pressure on governments to provide help, or even expose genocide. MSF conducted the first comprehensive mortality survey in Darfur in 2004. However, there may be ethical problems in collecting these statistics.

=== Innovation and use of technology ===
In 2014 MSF partnered with satellite operator SES, other NGOs Archemed, Fondation Follereau, Friendship Luxembourg and German Doctors, and the Luxembourg government in the pilot phase of SATMED, a project to use satellite broadband technology to bring eHealth and telemedicine to isolated areas of developing countries. SATMED was first deployed in Sierra Leone in support of the fight against Ebola.

== Governance and structure ==
List of international presidents:

- 1991–1992 Rony Brauman
- 1992 Reginald Moreels
- 1992–1994 Rony Brauman
- 1994–1995 Jacques De Milliano
- 1995–1996 Doris Schopper
- 1996–1997 Philippe Biberson
- 1997–1998 Doris Schopper
- 1998–2000 James Orbinski
- 2000–2003 Morten Rostrup
- 2004–2006 Rowan Gillies
- 2006–2010 Christophe Fournier
- 2010–2013 Unni Karunakara
- 2013–2019 Joanne Liu
- 2019–2025 Christos Christou
- 2025–Present Javid Abdelmoneim

In addition to the Geneva global headquarters and five regional operational centers, as of 2025 MSF had national offices as follows:

1. MSF Australia
2. MSF Austria
3. MSF Beijing
4. MSF Belgium
5. MSF Brazil
6. MSF Canada
7. MSF Chile
8. MSF Colombia
9. MSF Czech Republic
10. MSF Denmark
11. MSF Eastern Africa
12. MSF Finland
13. MSF France
14. MSF Germany
15. MSF Greece
16. MSF Holland
17. MSF Hong Kong
18. MSF Ireland
19. MSF Italy
20. MSF Japan
21. MSF Lat (Spanish Speaking South America)
22. MSF Lebanon
23. MSF Luxembourg
24. MSF Mexico
25. MSF New Zealand
26. MSF Norway
27. MSF Poland
28. MSF Singapore
29. MSF South Africa
30. MSF South Asia - India
31. MSF South Asia - Sri Lanka
32. MSF South Korea
33. MSF Spain
34. MSF Sweden
35. MSF Switzerland
36. MSF Taiwan
37. MSF UAE
38. MSF United Kingdom
39. MSF Uruguay
40. MSF United States
41. MSF West and Central Africa

== In-house organisations ==
=== Epicentre ===
In 1986, MSF created Epicentre, an in-house research organisation, to support its activities. Epicentre conducts training, publishes scientific papers and develops new techniques for MSF. It performs epidemiological research, conducts clinical vaccine trials during outbreaks MSF is responding to, experiments on vaccine stability, and analysis of vaccine deployment strategy.

=== Campaign for Access to Essential Medicines ===
The Campaign for Access to Essential Medicines was initiated in 1999 to increase access to essential medicines in developing countries. "Essential medicines" are those drugs that are needed in sufficient supply to treat a disease common to a population. However, most diseases common to populations in developing countries are no longer common to populations in developed countries; therefore, pharmaceutical companies find that producing these drugs is no longer profitable and may raise the price per treatment, decrease development of the drug (and new treatments) or even stop production of the drug. MSF often lacks effective drugs during field missions, and started the campaign to put pressure on governments and pharmaceutical companies to increase funding for essential medicines.

In 2006, MSF tried to use its influence to urge the drug maker Novartis to drop its case against India's patent law that prevents Novartis from patenting its drugs in India. A few years earlier, Novartis also sued South Africa to prevent it from importing cheaper AIDS drugs. On 1 April 2013, it was announced that the Indian court invalidated Novartis's patent on imatinib (Gleevec). This decision makes the drug available via generics on the Indian market at a considerably lower price.

In March 2017, Els Torreele who had been leading the campaign from 1999 to 2003 returned to MSF as the executive director of the Access Campaign. For the following three years she led a global analysis and advocacy team whose goal was to guarantee that appropriate medicines, vaccines and diagnostics are developed, available, affordable and adapted to people's needs.

As of 2022, the most critical subjects of the campaign were rising antimicrobial resistance and outbreaks of epidemic diseases such as Ebola and COVID. Still, a lot of vaccines, diagnostics and medicines were inaccessible for people in need.

== Security risks to staff ==
MSF staff are sometimes attacked or kidnapped. In some countries, humanitarian-aid organisations are viewed as helping the enemy. If an aid mission is perceived to be exclusively set up for victims on one side of the conflict, it may come under attack. However, the war on terrorism has generated attitudes among some groups in US-occupied countries that non-governmental aid organisations such as MSF are allied with or even work for the Coalition forces. Insecurity in cities in Afghanistan and Iraq rose significantly following United States operations, and MSF has declared that providing aid in these countries was too dangerous. The organisation was forced to evacuate its teams from Afghanistan on 28 July 2004, after five staff (Afghans Fasil Ahmad and Besmillah, Belgian Hélène de Beir, Norwegian Egil Tynæs, and Dutchman Willem Kwint) were killed on 2 June in an ambush by unidentified militia near Khair Khāna in Badghis Province. In June 2007, Elsa Serfass, a staff member with MSF-France, was killed in the Central African Republic and in January 2008, two expatriate staff (Damien Lehalle and Victor Okumu) and a national staff member (Mohammed Bidhaan Ali) were killed in an organised attack in Somalia resulting in the closing of the project.

Arrests and abductions in politically unstable regions can also occur for volunteers, and in some cases, MSF field missions can be expelled entirely from a country. Arjan Erkel, Head of Mission in Dagestan in the North Caucasus, was kidnapped and held hostage in an unknown location by unknown abductors from 12 August 2002 until 11 April 2004. Paul Foreman, head of MSF-Holland, was arrested in Sudan in May 2005 for refusing to divulge documents used in compiling a report on rapes carried out by the pro-government Janjaweed militias (see Darfur conflict). Foreman cited the privacy of the women involved, and MSF alleged that the Sudanese government had arrested him because it disliked the bad publicity generated by the report.

=== Incidents ===
Below is a partial list of notable incidents of direct violence against MSF staff or facilities, in chronological order:

- 14 August 2013: MSF announced that it was closing all of its programmes in Somalia due to attacks on its staff by Al-Shabaab militants and perceived indifference or inurement to this by the governmental authorities and wider society.
- 3 October 2015: Fourteen staff and 28 others died when an MSF hospital was bombed by American forces during the Battle of Kunduz.
  - On 7 October 2015, US President Barack Obama issued an apology. Doctors Without Borders was not satisfied by Obama's apology.
- 27 October 2015: An MSF hospital in Sa'dah, Yemen, was bombed by the Saudi Arabia–led military coalition.
- 28 November 2015: An MSF-supported hospital was barrel-bombed by a Syrian Air Force helicopter, killing seven and wounding forty-seven people near Homs, Syria.
- 10 January 2016: An MSF-supported hospital in Sa'dah was bombed by the Saudi Arabia-led military coalition, killing six people.
- 15 February 2016: Two MSF-supported hospitals in Idlib District and Aleppo, Syria, were bombed, killing at least 20 and injuring dozens of patients and medical personnel. Both Russia and the United States denied responsibility or being in the area at the time.
- 28 April 2016: An MSF hospital in Aleppo was bombed, killing 50, including six staff and patients.
- 12 May 2020: an MSF-supported hospital in Dasht-e-Barchi, Kabul, Afghanistan, was attacked by an unknown assailant. The attack left 24 people dead and at least 20 more injured.
- 25 June 2021: Three MSF employees were reported killed in Tigray, Ethiopia.
- 18 November 2023: An evacuation convoy of MSF vehicles was attacked in Gaza, Palestine during the Gaza war, resulting in deaths of two family members of MSF workers with one being a volunteer supporting MSF at Al-Shifa Hospital. MSF reported "MSF considers that all elements point to the responsibility of the Israel Defense Forces for this attack".

== Awards ==
=== 1999 Nobel Peace Prize ===
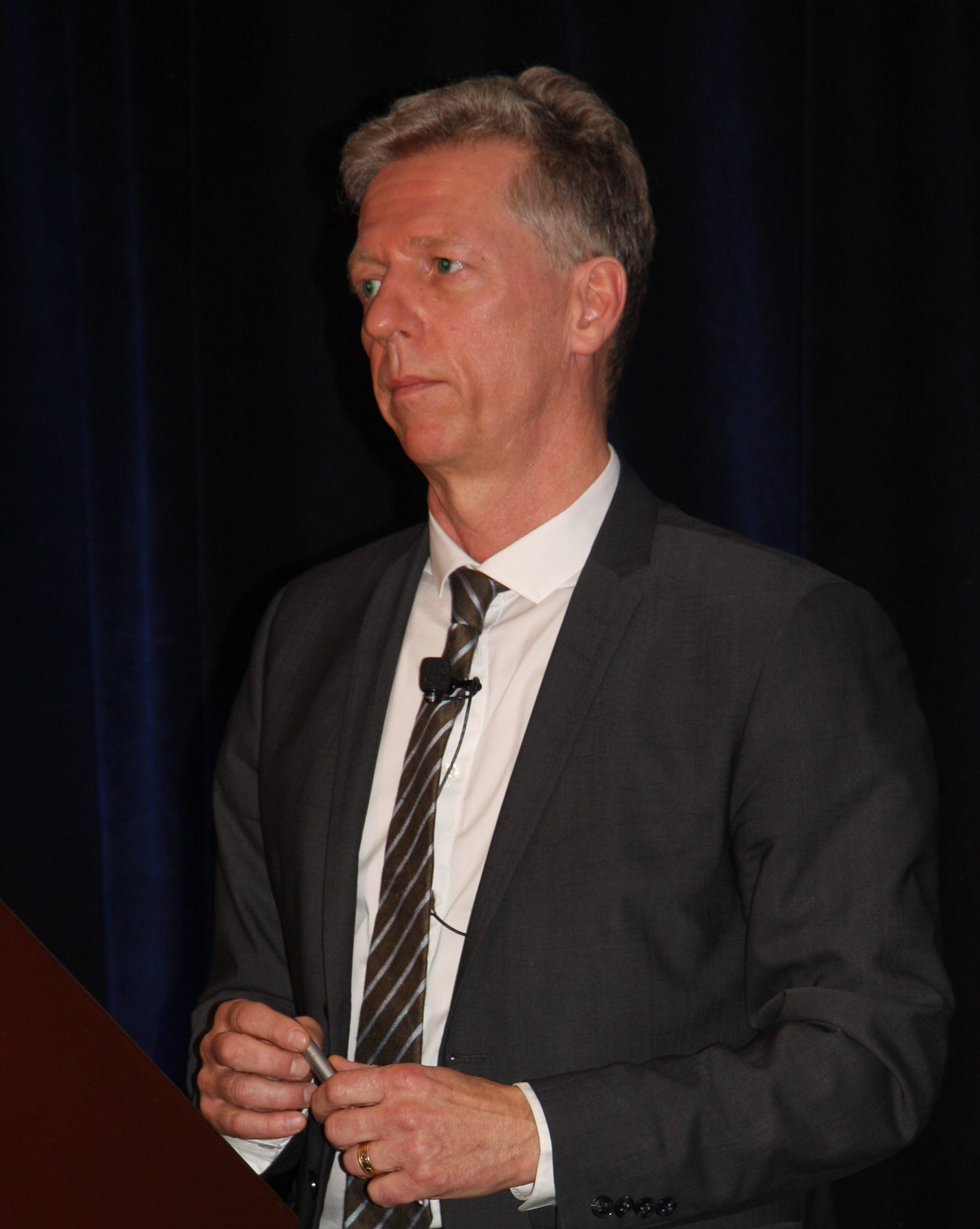
James Orbinski speaking about MSF in 2015

The then president of MSF, James Orbinski, gave the Nobel Peace Prize speech on behalf of the organisation. In the opening, he discusses the conditions of the victims of the Rwandan genocide and focuses on one of his woman patients:

There were hundreds of women, children and men brought to the hospital that day, so many that we had to lay them out on the street and even operate on some of them there. The gutters around the hospital ran red with blood. The woman had not just been attacked with a machete, but her entire body rationally and systematically mutilated. Her ears had been cut off. And her face had been so carefully disfigured that a pattern was obvious in the slashes. She was one among many—living an inhuman and simply indescribable suffering. We could do little more for her at the moment than stop the bleeding with a few necessary sutures. We were completely overwhelmed, and she knew that there were so many others. She said to me in the clearest voice I have ever heard, 'Allez, allez...ummera, ummerasha'—'Go, go...my friend, find and let live your courage.'

— James Orbinski, Nobel acceptance speech for MSF

Orbinski affirmed the organisation's commitment to publicising the issues MSF encountered, stating

Silence has long been confused with neutrality, and has been presented as a necessary condition for humanitarian action. From its beginning, MSF was created in opposition to this assumption. We are not sure that words can always save lives, but we know that silence can certainly kill.

— James Orbinski

=== Other awards ===
- 2015 Lasker–Bloomberg Public Service Award, from the New York based Lasker Foundation.
- 2016 Hamdan Award for Volunteers in Humanitarian Medical Services, from Hamdan Medical Award.

=== Other recognition ===
MSF's "Bracelet of Life", the Middle Upper Arm Circumference (MUAC) measuring band, was included in Pirouette: Turning Points in Design, a 2025 exhibition at the Museum of Modern Art featuring "widely recognized design icons [...] highlighting pivotal moments in design history." The museum also added MUAC to its Architecture and Design collection.

== Namesakes ==
A number of other unrelated non-governmental organisations have adopted names ending in "Sans Frontières" or "Without Borders", inspired by Médecins Sans Frontières, for example: Engineers Without Borders, Avocats Sans Frontières ('Lawyers Without Borders'), Reporters sans frontières ('Reporters Without Borders'), Payasos Sin Fronteras ('Clowns Without Borders'), Bibliothèques Sans Frontières ('Libraries Without Borders'), and Homeopaths Without Borders.

The French game show Jeux Sans Frontières ('Games Without Borders') is older than MSF, being first broadcast in Europe in 1965.

The 2010 video game Metal Gear Solid: Peace Walker used Militaires Sans Frontières (MSF) as the player's main base. Because this shares the same acronym with the real MSF, a disclaimer to differentiate the two was added to the 2011 re-release of the game.

== Ethical concerns and criticism ==
Questions about the ethical treatment of MSF staff, clients and communities by MSF as a result of some of its policies and practices have arisen, with issues being canvassed by employees, others in the development sector, and the media.

MSF has maintained separate employment conditions and pay for its "national staff" (those employed locally for field missions) and its "international staff" (those deployed from regional or national units to field missions in other countries). The international staff tend to hold the senior posts on a mission, with the national staff most often reporting to the senior staff who have come from elsewhere. There are ongoing complaints from national staff that they are treated less favourably, employed on more dangerous tasks, paid considerably less, and are without access to benefits of housing, health care, and other advantages afforded incoming expatriate staff. MSF stated in 2020 that this policy would be reviewed with the intent to eliminate differential treatment. These practices, amongst other concerns, were the catalyst for a 2020 statement by 1,000 of its current and former employees outlining their concerns regarding the organisation's perceived structural racism. Included in the collective staff statement was testimony of personal experiences of racism within MSF, both in the form of adverse treatment in the workplace, and what is perceived as a white supremacist and colonial mindset expressed in the formation and implementation of programmes.

While MSF hires ninety percent of its staff for missions "in-country", the organisation continues to have a preponderance of Europeans in its higher management. Despite the percentage of its international programme coordinators originating from the Global South rising from 24 percent to 46 percent over the decade 2012−2022, the international president Christos Christou acknowledged that the highest echelons of MSF were still dominated by those from the Global North. With its headquarters and five operational units located in western Europe, MSF's policies and operations were characterised in the 2020 MSF-staff statement as "Eurocentric".

In 2018, there were revelations of sexual misconduct by MSF employees, including sexual harassment and abuse of patients, local community members or other MSF staff. Nineteen people were fired as a result of MSF's investigations of complaints. The complaints ranged from sexual harassment by MSF colleagues; exploitation of local (and possibly underage or solely "survival sex") sex workers by field staff, against MSF policy; and disparaging attitudes and remarks from staff regarding the supposed sexual availability of patients or community members, or an expressed intent to barter medical treatment for sex. Nearly all the resulting dismissals related to inter-staff sexual misconduct.

Another controversy involved images taken without informed consent of vulnerable patients, some of whom were minors without adult guardians. Some images were criticised as exploitative and objectifying. They included a photograph of a mother mourning the death of her baby, with the boy's body visible; child rape survivors and sexual and domestic abuse survivors, with details of their experiences included. Intended to increase awareness of dire conditions prevailing in places where MSF works and the need for their programmes, the images were used on MSF and community websites and in print publications. Licenses for the images were available for sale to image databases. The ethics of exposing devastated or victimised individuals, sometimes with partially identifying information were questioned. Following the criticism, MSF decided to cease use of the images. The removal of the images was in turn also criticised.

MSF's funding model has come under scrutiny after BlackRock donated $500,000 towards its COVID-19 crisis fund, leading to calls of hypocrisy from staff and other humanitarian organisations.

=== Decline of medical aid during the Hong Kong protests ===
On 17 November 2019, Darren Mann, a medical doctor who provided first aid to protesters, wrote in The Lancet about the arrest of medics during the 2019 Hong Kong Polytechnic University campus conflict and that police had issued warnings about the potential use of live ammunition. Mann called on the Red Cross and Médecins Sans Frontières (MSF) to intervene. The Red Cross agreed to send personnel into the Hong Kong Polytechnic University campus, while MSF issued a statement on 18 November, claiming that "medical resources and rescue capabilities provided by various sectors of Hong Kong society are sufficient" and declined to offer medical aid. Their statement reportedly triggered online backlash, leading to a wave of donation suspensions. Multiple celebrities, including Wong He, Gregory Wong, and Gloria Yip, also responded by cutting their donations.

On 19 November, Hong Kong Inmedia reported that MSF's hotline could "never get through" and their headquarters was crowded with people intending to cancel their donations. MSF reportedly attempted to reject these suspensions, although they denied such rumors. Also on 19 November, MSF sent a four-member team into the university campus to "assess the situation". Apple Daily columnist Lee Bat-fong criticized that MSF only reacted after the widespread donation suspensions, describing their actions as "rushing to the university to patch things up"; while pundit Donald Yu wrote that, "given Hong Kong's status as the second-largest fundraiser globally for MSF, it was surprising that even in such an advanced society, there was doublespeak. It calls into question whether MSF's claims of aid to Africa were exaggerated".

The controversy resulted in a 28.2% decrease in the number of donors and a 16.8% drop in donation amounts in the region during 2020. In February 2020, MSF issued a statement to "sincerely apologise for the confusion between what [they] said and what [they] did in PolyU" and they reinstated their voluntary medical work carried out during the 2019–2020 Hong Kong protests.

=== Suspension of operation in Gaza ===
In December 2025, the Israeli government announced it would revoke the licenses of MSF and more than 30 other humanitarian organisations operating in the Gaza Strip effectively preventing them from continuing their activities during the ongoing Gaza war.

The Israeli Ministry of Diaspora Affairs and Combating Antisemitism stated that the MSF and other organizations had failed to comply with new registration requirements, including providing information about staff, funding sources, and operational structures.

As of early 2026, MSF has stated that around 15 of its staff members have been killed since October 2023. It said repeated attacks on health workers and medical facilities by the Israel Defence Forces had made it nearly impossible for it to provide healthcare.

As of January–February 2026, Israel confirmed it would enforce the deregistration of 37 non-governmental organizations, including MSF, requiring them to cease operations and depart by early March 2026.

On February 11, 2026, MSF published a project update explaining their partial suspension of medical operations at Nasser Hospital in Khan Yunis. This included staff and patients at the facility reporting "armed men, some of them masked," and suspected the movement of weapons within the compound. Citing these security breaches and a loss of control over the hospital's neutrality, MSF suspended all non-critical medical operations at the facility as of January 20, 2026.

== Publications ==
- Bortolotti, Dan (2006). Hope in Hell: Inside the World of Doctors Without Borders. Firefly Books. ISBN 978-1-55407-634-5.
- Brown, Damien (2013). Band-aid for a broken leg: Being a doctor with no borders (and other ways to stay single). Sydney: Allen & Unwin. ISBN 978-1-74331-556-9. A doctor's memoir of his first MSF posting on the medical frontlines in Angola, Mozambique, and South Sudan
- The Photographer: Into War-torn Afghanistan with Doctors Without Borders, graphic 'novel' (a memoir in graphic-novel format) by Guibert, Emmanuel (2009); photography and narration by Didier Lefèvre; colourist: Frédéric Lemercier. New York: First Second Books. ISBN 978-1596433755
- Living in Emergency: Stories of Doctors Without Borders, 2008 documentary film by Mark N. Hopkins that tells the story of four MSF volunteer doctors confronting the challenges of medical work in war-torn areas of Liberia and Congo
- Six Months in Sudan, 2009 memoir by doctor James Maskalyk
- An Imperfect Offering, 2008 memoir by former MSF president James Orbinski
- Triage: Dr. James Orbinski's Humanitarian Dilemma, 2007 documentary

== See also ==
- Attacks on humanitarian workers
