= Centrale des Syndicats Libres de Côte d'Ivoire =

Dignité
- Centrale des Syndicats Libres de Côte d'Ivoire
- Headquarters: Abidjan, Côte d'Ivoire
- Location: Côte d'Ivoire
- Members: 186 trade unions, 20 prof. groups
- Key people: Basile Mahan Gahé, secretary general
- Affiliations: ITUC
- Website: www.rerumnovarum.or.cr

The Centrale des Syndicats Libres de Côte d'Ivoire (Dignité) is a trade union centre in Côte d'Ivoire.

ICTUR reports previous conflict between the government of Côte d'Ivoire and union members. In 1993 - 94 15 people died in the months following a dispute at the state-owned company Ihro La Mé. In June of the following year 618 workers from the same company were reported to be living in the jungle after the army evicted them from their houses. Other activities include damage to, and police occupation of Dignité headquarters.

Dignité is affiliated with the International Trade Union Confederation.
