= James Maskalyk =

Canadian physician and writer

- Born: Alberta, Canada
- Citizenship: Canadian
- Education: University of Alberta, University of Calgary, University of Toronto
- Occupations: Medical doctor, author, editor
- Writing career
- Language: English
- Subject: Emergency medicine
- Notable works: Six Months in Sudan; Life on the Ground Floor
- Website: www.jamesmaskalyk.com

James Maskalyk is a Canadian emergency medicine physician, author, DJ and meditation teacher.

He works at St. Michael's Hospital in Toronto, and is the strategic director of Toronto-Addis Ababa Academic Collaboration in Emergency Medicine, which has frequently taken him to Ethiopia. He was the executive editor-in-chief of the Canadian Medical Association Journal.

His work for Médecins sans Frontières in Abyei was the focus of his first memoir Six Months in Sudan, which was nominated for, among others, the John Llewellyn Rhys Prize. His second book, Life on the Ground Floor, won the 2017 Hilary Weston Writers' Trust Prize for Nonfiction. He was nominated one of the "50 most influential Torontonians" in 2023.

== Early life ==
Maskalyk was born in Alberta to parents who owned an lumber-planing business just outside of Edmonton.

== Education ==
In 1995, Maskalyk graduated with a degree in physiology from the University of Alberta where he studied gastrointestinal physiology and psychoneuroimmunology and won the Heritage Medical Research Award.

Maskalyk graduated with a degree in medicine from the University of Calgary in 1999. While studying, he did a medical elective in Santiago, studying cardiology and health system. During his medical residency he worked in Cambodia with recently surrendered Khmer Rouge, providing primary care and helping the University of Toronto develop a medical elective where students and residents could study medicine in lower-resource settings. Also, during his residency, he turned down an offer to study at Harvard University in order to do a writing fellowship at the Canadian Medical Association Journal, where he also wrote the journal's first blog, in conjunction with Medecins Sans Frontieres, exploring why some diseases are neglected by the pharmaceutical industry.

In 2004, Maskalyk qualified as an emergency specialist from the University of Toronto.

== Career ==
Maskalyk's 2014 paper on open medicine

Prior to becoming a physician, Maskalyk worked in a sawmill, as a courier, cleaner, security contractor, and disc-jockey.

Maskalyk is an associate professor at University of Toronto's Faculty of Medicine, and an emergency room physician and trauma team leader at St. Michael's Hospital in Toronto. He also works as a wellness coordinator for St. Michael's Hospital's staff. He has been praised for highlighting the issue of drug interactions with grapefruit consumption, and encouraging awareness of global health at all levels of university education.

Maskalyk has worked for Médecins sans Frontières in Dadaab refugee camp, Kenya, and in 2007, Abyei, Sudan. He has also worked in Black Lion Hospital, Addis Ababa, Ethiopia, and is the strategic director of Toronto-Addis Ababa Academic Collaboration in Emergency Medicine, an institutional partnership designed to create the first system of emergency medicine in Addis Ababa. He has also worked in Cambodia and Bolivia.

Maskalyk was a founding editor of then open-source, open-access, medical journal Open Medicine. He has spent has career looking at a systems approach to global equity in healthcare, and minimizing conflict of interest in researcher's contracts with industry. In 2022-2023, he took a turn as the executive editor in chief of the Canadian Medical Association Journal.

His writing on global issues has appeared in The Washington Post, and The Globe and Mail where he wrote a diary describing the early days of the COVID19 pandemic in Canada. He has collaborated with Turtle Lodge to address inequities in healthcare experienced by Canada's indigenous people.

Maskalyk hosts regular public events on Facebook, where he leads meditation sessions and conversations about a wide rage of topics including sex, alcohol, kindness, existentialism, exercise, economics, computer modelling, and death. He is also a music-lover and long-time DJ.

== Books ==
=== Six Months in Sudan ===
Originally written as the first ever official blog for Médecins Sans Frontières, Six Months in Sudan was adapted into the 2009 autobiographical memoir of Maskalyk's work in the village of Abyei in Sudan. Treating illness, disease and trauma from vehicle collisions and violence, Maskalyk is overwhelmed by heat, exhaustion, and his own emotional struggles facing an overwhelming gap between healthcare needs and the capacity his colleagues can offer.

=== Life on the Ground Floor ===
In 2017, Maskalyk released his second autobiographical memoir Life on the Ground Floor, in which he shares stories about his work in emergency departments in Canada, Ethiopia, Cambodia and Bolivia. The book has 26 chapters, A through Z, each an unusual perspective of working in an emergency department. Life on the Ground Floor won the Hilary Weston Writers' Trust for Nonfiction award, Canada's largest non-fiction award, in 2017 and has been translated into many languages.

=== Doctor, Heal Thyself ===
Maskalyk has been working on his third book Doctor, Heal Thyself, writing about western, Traditional Chinese and Indigenous medicine.

== Personal life ==
He has a younger brother, Dan.
