= All the Birds, Singing =

Novel by Evie Wyld

- Author: Evie Wyld
- Language: English
- Genres: Literary
- Publisher: Random House, Australia
- Publication date: 2013
- Publication place: Australia
- Media type: Print (Paperback)
- Pages: 240 pp
- ISBN: 9781742757308
- Preceded by: After the Fire, A Still Small Voice
- Followed by: The Bass Rock

All the Birds, Singing is a 2013 novel set in Australia by English author Evie Wyld. In 2014, it won the Miles Franklin Award and the Encore Award.

== Synopsis ==
Alternating chapters tell of Jake's present (in the past tense) and her past (in the present tense).

In the present, Jake Whyte lives on a remote Scottish island with her sheep and her dog. Something begins killing - but not eating - one of her sheep every few nights, and she grows increasingly paranoid as she investigates what it could be. One night, she finds a drunk man named Lloyd sleeping in a shed on her property, but allows him to stay when he denies any knowledge of the killings, eventually inviting him into her guest room. Lloyd helps her with the flock, and encourages her to go into town and visit the pub more often, but she is resistant, preferring to be alone.

One night during lambing season, she leaves Lloyd with the sheep and goes up to the house for a bath, and comes to believe she has been followed by a wild animal. She trips in the tub and hits her head hard, but Lloyd finds her before she can drown. After a visit from the doctor, she tells Lloyd that she wants to move the entire flock into the house until she can find what is killing them, but he says he won't let her, implying that the monster is imaginary and she is losing her mind. She then points out that the abandoned lamb they had brought inside to bottle feed has gone missing, presumably taken by the monster when it followed her home.

A few nights later, Jake believes she sees the monster out the window, and chases after it with her shotgun. In the dark, she accidentally shoots one of her own sheep, and seems to accept that it is all in her head. However, the next day, as she and Lloyd are driving into town, he orders her to stop, claiming he "saw it." He gets out of the truck, following something into the woods, and she chases after him. They stop together, watching something in the underbrush, and Lloyd says "My God" as they hold hands, but what they see is never revealed.

In the past, 15-year-old Jake lives in Australia with her parents, older sister, and younger triplet brothers. She has no friends and is frequently bullied. One day, the boy she has a crush on, Denver, offers to walk her home, and begins to do it regularly to protect her from her bullies. She thinks he is flirting with her, but he eventually reveals that he is secretly dating Flora, and the two are planning to run away from her disapproving father. He befriended Jake in the hopes that she would help them.

Jake is angry that he would use her, and grows angrier when he says Flora picked her out of pity. Denver threatens to beat Jake if she tells anyone, then leaves her on a path near Flora's house, where she lights a joint and smokes it in the grass. She touches it to a leaf, and the entire field goes up in flames. Jake flees the fire as it spreads, while Denver runs towards it to rescue Flora.

Flora dies, and Denver is burned beyond recognition and left in a coma. Much of the town burns down as well, and the townspeople believe Denver to have started the fire to cover his tracks after raping and murdering Flora. Jake visits him in the hospital, believing people in comas can still hear, and tells him that if he survives, she will confess to clear his name. However, she is overheard by a police officer posted at the door. On her way home, a group of locals run her down and hold her to the ground while Flora's father savagely beats her with a stick, leaving permanent scars.

After being run out of town, she resorts to prostitution to survive, and eventually agrees to go live with one of her regulars, Otto, thinking it will be safer to service only one client. Otto grows increasingly abusive, locking her in her room at night, refusing to teach her how to drive, and mangling her bicycle so she can't escape. He forces her to slaughter his sheep, getting an erection as he watches. It is implied that he murdered his wife.

Jake steals Otto's cash and truck and drives far down the coast, several towns away, where she gets a job at a sheep-shearing station. However, one of the men there discovers missing person posters for her put up by Otto, who claims to be her grandfather, and tries to extort sex out of her. Having recently inherited fifty-thousand dollars after her father's death in a boating accident, she travels to Scotland and buys a farm.

== Reception ==
=== Reviews ===
- Peter Clothier in The Huffington Post: "Wyld's prose is as muscular, sinewy, unsparing as this remarkable character. It has the precision of poetry, but without adornment, unnecessary wordage, or concession to literary conceit. The story, a hero's journey patterned on descent, ordeal--and redemption of a kind--is as compelling as the character who tells it."
- Tim Lewis in The Guardian: " All the Birds, Singing should enhance her reputation as one of our most gifted novelists. Her pacing is impeccable and the trickle of information she marshals lends tension and compassion to Jake's troubled, solitary existence."

=== Awards ===
Awards for All the Birds, Singing
Year	Award	Result	Ref.
2013	Encore Award	Winner	
2014	Baileys Women's Prize for Fiction	Longlist	
2014	Jerwood Fiction Uncovered Prize	Winner	
2014	Miles Franklin Award	Winner	
2014	Queensland Literary Awards – Fiction Book	Shortlist	
2014	Stella Prize	Longlist	
2014	Western Australian Premier's Book Awards – Fiction	Shortlist	
