= Morwenna (disambiguation) =

The name Morwenna may refer to:

- Morwenna, a Cornish saint
- Morwenna Banks, a British comedian
- Morwenna Donnelly, a 20th century British writer
- Morwenna Ludlow, a priest and historian
- Morwenna Talling, a rugby union player
