= John Llewellyn Rhys Prize =

Award for literature written in English by a Commonwealth author

- Awarded for: the best work of English-language literature published in the UK by an author from the British Commonwealth at the age of 35 or under
- Country: United Kingdom
- Presented by: The Mail on Sunday (1987–2002); BookTrust (2003–2010)
- First award: 1942; 84 years ago
- Final award: 2010; 16 years ago
- Website: http://www.booktrust.org.uk/prizes-and-awards/3

The John Llewellyn Rhys Prize was a literary prize awarded annually for the best work of literature (fiction, non-fiction, poetry, or drama) by an author from the Commonwealth aged 35 or under, written in English and published in the United Kingdom. Established in 1942, it was one of the oldest literary awards in the UK.

Since 2011, the award has been suspended by funding problems. The last award was in 2010.

== History ==
The prize was initiated in 1942 by Jane Oliver in memory of her husband, John Llewellyn Rhys, a young author who was killed on 5 August 1940 while serving as a bomber pilot in the Royal Air Force.

From 1987 to 2003, the prize was funded by The Mail on Sunday. The newspaper withdrew in 2003, after the initial winner of 2002 prize, Hari Kunzru, rejected the prize and criticised the Mail of Sunday for "hostility towards black and Asian people" Subsequently, the prize was sponsored by BookTrust, an independent educational charity, but in June 2011 the award was suspended due to funding problems. Booktrust said that it "strongly" intended to bring the award "back with a bang as soon as possible" as it looked for outside funding sources.

In 2010, the winner received £5,000, while the runners-up each received £500.

== Winners (1942–1999) ==
John Llewellyn Rhys Prize winners, 1942–1999
Year	Author	Title	ISBN (or OCLC)	Ref.
1942	Michael Richey	Sunk by a Mine		
1943	Morwenna Donnelly	Beauty for Ashes	OCLC 10175035	
1944	Alun Lewis	The Last Inspection	OCLC 1648392	
1945	James Aldridge	The Sea Eagle	OCLC 1115675	
1946	Oriel Malet	My Bird Sings	OCLC 1550666	
1947	Anne-Marie Walters	Moondrop to Gascony	OCLC 458854780	
1948	Richard Mason	The Wind Cannot Read	OCLC 2188096	
1949	Emma Smith	Maidens' Trip	OCLC 771823005	
1950	Kenneth Allsop	Adventure Lit Their Star	OCLC 77347740	
1951	Elizabeth Jane Howard	The Beautiful Visit	OCLC 1637250	
1952	No award			
1953	Rachel Trickett	The Return Home	OCLC 21354135	
1954	Tom Stacey	The Hostile Sun	OCLC 2451930	
1955	John Wiles	The Moon to Play With	OCLC 1508671	
1956	John Hearne	Voices Under the Window	OCLC 2175560	
1957	Ruskin Bond	The Room on the Roof	OCLC 1579534	
1958	V. S. Naipaul	The Mystic Masseur	OCLC 47838372	
1959	Dan Jacobson	A Long Way from London	OCLC 1161266	
1960	David Caute	At Fever Pitch	OCLC 753130422	
1961	David Storey	Flight into Camden	OCLC 1816514	
1962	Robert Rhodes James	An Introduction to the House of Commons	OCLC 1825470	
1962	Edward Lucie-Smith	A Tropical Childhood and Other Poems	OCLC 2469981	
1963	Peter Marshall	Two Lives	OCLC 1301629	
1964	Nell Dunn	Up the Junction	OCLC 1675517	
1965	Julian Mitchell	The White Father	OCLC 1246449	
1966	Margaret Drabble	The Millstone	OCLC 1355165	
1967	Anthony Masters	The Seahorse	OCLC 1018374	
1968	Angela Carter	The Magic Toyshop	ISBN 978-0-860-68190-8	
1969	Melvyn Bragg	Without a City Wall	ISBN 978-0-340-43102-3	
1970	Angus Calder	The People's War	ISBN 978-0-712-65284-1	
1971	Shiva Naipaul	Fireflies	ISBN 978-0-140-03150-8	
1972	Susan Hill	The Albatross	ISBN 978-0-140-03649-7	
1973	Peter Smalley	A Warm Gun	ISBN 978-0-233-96172-9	
1974	Hugh Fleetwood	The Girl Who Passed for Normal	ISBN 978-0-812-87034-3	
1975	David Hare	Knuckle	ISBN 978-0-571-04980-6	
1975	Tim Jeal	Cushing's Crusade	ISBN 978-0-434-37209-6	
1976	No award			
1977	Richard Cork	Vorticism & Abstract Art in the First Machine Age	ISBN 978-0-900-40624-9	
1978	A. N. Wilson	The Sweets of Pimlico	ISBN 978-0-140-06697-5	
1979	Peter Boardman	The Shining Mountain	ISBN 978-0-099-20920-1	
1980	Desmond Hogan	The Diamonds at the Bottom of the Sea	ISBN 978-0-241-10123-0	
1981	A. N. Wilson	The Laird of Abbotsford	ISBN 978-0-192-11756-4	
1982	William Boyd	An Ice-Cream War	ISBN 978-0-241-95356-3	
1983	Lisa St Aubin de Terán	The Slow Train to Milan	ISBN 978-0-140-06954-9	
1984	Andrew Motion	Dangerous Play	ISBN 978-0-140-07352-2	
1985	John Milne	Out of the Blue	ISBN 978-0-241-11489-6	
1986	Tim Parks	Loving Roger	ISBN 978-0-802-10016-0	
1987	Jeanette Winterson	The Passion	ISBN 978-0-099-73441-3	
1988	Matthew Yorke	The March Fence	ISBN 978-0-140-11636-6	
1989	Claire Harman	Sylvia Townsend Warner	ISBN 978-0-701-12938-5	
1990	Ray Monk	Ludwig Wittgenstein: The Duty of Genius	ISBN 978-0-099-88370-8	
1991	A. L. Kennedy	Night Geometry and the Garscadden Trains	ISBN 978-0-099-45006-1	
1992	Matthew Kneale	Sweet Thames	ISBN 978-0-140-29663-1	
1993	Jason Goodwin	On Foot to the Golden Horn: A Walk to Istanbul	ISBN 978-0-701-13668-0	
1994	Jonathan Coe	What a Carve Up!	ISBN 978-0-141-03329-7	
1995	Melanie McGrath	Motel Nirvana	ISBN 978-0-006-54715-0	
1996	Nicola Barker	Heading Inland	ISBN 978-0-007-43571-5	
1997	Phil Whitaker	Eclipse of the Sun	ISBN 978-0-753-80948-8	
1998	Peter Ho Davies	The Ugliest House in the World	ISBN 978-0-395-78629-1	
1999	David Mitchell	Ghostwritten	ISBN 978-0-340-73974-7	

== Winners and shortlists (since 2000) ==
John Llewellyn Rhys Prize winners and shortlists, 2000–2010
Year	Author	Title	Result	Ref.
2000	Edward Platt	Leadville	Winner	
2000	Julia Leigh	The Hunter	Finalist	
2000	Roddy Lumsden	The Book of Love	Finalist	
2000	Cole Moreton	Hungry for Home Leaving the Blaskets: A Journey from the Edge of Ireland	Finalist	
2000	Ben Rice	Pobby and Dingan	Finalist	
2000	Zadie Smith	White Teeth	Finalist	
2001	Susanna Jones	The Earthquake Bird	Winner	
2001	Esther Morgan	Beyond Calling Distance	Finalist	
2002 (Note: The 2002 prize was initially awarded to Hari Kunzru for his book The Impressionist on 20 November 2003, but the author decided to decline the award due to its sponsorship by The Mail on Sunday.)	Mary Laven	Virgins of Venice	Winner	
2002	Sonya Hartnett	Thursday's Child	Finalist	
2002	Chloe Hooper	A Child's Book of True Crime	Finalist	
2002	Mary Laven	Virgins of Venice	Finalist	
2002	Kamila Shamsie	Kartography	Finalist	
2003	Charlotte Mendelson	Daughters of Jerusalem	Winner	
2004	Jonathan Trigell	Boy A	Winner	
2004	Chimamanda Ngozi Adichie	Purple Hibiscus	Finalist	
2004	Neil Bennun	The Broken String: The Last Words of an Extinct People	Finalist	
2004	Anthony Cartwright	The Afterglow	Finalist	
2004	Colin McAdam	Some Great Thing	Finalist	
2004	Rory Stewart	The Places in Between	Finalist	
2005	Uzodinma Iweala	Beasts of No Nation	Winner	
2005	Rana Dasgupta	Tokyo Cancelled	Finalist	
2005	Peter Hobbs	The Short Day Dying	Finalist	
2005	Sinéad Morrissey	The State of the Prisons	Finalist	
2005	Rebecca Ray	Newfoundland	Finalist	
2005	Rachel Zadok	Gem Squash Tokoloshe	Finalist	
2006/7	Sarah Hall	The Carhullan Army	Winner	
2006/7	Ceridwen Dovey	Blood Kin	Finalist	
2006/7	Joanna Kavenna	Inglorious	Finalist	
2006/7	Robert Macfarlane	The Wild Places	Finalist	
2006/7	Gwendoline Riley	Joshua Spassky	Finalist	
2006/7	Rory Stewart	Occupational Hazards	Finalist	
2008	Henry Hitchings	The Secret Life of Words	Winner	
2008	Aravind Adiga	The White Tiger	Finalist	
2008	Adam Foulds	The Broken Word	Finalist	
2008	James Palmer	The Bloody White Baron	Finalist	
2008	Ross Raisin	God's Own Country	Finalist	
2008	Brian Schofield	Selling Your Father's Bones	Finalist	
2009	Evie Wyld	After the Fire, a Still Small Voice	Winner	
2009	Chimamanda Ngozi Adichie	The Thing Around Your Neck	Finalist	
2009	Aravind Adiga	Between the Assassinations	Finalist	
2009	Emma Jones	The Striped World	Finalist	
2009	James Maskalyk	Six Months in Sudan	Finalist	
2009	Tristram Stuart	Waste: Uncovering the Global Food Scandal	Finalist	
2010	Amy Sackville	The Still Point	Winner	
2010	Cordelia Fine	Delusions of Gender	Finalist	
2010	Susan Fletcher	Corrag	Finalist	
2010	Kei Miller	A Light Song of Light	Finalist	
2010	Nadifa Mohamed	Black Mamba Boy	Finalist	
2010	Daniel Swift	Bomber County	Finalist	

== See also ==
- List of British literary awards
- List of literary awards
- List of years in literature
