= Western Avenue, London =

Major road in Greater London, England

Coordinates: 51.525°N 0.271°W

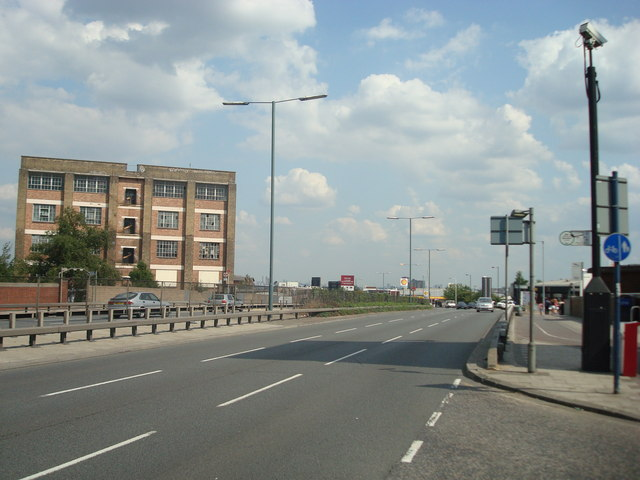
Western Avenue

Western Avenue is part of the A40, a major road running in a north-westerly direction out of London. Western Avenue is approximately 10 miles (16 km) long from its junction with Old Oak Common Lane in East Acton.

A notable landmark on Western Avenue at Perivale, near Greenford, is the Art Deco Hoover Building, now a Tesco supermarket and 66 homes.

== History ==
The road was first proposed in 1912 as a bypass of Uxbridge Road, part of the historic coaching road from London to Oxford. Construction began in 1921 and continued throughout the 1920s and 30s. It was completed to Denham in 1943. When first constructed, all intersections with other roads were flat junctions with roundabouts, resulting in significant congestion at busy periods.

In the early 1960s, the Hanger Lane junction was improved, with an underpass built to take Western Avenue under the A406. Then, during the 1980s and early 1990s, the road was expanded, and all the junctions west of Hanger Lane were improved. A flyover was built at the Greenford Roundabout to take Western Avenue over the A4127; the other junctions take Western Avenue under the crossing road.

The last junction to be improved was Hillingdon Circus. Here, the work diverted Western Avenue to the north of the old line of the road, taking it under both the A437 and the Uxbridge branch of the Metropolitan line; Hillingdon London Underground Station was rebuilt as part of the work.

Further expansion plans in the late 1990s resulted in the demolition of more than 100 houses along the eastern part of the road. However, these plans were ultimately never realised.

== Route ==
Originally a roundabout, Western Circus became known as Savoy Circus, when the Savoy cinema opened at the junction in 1931. East of this point is the Westway, part of the A40 Central London link to Paddington. After Savoy Circus, the dual carriageway takes a bend towards North Acton, crossing the North London line and the Great Western Main Line. The first major junction is Gypsy Corner (with the A4000, 0.8 miles (1.3 km)), connecting northwards to Park Royal and Harlesden and southwards to Acton town centre. Starting with the Hanger Lane Gyratory System (with the A406 and A4005, 2 miles (3.2 km)); this is followed by a junction with the (B452) at Perivale (4 miles (6.4 km)), connecting southwards to West Ealing and the River Thames at Kew Bridge; the Greenford Roundabout (with the A4127, 5 miles (8.0 km)), connecting northwards to Harrow and southwards to Southall; the Target Roundabout (with the A312, 6.5 miles (10.5 km)), a junction for Heathrow Airport; and the Polish War Memorial junction (with the A4180, 7.5 miles (12.1 km)) for RAF Northolt.

In the final few miles of the road, there are minor junctions with the A437 (Hillingdon Circus) to Ruislip and Hillingdon, and with the B467 (Swakeleys Roundabout) to Uxbridge, before the road ends at the junction with the M40 at the Denham Roundabout, northwest of Uxbridge.

== Air crash ==
Western Avenue borders RAF Northolt in South Ruislip. On Tuesday 13 August 1996, in a very unusual accident, a Lear Jet landing at the airfield overshot the runway and ended up crashing into a van that just happened to be passing on the A40. The van driver was not seriously injured, despite being trapped for 40 minutes. It was later determined that the crash may have been caused when the Spanish pilot and co-pilot were having a disagreement over who should handle the landing. There was only one passenger on the Lear Jet, an actress named Lisa Hogan, who was slightly injured.

== In popular culture ==
- Western Avenue features heavily in Crash, the 1973 J. G. Ballard novel about symphorophilia (car-crash fetishism).
- Edward Platt won the John Llewellyn Rhys Prize and a Somerset Maugham Award for his 2000 book Leadville, about the Western Avenue.

== See also ==
- Eastern Avenue, London
