= Six Months in Sudan =

Autobiography of humanitarian doctor in Sudan

- Author: James Maskalyk
- Language: English
- Subjects: Emergency medicine Médecins Sans Frontières
- Genre: Non-fiction, autobiography
- Publisher: Anchor Canada
- Publication date: 2009
- Publication place: Canada
- ISBN: 978-0385665964

Six Months in Sudan is a 2009 autobiographical memoir by Canadian doctor James Maskalyk about his 2007 work in the village of Abyei, Sudan, for Médecins Sans Frontières. Six Months in Sudan was initially written as a blog, which Maskalyk later turned into a book.

== Summary ==
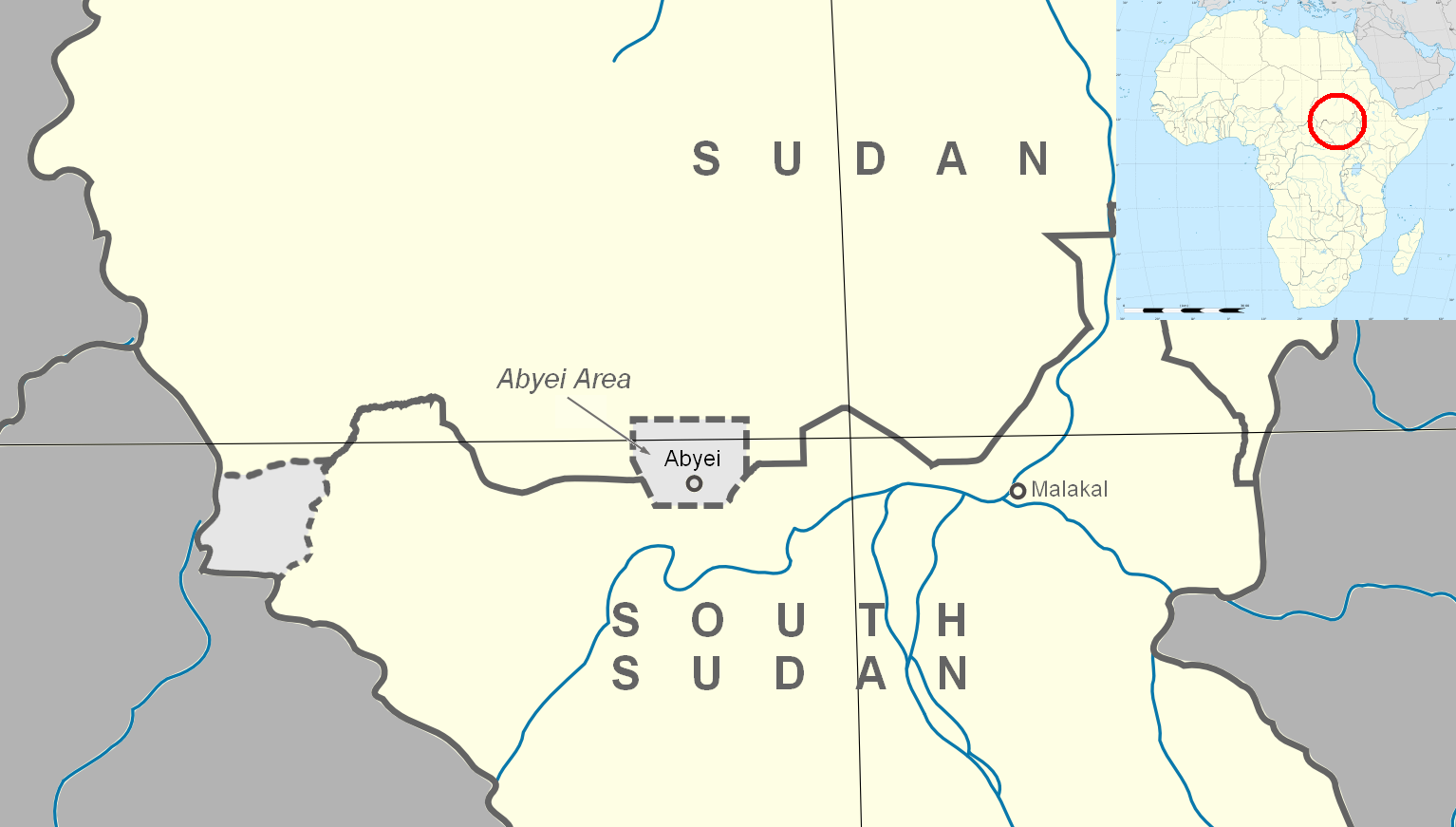
Map of Abyei and surrounding area

In 2007 Maskalyk, a young Toronto emergency doctor, is recruited by Médecins Sans Frontières and is deployed to work in the contested border town of Abyei, a place of extreme poverty, and a location where Sudanese militias clash with their South Sudanese counterparts. The story continues with the logistical challenges of getting to Abyei, a bureaucratically complicated series of journeys, requiring extreme patience.

In Abyei, Maskalyk treats malnutrition and disease, assists with complicated births, and cares for injuries from the nearby conflict and vehicle collisions. Throughout the book, he is overwhelmed by the healthcare needs of the community, and his own emotional struggles. Maskalyk treats tuberculosis, pneumonia, fevers, and infections and is forced to turn away people with minor and non-life-threatening conditions. Soon after his arrival, a measles outbreak overwhelms the medical team. Hunger and death feature frequently throughout the book.

Maskalyk documents the impact of the work on the local and international healthcare providers who do their best to help despite the lack of resources and toll on their own mental health. His desires to spend more time learning about the local culture of the Dinka and Misseriya tribes are not realized due to the extreme workload. His sleep is impaired by the noise at night and the relentless heat, and he is disturbed by the insufficiency of the medical staff to meet the overwhelming needs of the local populace, despite the team's best efforts.

Maskalyk documents the tension between Médecins Sans Frontières and the United Nations and writes about internal tensions he personally suffers, torn between the desire to help and the fear of the violence around him.

The journey finishes with his return to Toronto, and his reflections and unanswered questions about the obligations he has to others in the world.

== Writing style ==
Initially written as an unedited blog, the spelling and syntax errors are published verbatim, giving the book a "you-are-there immediacy" as described in Kirkus Reviews.

== Reception ==
The book received mostly positive reviews from critics, who praised its unpolished writing style, and intimate understanding of the complexities of life in Sudan. Richard B. Woodward of The New York Times described Six Months in Sudan as "moving" and "honest".

The Vancouver Sun described it as bleak but uplifting:

"A rich story that gives a wonderful, raw awareness of what we are as humans ... Our hopes and illusions are stripped away, yet we are left not with despair but with a deeper appreciation and a sense of wonder ... Brilliant writing. I’m sure Maskalyk is a fine doctor, but he’s an even better writer"

The Globe and Mail said:

"One of the greatest successes of Six Months in Sudan is that it does not try to be anything more than it is—a moment in time ... [It] can be read and enjoyed by those who are interested in the humanitarian movement and in global issues, as well as by those who glance at the headlines and want to know what it is like to be there, responding to world tragedies as they unfold"

The Irish Times gave the book a positive review, citing its "intimate" and "honest" writing style.

Jackie Shymanski of the Winnipeg Free Press praised the book's insight into the issues of warfare, poverty, disease and famine in Sudan. The Financial Times gave the book a similarly positive review, praising its "fluent" writing style and the author's personal understanding of the situation in Sudan.

Writing for the Canadian Medical Association Journal, Gretchen Roede described the book as "haunting", and cited its ability to bridge the gap of understanding between people who have done humanitarian work and those who aspire to enter the field, or support humanitarian efforts.

== Awards ==
Six Months in Sudan was nominated for the John Llewellyn Rhys Prize in 2009, and was also a finalist for the Shaughnessy Cohen Prize for Political Writing in the same year.

== Sequel ==
In 2017, Maskalyk released the follow-up book Life on the Ground Floor.

== See also ==
- An Imperfect Offering
