= Life on the Ground Floor =

Doctor's autobiography set in Toronto and Addis Ababa

Life on the Ground Floor: Letters from the Edge of Emergency Medicine
- Author: James Maskalyk
- Language: English
- Subjects: Emergency medicine Humanitarian Aid
- Genre: Autobiography
- Publisher: Doubleday Canada
- Publication place: Canada
- Pages: 272
- ISBN: 9780385665988

Life on the Ground Floor: Letters from the Edge of Emergency Medicine is an autobiographical book by Canadian doctor James Maskalyk about his work and reflections on working in emergency departments in St Michael's Hospital in Toronto, Canada, and Black Lion Hospital in Addis Ababa, Ethiopia, as well as work in Cambodia and Bolivia.

Life on the Ground Floor was released on 11 April 2017 as a follow-up to Maskalyk's first book, Six Months in Sudan.

== Plot summary ==
The book is broken into 26 chapters, which follow the alphabet from A to Z, with each chapter consisting of a short essay. The stories are mostly set in Toronto or Addis Ababa and each offer unusual perspectives of working in hospital emergency departments.

== Critical reception ==
While reviewing the book, Heather Mallick of the Toronto Star described Maskalyk as "A master of the medical memoir."

André Picard praised Maskalyk for his humility and for avoiding the common pitfalls made by Western observers of low-income countries: "the strength of the book is that it captures the viscera, real and symbolic, of the ER – its sights, sounds, smells, pulse – without romanticizing the work."

The book was one of the Canadian Broadcasting Corporation's top ten non-fiction books of the year in 2017, and the Globe and Mail's top 100 books of 2017.

The memoir was a Globe and Mail best book of 2017, made the National Post's Best Books of 2017, and was a Chatelaine best book of 2017.

== Awards ==
The book won the 2017 Hilary Weston Writers' Trust Prize for Nonfiction award. Accordingly to the judging panel, Maskalyk: "reveals compelling universal truths about the power, and limits, of medicine — 'life caring for itself,' as he defines it — the strength of human will, and the fragile, infinitesimal gap between dying and living,"

Also in 2017, the novel was nominated for the Toronto Book Awards.

In 2018, the book was shortlisted for the RBC Taylor Prize.

Life on the Ground Floor was shortlisted for the 2018 Trillium Book Award and for the 2018 Edna Staebler Award for Creative Non-Fiction.

It was long-listed for the 2018 British Columbia National Award for Canadian Nonfiction.

It made the Canada Reads 2019 Long list.

== See also ==
- Six Months In Sudan
