= Benjamin Yeoh =

British Chinese playwright (born 1978)

- Born: Benjamin Seng-Loong Yeoh; December 1978 (age 47)
- Occupation: playwright
- Writing career
- Period: 2001 to present
- Genre: drama
- Website: www.benjaminyeoh.com

Benjamin Seng-Loong Yeoh (born December 1978) is a British Chinese playwright and financial analyst.

== Early life and education ==
Yeoh was born on the outskirts of London; his father came from Ipoh, Malaysia, and his mother from Singapore. Yeoh won a scholarship to Westminster School. He went on to study Natural Sciences at Emmanuel College, Cambridge, and then to Harvard University as a Herchel Smith scholar studying dramaturgy and play writing.

Yeoh is among the first generation of writers to have come from the Soho Theatre Young Writers' Programme. In 2005 he was on the Royal Court Theatre's writers' programme.

== Career ==
Yeoh has directed several plays and has been involved with writing groups and mentorships such as Royal Court Writers, Soho Young Writers, BBC Radio, Moti Roti, Talawa and Yellow Ink. He sat on the board and then as chair of Talawa Theatre Company for eight years until 2012.

Yeoh's first play, Lemon Love, was performed by Louie Bayliss and Salima Saxton at the Finborough Theatre, London, in 2001. Lemon Love is a revenge love story involving a mystical older couple guiding and berating a younger couple in their stormy relationship. It was directed by Elizabeth Freestone.

His second full-length piece, Lost in Peru, was first performed at the Camden People's Theatre, London, in 2003. It was Arts Council of England funded. The play dealt with torture and interwove personal tragedies with those on a larger scale particularly 'the disappeared' in Latin America.The Guardian suggested that "while Yeoh and director Sarah Levinsky should get praise for trying to push the boundaries of form and style, both probably need reminding that there is no point in innovations and performance styles whose tricksiness threaten to bore the audience to death".

A reading of his third play, called Yellow Men at the time (2004), was performed at the Soho Theatre, produced by Yellow Earth Theatre. It also received Arts Council funding. Yellow Men was renamed Yellow Gentlemen and performed at the Oval House Theatre in February - March, 2006. Time Out wrote of it that there was a "vertiginous sense of possibility and regret present in Yeoh's intelligent script".

Patent Breaking Life Saving, directed by Jessica Dromgoole, was broadcast by BBC World Service in December 2006. The play was about an African president who hits his head and starts giving out medicines for free.

The Places in Between, a dramatisation of the book by Rory Stewart, directed by Kirsty Williams, was broadcast on BBC Radio 4 on 15 February 2007. The story is about Rory Stewart's walk across Afghanistan just after the fall of the Taliban.

Nakamitsu (2007) won the Gate Theatre Translation Award. It is a version of a Japanese Noh play. The Guardian said of Nakamitsu: "Small but exquisitely formed, Benjamin Yeoh's new version of a 14th-century Japanese Noh play is fusion theatre, borrowing from east as well as west. It is both strange and familiar, accessible and remote, restrained and yet somehow full-blown". The Times said of it "The play is just 50 minutes long, yet its richness gives it stature".

Yeoh wrote the recorded dialogue for Coney's interactive re-imagining of Kensington Palace's State apartments, called "House of Cards" (2012-14).

Yeoh co-wrote, with David Finnigan, and performed Thinking Bigly, a performance-lecture at Theatre Deli, London, and on-line versions. Laura Kressly called it "an engaging, informative and interactive presentation that gives a wide-angle view on what we can do to save the planet". From 2021-25 he performed another performance-lecture at Camden People's Theatre and Theatre Deli, in which he asked the audience to help plan his funeral.

His story "The Invention of Fireworks" was read on BBC Radio 3 in 2004 by David Yip.

Yeoh also works as a financial analyst. He won the Thomson Extel Award for Best Sector Sell-side Analyst for Integrated Socially Responsible Investment Analysis in 2003. Yeoh sat on the UK financial regulatory body Financial Reporting Council Investor Advisory group (from 2018) and the Royal London Asset Management Sustainable Investing advisory committee. As of 2021, Yeoh was an associate fellow of Chatham House, Sustainability Accelerator.

== See also ==
- British Chinese
- Overseas Chinese
- List of overseas Chinese
- List of British Chinese people
