= Edward Platt (author) =

English writer (born 1968)

- Born: 1968 (age 57–58); Chelmsford, Essex, England
- Education: University of Oxford
- Occupation: Writer
- Writing career
- Notable awards: John Llewellyn Rhys Prize (2000); Somerset Maugham Award (2001)

Edward Platt (born 1968) is an English writer.

Platt won the John Llewellyn Rhys Prize and a Somerset Maugham Award for his 2000 book Leadville, about the Western Avenue section of the A40 road in London.

Platt was born in Chelmsford, Essex, and grew up in Hampshire, Northumberland, and the Wirral. Since 1992, he has lived in London.

His second book, The City of Abraham, published in 2012, is about the West Bank city of Hebron.

He was a book reviewer and feature writer between 1995 and 2007 for several national newspapers including The Daily Telegraph, The Daily Express, The Sunday Times and The Guardian, Evening Standard, Financial Times, and Independent on Sunday. He contributed to the Big Issue magazine between 1993 and 2000.

== Bibliography ==
- Leadville (2000)
- The City of Abraham (Picador, 2012)
