= Amy Sackville =

British writer (born 1981)

Amy Sackville FRSL (born 1981) is a British writer whose debut novel The Still Point was the winner of the 2010 John Llewellyn Rhys Prize.

Sackville studied English and theatre studies at Leeds University, followed by an MPhil at Oxford's Exeter College before taking a job in the publishing industry. She also studied an MA in creative writing at London's Goldsmiths College.

Her first novel, The Still Point, was published in 2010 and nominated for that year's Orange Prize for Fiction. Her second novel, Orkney, won a Somerset Maugham Award in 2014. Her third novel, Painter to the King, about Diego Velázquez and the court of Philip IV of Spain was published in 2018.

In June 2018 Sackville was elected Fellow of the Royal Society of Literature in its "40 Under 40" initiative.
