= Politics on the Edge =

2023 political memoir by Rory Stewart

- 2023 cover
- Author: Rory Stewart
- Genre: Memoir
- Publisher: Jonathan Cape
- Publication date: 15 September 2023
- Pages: 454
- ISBN: 978-1787332713

Politics on the Edge: A Memoir from Within is a memoir by former Conservative Party politician and host of The Rest Is Politics podcast Rory Stewart. In the United States, the book was published under the title How Not to Be a Politician: A Memoir. In the book, Stewart argues that there has been a decline in political standards in the United Kingdom, and criticises former Conservative prime minister Boris Johnson. The book discusses Stewart's 2019 Conservative Party leadership election campaign, and critiques centralized government and argues for Civil Service reform.

== Synopsis ==
The book comprises six parts and twenty-six chapters. The first part discusses Stewart's work as a governor of an Iraqi province during its occupation and running a non-governmental organization in Kabul and then his work as a Harvard University academic on human rights policy and global governance, and his decision to become a Member of Parliament (MP) in the United Kingdom. It discusses his election campaign and initial experiences of the British Parliament. The second part discusses Stewart's work as an MP, including his attempts to improve access to broadband in Cumbria and his work on select committees. “Part three discusses the outcome of the Brexit referendum and the 2017 election. Stewart observes and analyses the effects on his party and society in general of the expected effects of leaving the European Union.

Part four discusses Stewart's experience with Boris Johnson. He describes his first meeting with Johnson and their similar educational backgrounds and working at the Foreign Office when Johnson was Foreign Secretary. Part five discusses Stewart's role at the Ministry of Justice. Part six discusses Stewart's role campaigning for Theresa May's Brexit deal, its rejection by Parliament, his campaign to become leader of the Conservative Party, Johnson's victory, and Stewart's ejection from the Conservative Party and decision not to run as an independent candidate for MP.

== Critical reception ==
Reviewing in The Guardian, Luke Harding describes the book as a "brilliant portrait of a nation in decline" and refers to Stewart as a modern James Boswell. Reviewing in the political magazine The House, historian Peter Hennessy calls the book "truly absorbing" and "fascinating". Reviewing in The Scotsman, Joyce McMillan praised an exceptional political memoir and described it as a pleasure to read. Reviewing in the Financial Times, Gideon Rachman said the book is likely to become a classic. Writing in The Atlantic, Michael Ignatieff describes the book as a brilliant and unsparing portrait of Stewart's time in politics.

Hennessy says that the book is a study in pain and disillusionment. Harding says that it is hard to disagree with Stewart's conclusions. McMillan feels that, owing to Stewart's distrust of all forms of ideology, he fails to offer a real analysis of the causes of problems. She posits that Tory attacks on "big government" and underfunding have led to a loss of integrity within the state and a growth of corporate interests. While she says that Stewart does not offer solutions, she says he vividly and eloquently sets out problems.

Cherwell reviewed the book positively and reserved especial praise for Stewart himself:

"In a Parliament and more specifically a party filled with hundreds of bleating robots, he is a free intelligence, with a rich appreciation of the arts, nature, history, tradition, and cultures. He is an anachronism, not in the cartoonish sense, but because if he were referred to as a “right honourable gentleman”, it would be a fact rather than an appellation. No other modern politician could say without irony that he believes in love of country, respect for tradition, prudence at home, and restraint abroad, or could give a speech containing the line that 'True courage is not the opposite of cowardice, but the golden mean, between cowardice and foolhardiness.' Had he been born a century and a half earlier, Stewart might have been remembered as one of the great Victorian statesmen, a Prime Minister or a Viceroy, as well as a man of letters."

The book was long-listed for the 2024 Lakeland Book of the Year.
