= Melanie McGrath =

English writer

- Born: Romford, London, United Kingdom
- Occupation: Author
- Writing career
- Pen name: M.J. McGrath; Mel McGrath
- Years active: 1996–present
- Genres: Non-fiction; Crime fiction

Melanie McGrath is a Romford-born English non-fiction writer and crime novelist.

== Early life ==
Born in Romford, McGrath's parents moved several times during her childhood; to Basildon in Essex, then to a village in Germany, to Kent, then north to Lancashire, and south again to Buckinghamshire. She studied Philosophy, Politics and Economics at Oxford University.

== Career ==
She won the John Llewellyn Rhys Prize in 1995 for her non fiction book Motel Nirvana, which examined the New Age movement, and detailed McGrath's travels around the American states of Nevada, Colorado, New Mexico and Arizona. Her other non-fiction books have explored the "Information Age" (Hard, Soft and Wet), 20th century British social history, (Hopping and Silvertown) and the non-fiction book, The Long Exile about the High Arctic relocation.

In recent years, McGrath has written crime novels, including a trilogy set in the Arctic with Inuit detective Edie Kiglatuk, and the standalone thriller Give Me the Child. As a book reviewer and travel writer, she has written for The Daily Telegraph, The Guardian and The Independent among other publications. McGrath has taught creative writing at the universities of Roehampton University and North Carolina as well as at The Arvon Foundation. McGrath lives in London and on the Kent coast.

== Bibliography ==
=== Non fiction ===
- 1996 - Motel Nirvana Flamingo
- 1998 - Hard, Soft and Wet Flamingo
- 2002 - Silvertown, Fourth Estate
- 2006 - The Long Exile, Fourth Estate
- 2009 - Hopping, Fourth Estate
- 2018 - Pie & Mash down the Roman Road, Two Roads

=== Crime fiction ===
Edie Kiglatuk trilogy

- 2011 - White Heat, Mantle (as M.J. McGrath)
- 2012 - The Boy in the Snow, Mantle (as M.J. McGrath)
- 2014 - The Bone Seeker, Fourth Estate (as M.J. McGrath)

Standalone

- 2017 - Give Me the Child, HarperCollins (as Mel McGrath)
- 2019 - The Guilty Party, HarperCollins (as Mel McGrath)
