= Leadville (book) =

2000 book by Edward Platt

Leadville: A biography of the A40
- First edition
- Author: Edward Platt
- Cover artist: Gigi Sudbury; Catherine Platt
- Language: English
- Publisher: Picador
- Publication date: 2000
- Publication place: United Kingdom
- Pages: 293
- Awards: John Llewellyn Rhys Prize; Somerset Maugham Award
- ISBN: 0-330-39262-X
- OCLC: 51923133

Leadville is a book by English writer Edward Platt, published in 2000 by Picador. It won both the John Llewellyn Rhys Prize and the Somerset Maugham Award. Cambridge History of Science lecturer Patricia Fara selected it as one of her books of the decade.

Subtitled "A Biography of the A40" and with the strapline "A Journey from White City to the Hangar Lane Gyratory" it tells the story of Western Avenue, an arterial road in West London primarily through the words of its residents whom the author visited between 1995 and 1998. At this time many of the houses on the road were being compulsorily purchased and demolished in preparation for a road widening scheme which was later cancelled. Interspersed with the views of the residents are historical accounts of the road's development and wider views on town planning and traffic management, prominently those of Le Corbusier and Robert Moses.
