= Peter Hobbs (novelist) =

British novelist

Peter Hobbs (born 1973) is a British novelist.

He grew up in Cornwall and North Yorkshire and was educated at New College, Oxford. He began writing during a prolonged illness that cut short a potential diplomatic career.

He is the author of two novels: The Short Day Dying (2005) and In the Orchard, the Swallows (2012), and of I Could Ride All Day in my Cool Blue Train (2006), a book of short stories. He is also published in New Writing 13, an annual anthology of new work, and 'Zembla'. He is currently a writer-in-residence for the charity First Story, where he inspires young writers to write short stories and poems which are published in a yearly anthology.

The Short Day Dying was short-listed for the 2005 Whitbread First Book Award (known now as the Costa Book Awards), the 2005 John Llewellyn Rhys Prize, the 2007 International Dublin Literary Award and won a 2006 Betty Trask Award.

Hobbs was elected a Fellow of the Royal Society of Literature in 2014.
