= Evie Wyld =

Anglo-Australian author

Evie Wyld FRSL
- Born: 1980 (age 45–46); London, England
- Citizenship: British and Australian
- Education: Bath Spa University; Goldsmiths, University of London
- Spouse: Jamie Coleman (m. 2013)
- Writing career
- Notable awards: John Llewellyn Rhys Prize (2009); Encore Award (2013); Miles Franklin Award (2014); Stella Prize (2021)
- Website: eviewyld.com

Evelyn Rose Strange "Evie" Wyld FRSL (born 1980) is an English author. Several of her novels are set in Australia, where she spent holidays with her grandparents as a child, and she has won several Australian literary awards. Her first novel, After the Fire, A Still Small Voice, won the John Llewellyn Rhys Prize in 2009, and her second novel, All the Birds, Singing, won the Encore Award in 2013 and the Miles Franklin Award in 2014. Her third novel, The Bass Rock, won the Stella Prize in 2021.

== Early life and education ==
Evelyn Rose Strange Wyld was born in London in 1980. Her mother, who is Australian, met her English father in the late 1960s, and they had intended to live in Australia; however, her father found it not to his liking, so they stayed in England, living in Peckham Rye, South London. Her mother is a conservator and her father worked as an art dealer.

The family visited Australia often, and Wyld retains strong memories of her grandparents' sugar cane farm in New South Wales. When she was a child she sometimes told people in England that she was from Australia, "to try and sound more interesting", but that was not true.

As a child she was very introverted, and also suffered from viral encephalitis.

She obtained a BA from Bath Spa University in 2002 and an MA from Goldsmiths, University of London in 2004, both in creative writing. During the time in between, she worked as in a library for a stroke association.

== Literary career ==
Wyld is the author of the John Llewellyn Rhys Prize and Betty Trask Award-winning novel After the Fire, A Still Small Voice and All the Birds, Singing. In 2010 she was listed by The Daily Telegraph as one of the 20 best British authors under the age of 40. In 2011 she was listed by the BBC's Culture Show as one of the 12 Best New British Writers. In 2013 she was included on the once a decade Granta Best of Young British Novelists List. Her novels have been shortlisted for the Costa Novel Prize, The Miles Franklin Award, the Commonwealth Writers Prize, the Orange Award for New Writers, the International IMPAC Dublin Literary Award, The Sky Arts Breakthrough Award, the James Tait Black Prize and The Author's Club Prize, and longlisted for the Stella Prize and the Baileys Women's Prize for Fiction.

She took over from Nii Parkes as Booktrust's online "Writer in Residence" in 2010, before passing the baton on to Polly Dunbar.

Her second novel, All the Birds, Singing, was published in February 2013 and concerns an Australian sheep farmer working on an English hill farm. The book won the 2014 Miles Franklin Award in June 2014.

Her third novel, The Bass Rock, was published by Jonathan Cape on 26 March 2020. Set in Scotland, it explores the lives of three women living in different centuries and the ways their lives are impacted by masculinity and male violence.

Her fourth novel, The Echoes, was published by Jonathan Cape in August 2024. Set in Wangkatha Country in Western Australia and in London, it uses a ghostly narrator and multiple time shifts to consider themes of love, trauma, and history, including the effect of the Stolen Generations on Aboriginal people. Some early reviews were positive, while others criticised Wyld's "voyeuristic and disrespectful" treatment of First Nations history, the Stolen Generations, and Australia's colonial past. Writer Karen Wyld (no relation) wrote that Wyld had "applied a white-gazed approach to her depictions of First Nations peoples and history... Using dehumanising racial stereotypes and tropes...".

She is a writing coach at The Novelry.

== Awards and honours ==
- 2009: Winner, John Llewellyn Rhys Prize, for After the Fire, A Still Small Voice
- 2010: Winner, Betty Trask Award, for After the Fire, A Still Small Voice
- 2013: Listed, Granta list of 20 Best of Young British Novelists
- 2013: Shortlisted, Costa Book Awards (Novel), for All the Birds, Singing
- 2013: Winner, Encore Award, for All the Birds, Singing
- 2014: Winner, European Union Prize for Literature, UK, All the Birds, Singing
- 2014: Winner, Miles Franklin Award, for All the Birds, Singing
- 2018: Elected Fellow of the Royal Society of Literature in its "40 Under 40" initiative
- 2021: Shortlisted, Christina Stead Prize for Fiction, for The Bass Rock
- 2021: Winner, Stella Prize, for The Bass Rock
- 2022: Shortlisted, Barbara Jefferis Award, for The Bass Rock
- 2025 Shortlisted, Victorian Premier's Prize for Fiction, for The Echoes

== Personal life ==
Wyld regards herself as English, but does have dual nationality (British and Australian). She has spent most of her life in Peckham. In 2012 she was living in Brixton and working at an independent bookshop in Peckham.

She married literary agent Jamie Coleman in July 2013.

== Bibliography ==
- —— (2009). After the Fire, A Still Small Voice (hardcover 1st ed.). London: Pantheon. ISBN 9780307378460.
- —— (2013). All The Birds, Singing (hardcover 1st ed.). London: Jonathan Cape. ISBN 9780224096683.
- —— (2020). The Bass Rock (hardcover 1st ed.). London: Jonathan Cape. ISBN 9781911214397.
- —— (2024). The Echoes (hardcover 1st ed.). London: Jonathan Cape. ISBN 9781101871904.

=== Short stories ===
- "What will happen to the dog after we are dead?" (published in Goldfish: An Anthology of Writing from Goldsmiths)
- "The Convalescent's Handbook" (online) first published in Sea Stories, an anthology from the National Maritime Museum
- "The Building Opposite" (appeared in 3:AM Magazine anthology London, New York, Paris)
- "The Whales" (online) from Booktrust
- "Menzies Meat" (online)
- "Free Swim" (online)
- "Six Degrees of Separation" (online)
