= Occupational Hazards =

Book by Rory Stewart

- Cover of 2006 Picador edition
- Author: Rory Stewart
- Language: English
- Publisher: Picador
- Publication date: December 2006
- Pages: 546 pages
- ISBN: 978-0-330-44049-3
- Preceded by: The Places in Between
- Followed by: Can Intervention Work?
- Website: www.rorystewart.co.uk

Cover of 2007 Harvest Books ed with alternative title

Occupational Hazards: My Time Governing in Iraq or The Prince of the Marshes: And other Occupational Hazards of a Year in Iraq is a 2006 non-fiction book by the British writer and later Member of Parliament Rory Stewart.

== Content ==
Occupational Hazards documents Stewart's experiences as Coalition Provisional Authority Deputy Governor of the Iraqi province of Maysan and Senior Advisor in the province of Dhi Qar. These provinces in the remote, impoverished marsh regions of southern Iraq were home to a diverse number of parties and peoples and Stewart spends much of his time mediating, negotiating hostage releases, holding elections, and trying to restore order to a society which seemed on the edge of civil war, following the Iraq War. Much of the book is concerned with Stewart's dealings with the Prince of the Marshes, a local warlord who had fought against Saddam Hussein and regarded Stewart's actions with suspicion. Occupational Hazards explores the hostility experienced by Coalition troops and administrators, mostly notably when, in May 2004, Stewart and his compound in Nasiriyah were besieged by Sadrist militia, an experience he recounted in his Desert Island Discs appearance of 2008.

== Reception ==
Occupational Hazards received positive reviews following its publication, with The New York Times critic William Grimes describing it as "a rueful, richly detailed, often harrowing account...the real value of [which] is Mr. Stewart's sobering picture of the difficulties involved in creating a coherent Iraqi state based on the rule of law". David Morphet, writing in The Guardian, described it as "an extraordinarily vivid tale with many exciting episodes" and Maya Jasanoff called it "an eye-opening and at times enthralling book" in London Review of Books.

== Adaptations ==
In 2017, the book was adapted for the stage by Stephen Brown, debuting at Hampstead Theatre under the title Occupational Hazards.
