= The Still Point =

2010 novel by Amy Sackvill

- Author: Amy Sackville
- Language: English
- Genre: Novel
- Publisher: Portobello Books Ltd
- Publication date: 4 February 2010
- Publication place: United Kingdom
- Pages: 320 pp
- ISBN: 1-84627-229-7

The Still Point is a 2010 novel by British author Amy Sackville. The book was Sackville's debut novel, and was the winner of the 2010 John Llewellyn Rhys Prize. It had also earlier been nominated for that year's Orange Prize for Fiction.

== Synopsis ==
The book's two central characters are Edward Mackley, an Arctic explorer who went missing during an expedition at the turn of the 20th century, and his great-grand-niece Julia, who lives a hundred years later. On a hot summer's day Julia begins sorting through the belongings she has inherited from her uncle, while trying to ignore the cracks which are appearing in her marriage. However, as the day wears on she makes a discovery that forces her to re-evaluate her long-held image of her uncle, her husband Simon faces a choice that will decide the future of their relationship.
