= After the Fire, a Still Small Voice =

2009 novel by Evie Wyld

After the Fire, A Still Small Voice
- First UK edition
- Author: Evie Wyld
- Cover artist: Wallzo
- Language: English
- Publisher: Jonathan Cape (UK); Pantheon (US)
- Publication date: 2009
- Publication place: United Kingdom
- Media type: Print, Audio & eBook
- Pages: 304
- Awards: Betty Trask Award; John Llewellyn Rhys Prize
- ISBN: 0-224-08887-4
- Dewey Decimal: 823/.92
- LC Class: PR6123.Y43 A69 2009

After the Fire, A Still Small Voice is the debut novel by English author Evie Wyld, published in 2009. It won the John Llewellyn Rhys Prize and was shortlisted for the International Dublin Literary Award.

== Plot introduction ==
The story is set in Queensland on the East Coast of Australia and concerns two men from different generations, as described in the blurb on the back cover of the 2010 Vintage edition:

- Frank is trying to escape his troubled past by running away to his family's beach shack. As he struggles to make friends with his neighbours and their precocious young daughter Sal, he discovers the community has fresh wounds of its own. A girl is missing, and when Sal too disappears, suspicion falls on Frank.
- Decades earlier, Leon tries to hold together his family's cake shop as their suburban life crumbles in the aftermath of the Korean War. When war breaks out again, Leon must go from sculpting sugar figurines to killing young men as a conscript in the Vietnam War.

== Title and publication ==
The book's title is taken from 1 Kings 19:12.

The novel was published in 2009 by Jonathan Cape in the UK and Pantheon in the US.

== Critical reception ==
- Lee Rourke in The Independent on Sunday writes: "Landscape plays a major role in Wyld's writing. It opens up the narrative, creating an eerie metaphorical space, or silence, between each character, mirroring the physical and mental fissures that separate each generation. Although nothing is truly silent: even the landscape is "thick with insect noise". The power of this mesmerising novel hangs on the premise that silence is impossible, while such impossibility forces the men who litter its landscape to desire it all the more." and Rourke concludes: "Wyld's writing is assured enough to elongate metaphor and symbolism, creating a novel both taut and otherworldly. This adroit examination of loss, lostness and trauma is the beginning of great things".
- The Observer has the following praise from Francesca Segal, "The landscape of Australia's east coast looms large in the book, wild and sinister, filled with light and tragedy. This is a sad and lovely novel from a talented new writer".
- The New Yorker praises the novel: "Wyld has a feel both for beauty and for the ugliness of inherited pain. The mood is creepy—strange creatures in the sugar cane, grieving neighbors, a missing local girl—and the sentiment is plain: 'Sometimes people aren't all right and that's just how it is.'"

== Awards ==
After the Fire, A Still Small Voice won the John Llewellyn Rhys Prize and a Betty Trask Award.

It was shortlisted for both the Orange Award for New Writers and the International Dublin Literary Award.
