= Toronto-Addis Ababa Academic Collaboration =

Academic collaboration

The Toronto-Addis Ababa Academic Collaboration is a university educational program to teach medicine in Ethiopia.

The Toronto-Addis Ababa Academic Collaboration was launched in 2008, as a wider program that grew from an earlier 2003 collaboration called the Toronto Addis Ababa Psychiatry Program.

The Toronto-Addis Ababa Academic Collaboration involves the University of Toronto providing teaching support to Addis Ababa University. Both universities pay costs, the program is run frugally, and it does not receive any external funding.

Since it started, the scope of the collaboration has grown to include 24 medical and non-medical academic disciplines.

== History ==
The Toronto-Addis Ababa Academic Collaboration is the successor to the original, and ongoing, Toronto Addis Ababa Psychiatry Program. The Psychiatry Program has a syllabus designed by Addis Ababa University faculty, delivered by University of Toronto faculty.

The Psychiatry Program provides training in physiatry to medical students at Addis Ababa University and works with priests to encourage referral to, and acceptance of, medical care for people with mental illness.

Following discussions that started in 2008, in 2013, the collaboration grew into the Toronto-Addis Ababa Academic Collaboration in Emergency Medicine, and the partnership expanded to include the University of Wisconsin. The Emergency Medicine teaching is done at the Black Lion Hospital (also known as Tikur Anbessa Hospital) in Addis Ababa. The first graduates of the emergency medicine program graduated in 2016.

== Outcomes ==
As of 2017, 222 Ethiopian graduates have become university faculty due to assistance from the collaboration and a further 143 were enrolled in ongoing education.

The program has increased the number of psychiatry graduates in Ethiopia and reduced the percentage of Ethiopian medical graduates who leave the country after graduation.
