= Morwenna Donnelly =

British writer

Marjorie Morwenna Donnelly Collins (29 Mar 1917–17 Jun 1992), known as Morwenna Donnelly, was a British writer who won the John Llewellyn Rhys Prize in 1943 for her "book-length poem" Beauty for Ashes.

Poet Sidney Keyes reviewed Beauty for Ashes in the periodical Kingdom Come and compared her favorably to Rainer Maria Rilke, writing that "like Rilke she is finally answered, and accepts the revelation. That is the important fact."

In 1956, Donnelly wrote Founding the Life Divine: An Introduction to the Integral Yoga of Sri Aurobindo, about the teachings of the yogi, maharishi, and Indian nationalist. Ten years later, she chaired a meeting on Sri Aurobindo at which George Harrison gave a lecture.

In 1967, she sent a letter to the editor of The Times in defense of The Sound of Music, which the newspaper had criticized as appealing "mainly to simple housewives or those living in unlovely surroundings." She wrote, "It is certainly happy, beautiful, and gay; but it also reiterates the fact that individuals can solve their problems, and face danger and disaster, if they stand on firm ground and not on a spiritual quagmire of rotten values. I suggest it is this positive and hopeful note which strikes such a deep chord in audiences. " She listed her address as Ashdon Hall, in Saffron Walden, Essex.

Born in Greenwich, London, on 29 March 1917, her father was Lieutenant Colonel Thomas Donnelly of the Royal Garrison Artillery.

Donnelly married Brigadier Thomas Frederick James Collins in 1942; he was the Director of Movements for Continental Operations for Operation Overlord in the build-up to D-Day. She died on 17 June 1992, at the age of 75.
