= Canadian Medical Association Journal =

Peer-reviewed general medical journal

- Discipline: Medicine
- Language: English, French
- Edited by: Kirsten Patrick

Publication details
- History: 1911–present
- Publisher: Canadian Medical Association (Canada)
- Frequency: Monthly
- Open access: Yes
- License: CC BY
- Impact factor: 14.6 (2022)

Standard abbreviations
- ISO 4: Can. Med. Assoc. J.

Indexing
- ISSN: 0820-3946 (print); 1488-2329 (web)
- LCCN: 87039047
- OCLC no.: 12748813

Links
- Journal homepage; Online access; Online archive

The Canadian Medical Association Journal (French: Journal de l'Association Médicale Canadienne) is a peer-reviewed open-access general medical journal published by the Canadian Medical Association. It publishes original clinical research, analyses and reviews, news, practice updates, and editorials.

== Notable articles ==
The journal has published the following notable articles:

1. Banting and Best's 1922 report, "Pancreatic extracts in the treatment of diabetes mellitus". Banting and Macleod were awarded a Nobel Prize for the discovery of insulin in 1923.
2. 1926 – the first use of liver as a treatment for anemia, which led to the isolation of vitamin B12.
3. 1938 – CMAJ warns about the relationship between sun exposure and skin cancer.
4. 2003 – CMAJ responds rapidly to SARS (severe acute respiratory syndrome), publishing timely information during the outbreak.
5. 2009 – CMAJ publishes a research paper on the increased risk of reinfarction associated with proton pump inhibitors and clopidogrel, which has been widely cited and generated related research studies on the topic.

== CMAJ Open ==
CMAJ Open, an online open-access offshoot established in January 2013 with Diane Kelsall as its editor-in-chief, has an open peer-review system which makes reviewer comments, author responses, and previous versions available online along with the final versions of contributions.

== History ==
A prime mover behind establishment of the Canadian Medical Association Journal was Andrew Macphail, chair of the history of medicine at McGill University and editor of the Montreal Medical Journal. At the Canadian Medical Association's 1907 annual meeting held in Montreal, "Macphail argued that without a journal to express its views and record its proceedings the association would have little impact", and was successful in getting a clause urging the founding of a journal put into the CMA constitution. At the 1910 meeting an executive report was adopted urging immediate steps to found a journal. Macphail was appointed the first editor.

The Montreal Medical Journal was acquired, and the Maritime Medical News agreed to suspend publication. The first issue of the new Canadian Medical Association Journal was published in January 1911. In 1913, for the first time, the journal showed a profit, which was sufficient to liquidate the previous deficit. Subscriptions had increased 60% over the 1911 level and were being purchased by 20% of Canadian doctors.

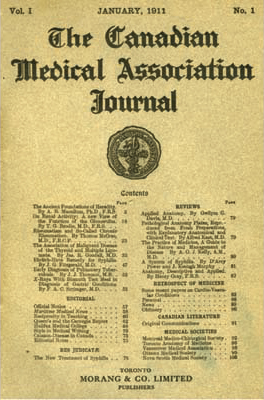
First issue of Canadian Medical Association Journal, January 1911

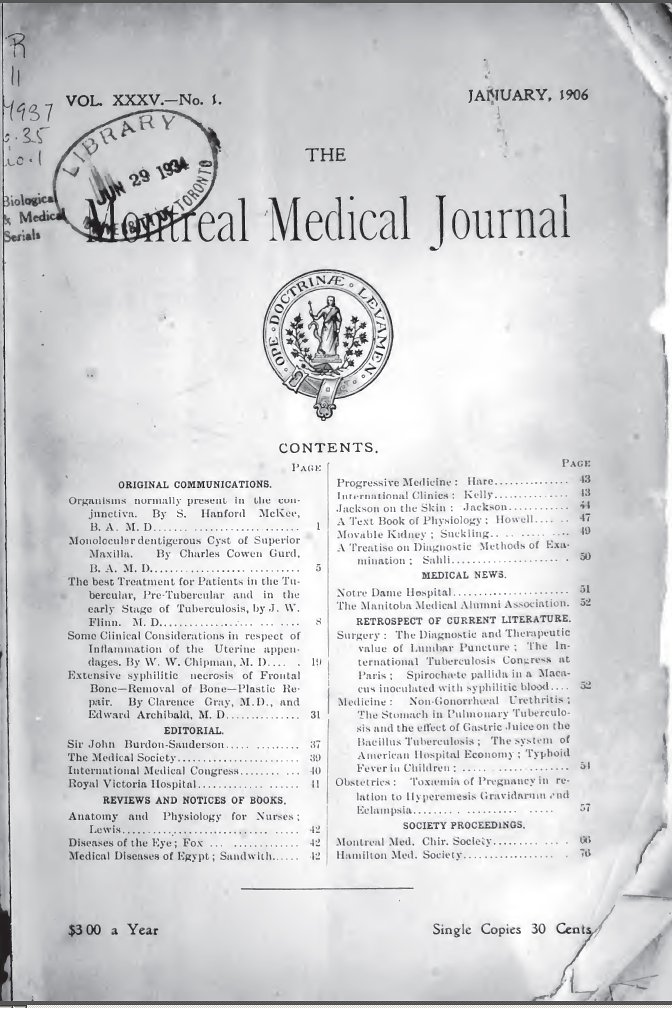
Montreal Medical Journal, January 1906.

On February 20, 2006, the editor-in-chief, John Hoey, was fired over an editorial independence dispute with the then owners of the journal, CMA Media. The journal sent 13 women to buy the emergency contraceptive levonorgestrel (Plan B) over-the-counter in pharmacies across Canada and reported their experiences. The pharmacists asked them for personal data, including the women's names, addresses, dates of last menstrual period, when they had unprotected sex, customary method of birth control, and reason for dispensing the medication. This was at the recommendation of the Canadian Pharmacists Association, which also advised members to store the information permanently in their computers. The Canadian Women's Health Network said that collecting this information was unnecessary and a violation of privacy. The Canadian Pharmacists Association complained to the Canadian Medical Association, demanding that the names of the pharmacists be removed from the article. The Canadian Medical Association ordered the journal to comply. The Canadian Medical Association then fired Hoey, without giving a reason.

On February 28, 2006, the acting-editor, Stephen Choi and editorial fellow Sally Murray, resigned from the journal over the same reason, leaving it without any full-time editorial staff, which raised questions about the future of the publication. In January 2007, Paul Hebert became editor-in-chief. After completion of Hebert's term, John Fletcher became editor-in-chief in January 2012.

In April 2007, the former staff launched a new open-access journal, Open Medicine.

On February 29, 2016, a similar controversy re-surfaced as the Canadian Medical Association disbanded the CMAJ's Journal Oversight Committee and dismissed editor-in-chief John Fletcher. The CMA cited a falling impact factor and a decline in research submissions as reasons for the change, but these claims are disputed. Diane Kelsall, a long-time CMAJ deputy editor, became interim editor-in-chief while the organization searched for a permanent replacement.

In December 2021, CMAJ published a letter that said the hijab was "an instrument of oppression". After the letter was criticized as Islamophobic, CMAJ apologized and retracted the letter.

James Maskalyk became the executive editor-in-chief in 2022.

== See also ==
- Canadian Family Physician
