= The Bass Rock =

2020 novel by Evie Wyld

- First edition (UK)
- Author: Evie Wyld
- Language: English
- Publisher: Jonathan Cape (UK); Random House (AUS); Pantheon Books (US)
- Publication date: 2020
- Publication place: United Kingdom
- Media type: Print
- Pages: 362

The Bass Rock is the third novel by English author Evie Wyld, published in 2020. It won the Stella Prize in 2021.

== Plot ==
The novel is set for the most part in North Berwick opposite the eponymous Bass Rock in the Firth of Forth in Scotland, where three women are linked across the centuries, Sarah, Ruth and Viv. The novel is divided into a prologue and seven parts. Each part is made up of five palindromic chapters (I – II – III – II – I), with the Sarah segment at the centre bookended by Ruth's story and, at the outer ends, Viv's narrative. Interspersed in the narrative are brief vignettes, portraying violence against women.

Sarah a teenager, is accused of being a witch in the 1700s and is in danger of being burnt alive. She is then rescued by a priest's family, narrated by Joseph their son, and they take her away from the village towards the coast.

Ruth moves into a new house after the Second World War and has married cruel and manipulative widower Peter with his two sons Michael and Christopher. Ruth mourns for her brother who died in the war, and also has suspicions about her husband's frequent work trips by train to London. The housekeeper Betty's niece Bernadette moves in and becomes close to Michael and Christopher. The Reverend Jon Brown appears to have an unhealthy interest in Michael and Christopher and tragedy befalls him, as Ruth's mental state is parlous.

Viviane, a contemporary narrator is a fortyish woman with a history of alcoholism and mental illness and has been given the task of clearing her grandmother Ruth's house. Her uncle Christopher's half-sister estate-agent Deborah keeps showing up to make the house more presentable. Her sister's marriage is breaking up and so Katherine moves into the house with Viv. Part time sex-worker and witch Maggie also moves in, who can sense the presences in the house, and is obsessed by violence to women.

== Critical reception ==
Justine Jordan, writing in The Guardian, writes that the "novel is a complex, searingly controlled catalogue of male violence against women, set across three time frames on the coast of Scotland... The elegant patterning of the novel's structure and the delicate links between the three narrative threads stand in contrast to the brutal material... the novel is also psychologically fearless and, in Viviane's sections, bitterly funny. Wyld is a genius of contrasting voices and revealed connections, while her foreshadowings are so subtle that the book demands – and eminently repays – a second read."

Yvonne C. Garrett in The Brooklyn Rail also praises the novel: "Wyld's descriptions of the shadowed interiors of the house and the vast rocky beaches with the Bass Rock and its lighthouse bring great depth to the novel. The descriptions, at times, are so powerful that you'll have to remind yourself you're not on the coast of Scotland walking in the freezing rain. The setting is, of course, perfect for this tale of generational violence and deeply wrought dread. But this is not simply a gothic novel or a catalogue of horrors, there are moments of deep tenderness between parents and children, between women, and even a few good laughs (particularly in the interactions between Viv and a distantly related real estate agent). The novel ends with a stunning resolution but also a deeply sad explanation of the body in the suitcase. It is an ending both transcendent and horrifically real: this is a book that men need to read; we women, we already know, but we should read it too."

Stuart Kelly, writing in The Scotsman: "Certain images chime, or rather toll, over the centuries: stinkhorns, pineapples, pet dogs, quite a lot of rotting flesh and oddly enough 300 years of poor cuisine in Scotland. Many readers will be familiar with this kind of genealogical Chinese box, and will quickly predict what happens next in terms of atmosphere... The twist, the lure, of the book is made explicit in a speech given by a quirky woman, Maggie, whom Viv meets in the present and who seems a fey if earthy presence. Over wine and cigarettes she gives a genuine polemic about “forgetting, it’s about the vast and infinite amnesia. We forget the torture, the rape, the tit rippers, the scold’s bridles, the loss one by one of our fingernails, then fingers”. It is an unremitting and necessarily uncomfortable speech about misogyny not being an aberration, but an endemic and underlying fact of the way the world is and has been. Wyld lures the reader into what might have been any other split-time frame, slightly quirky novel and then lets rip. As the men lure the women, the writer lures the reader."

John Williams in The New York Times is generally positive: "The Bass Rock is that potentially dreadful thing, a timely novel, though its subject — the violence men inflict against women — is evergreen. And the perennial nature of that terror is very intentionally reflected in the book's structure, which shuffles between three historical periods... All of this makes the book sound awfully grim, but the experience of reading it isn't. The message it leaves you with — down to its expertly chilling final line — is certainly dark. But in delivering it, Wyld consistently entertains, juggling the pleasures of several different genres. There's something alchemical in the way that, with hardly a clumsy step, she draws on elements of eerie natural horror... There are literal ghosts in this book — the spirits of wronged girls and women. And if, toward the end, I felt that the novel's spectral elements simmered on a heat that could be lowered by 20 percent or so, that's simply personal taste. Wyld essentially pulls it off, the way she pulls off nearly everything".

The novel was listed among 2020's best books by Vogue.

== Awards ==
The Bass Rock was shortlisted for the Christina Stead Prize for Fiction and won the Stella Prize in 2021.
