= Stephen Brown (playwright) =

British playwright

Stephen Brown is best known as a playwright, but has also been a publisher and writer.

== Life and career ==
Brown was educated at Jesus College, Cambridge, and the University of Sussex.

He was the publisher of Prospect magazine, and has reviewed theatre for Radio 4's Front Row, the Times Literary Supplement and others.

In 2003, he wrote the script for Filter Theatre's Faster, based on the James Gleick book of the same name. After running at the Battersea Arts Centre and Lyric Theatre, Hammersmith, this production toured nationally and internationally.

In 2007, his play Future Me, which dramatised the prison treatment of a successful lawyer convicted of sex offences, was produced at Theatre503 in Battersea. It was subsequently produced in Berkeley and New York, and toured England with Coronation Street's Rupert Hill.

He was subsequently commissioned by the Royal National Theatre to write a play about René Descartes, and to adapt Occupational Hazards, Rory Stewart's memoir of his experiences as a senior coalition official in Iraq. This latter work was produced at the Hampstead Theatre in May 2017.

In summer 2020, the Bristol Old Vic was scheduled to premiere his new play, Dr Semmelweis, modelled on the Hungarian physician, written with and starring Mark Rylance. The premiere was postponed due to COVID-19. It was eventually premiered in January 2022 and scheduled to run until February 5. After selling out and receiving positive reviews, its run was extended to 19 February. A West End run of Dr Semmelweis opened at the Harold Pinter Theatre in June 2023, again to critical acclaim with Mark Rylance in the title role.

== Books ==
- Future Me (Oberon, 2007)
- Occupational Hazards (Oberon, 2017)
