= The Places in Between =

2004 book by Rory Stewart

- Cover of 2005 Picador ed.
- Author: Rory Stewart
- Language: English
- Genre: Travel narrative
- Publisher: Picador
- Publication date: 4 June 2004
- Publication place: United Kingdom
- ISBN: 0330486330
- Followed by: Occupational Hazards

The Places in Between is a travel narrative by Rory Stewart, a British writer, academic, broadcaster, former diplomat and Member of Parliament, detailing his solo walk across north-central Afghanistan in 2002.

== Synopsis ==
Stewart arrives in Afghanistan in January 2002, beginning his journey in Herat and proceeding on foot to Kabul. He is initially accompanied by two armed guards, Qasim and Abdul Haq, at the insistence of Governor Yuzufi but travels without human company for most of his walk, accompanied only by his dog, Babur. On his journey, Stewart encounters many of Afghanistan's most notable historical sites, including the Minaret of Jam, the Dome of Chist-e-Sharif and the Buddhas of Bamiyan, which were destroyed by the Taliban. Afghanistan is particularly hazardous during the winter and, while walking across landscape covered by nine feet of snow, he was physically assaulted and shot at by humans, and also attacked by wolves.

Stewart's account of seeing the Minaret of Jam was of significant, wider importance. Prior to his visit, it was uncertain whether the tower was still standing. The Society for the Preservation of Afghanistan's Cultural Heritage had not heard a reliable report on its condition for some eight months, and there were concerns that the Taliban might have blown it up, as they did with the Bamiyan Buddhas. Though Stewart found the Minaret still standing, he encountered villagers who were conducting excavations of what they believed to be the lost city of the Turquoise Mountain, selling their finds to traders from Herat. Upon his return to the United Kingdom, Stewart contacted UNESCO to try to inform them of the scale of the damage being done by these unauthorised excavations, and confronted Professor Andrea Bruno at the British Museum in Bloomsbury in an attempt to raise awareness of its looting. He writes that he "was told that an archaeologist would begin work on the site in April 2003, sixteen months after my visit and long after the villagers had removed everything they could". An account of his visit to the Minaret was published in The New York Times in August 2002.

Stewart's travels roughly mirror those of Babur, the first Emperor of Mughal India, and quotes from his diary occur throughout the book.

== Reception ==
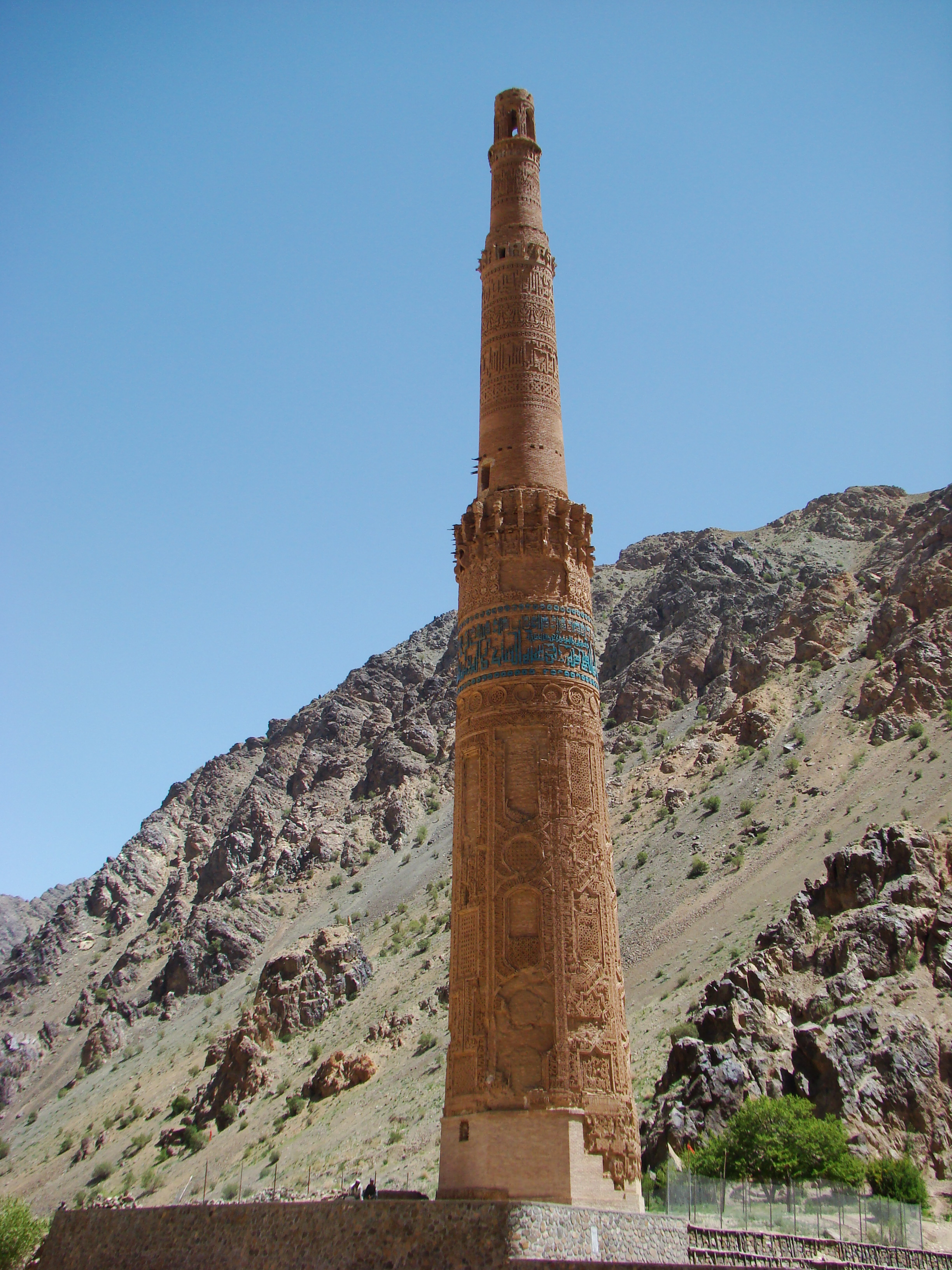
The Minaret of Jam

The Places in Between was critically applauded, winning the Royal Society of Literature Ondaatje Prize, a Scottish Arts Council prize and the Spirit of Scotland Award in 2005. It was short-listed for The Guardian First Book Award and the John Llewlyn Rhys Prize. The New York Times named it one of the top-ten books of 2006, a distinction the newspaper rarely gives to travel books. It was a New York Times bestseller for thirteen weeks and has been translated into nine languages.

== Publication ==
The book was first published as a hardcover by Picador in the UK on 4 June 2004 (ISBN 0330486330). A second revised edition was published as a paperback in the UK on 1 April 2005 (ISBN 0330486349). On 8 May 2006, a further revised American paperback edition was published by Harvest Books (ISBN 0156031566). An audio recording was made in 2006 narrated by Rory Stewart while he was in Kabul and published by Recorded Books (ISBN 1428116702), based on the Harvest Books edition.

== Adaptation ==
The Places in Between was dramatised by writer Benjamin Yeoh in a 45-minute radio play of the same name directed by Steven Canny, first broadcast on BBC Radio 4's Afternoon Play on 15 February 2007. The play was the radio pick of the day in both The Guardian and The Times.
