= Open Medicine (John Willinsky journal) =

- Discipline: Medicine
- Language: English
- Edited by: Anita Palepu

Publication details
- History: 2007-2014
- Publisher: John Willinsky (Canada)
- Frequency: Quarterly
- Open access: Yes
- License: Creative Commons Attribution Share-alike 2.5 License

Standard abbreviations
- ISO 4: Open Med.

Indexing
- ISSN: 1911-2092
- OCLC no.: 123294121

Links
- Journal homepage; Online archive

Open Medicine was a peer-reviewed open-access medical journal established in April 2007 by former editors from the Canadian Medical Association Journal. In 2014, the editor-in-chief was Anita Palepu from the University of British Columbia and the publisher was John Willinsky. The journal ceased publishing in November 2014, with the editors citing limited funding as among the reasons for the closure. The journal was abstracted and indexed in MEDLINE/PubMed. All content is archived on PubMed Central.
