= Maidens' Trip =

1948 autobiography by Emma Smith

- First edition
- Author: Emma Smith
- Language: English
- Publisher: Putnam & Company
- Publication date: 11 Aug 1948
- Publication place: United Kingdom
- Followed by: A Far Cry

Maidens' Trip is a 1948 autobiography by Emma Smith based on her experiences as a volunteer boatwoman on Britain's Grand Union Canal during the Second World War. It won the John Llewellyn Rhys Prize for 1949.

== Background ==
In 1943 Emma Smith (then known as Elspeth Hallsmith) joined the Grand Union Canal Carrying Company under their wartime scheme of employing women to replace men who had gone off to fight. Freed from a middle-class background, Emma and her new workmates joined the boating fraternity and learned how to handle a pair of 72 ft long canal boats, carrying cargoes of steel and coal north from London to Birmingham and Coventry.

== Radio and television ==
In 1968 Smith's book was serialised on the BBC's Woman's Hour and read by Miriam Margolyes. A decade later it was adapted as a 3-part television serial, produced by the BBC (Birmingham) and broadcast in 1977. It starred Tina Heath, Liz Bagley, Tricia George and John Salthouse and was directed by Moira Armstrong.
