= Emma Smith (author) =

English novelist and children's writer (1923–2018)

- Born: Elspeth Hallsmith; 21 August 1923
- Died: 24 April 2018 (aged 94); Putney, London
- Occupation: Novelist
- Spouse: Richard Stewart-Jones
- Children: Barnaby and Lucy Rose
- Writing career
- Language: English
- Years active: 1940s – 2010s
- Genres: Biography, Children's
- Notable works: Maidens' Trip, The Far Cry
- Notable awards: John Llewellyn Rhys Prize

Emma Smith (21 August 1923 – 24 April 2018) was an English novelist, who also wrote for children and published two volumes of autobiography. She gave encouragement to Laurie Lee while he was writing his bestselling memoir of his childhood, Cider with Rosie.

== Early life and fame ==
Smith was born as Elspeth Hallsmith in Cornwall, daughter of a bank clerk, Guthrie Hallsmith, D.S.O. and his wife Janet, a nurse. Her father suffered a nervous breakdown and left the family, after which Smith only saw him three more times in his life. She received a "negligible" private education up to the age of 16, when she decided to take up a job at the War Office. During the Second World War, she volunteered to work on the canals as a boatswoman. Later on, her experiences as a trainee boatswoman on the Grand Union Canal would become the basis for her debut novel, Maidens' Trip.

In September 1946, Smith, still only 23, went off to India with a team of documentary film-makers that included the poet Laurie Lee, who served as the scriptwriter on the team. During the trip, Cider with Rosie, Lee's classic account of growing up in rural Gloucestershire, was in its embryonic stages. Emma Smith was one of those who would later encourage Lee to complete what became one of the best loved accounts of childhood in English literature.

After nine months in India, Smith returned to England in 1947 and set down to write her first book. Maidens' Trip (1948) proved to be a critical and a commercial success and won the John Llewellyn Rhys Prize. With the proceeds from it, she moved to Paris, where she took a room in the Hotel de Tournon, and drawing on her memories of India, typed up her second novel. It was reprinted by Bloomsbury in 2011. It was while working on her second novel in Paris in 1948 that Smith was photographed with her typewriter on the quay at the Ile de la Cité by the French street photographer Robert Doisneau, who was commissioned by Paris Match. After it had appeared in the magazine, Doisneau continued to use the photograph in his collections.

The Far Cry was published in 1949 to even greater acclaim and republished in 2002 by Persephone Books. The tale of a young English girl and her cantankerous father travelling together through India, it was awarded the James Tait Black Memorial Prize for fiction in 1949, and later reissued in a Penguin edition.

== Later life ==
In 1951, Smith married Richard Stewart-Jones, who worked for the National Trust, within four weeks of meeting him. However, he died of a heart attack six years later, leaving her with two young children and some heavily mortgaged houses in Chelsea. She then moved to Radnorshire in rural Wales to raise her children.

Her writing took a back seat to her family duties. Only very slowly did she return to writing. She produced several children's books, as well as a novel, The Opportunity of a Lifetime, in 1978. But she never regained the celebrity she had enjoyed in the late 1940s. The specialist canal book publisher M. & M. Baldwin pioneered the revival of interest in Emma Smith's work, by republishing her award-winning Maidens' Trip in 1987 and keeping it in print for many years.

The novelist Susan Hill has been instrumental in a recent revival of interest in Emma Smith's works. In 1978, many years after The Far Cry had gone out of print, Hill found a copy in a jumble sale and wrote enthusiastically of her discovery in The Daily Telegraph. In 2002 – 50 years after the Penguin edition – Persephone Books reprinted The Far Cry as one of a series of forgotten classics by women writers. Hill supplied the afterword to that edition.

After 1980, Emma Smith lived in Putney in south-west London.

In 2008, Smith returned to writing with a memoir, The Great Western Beach, describing her childhood in Cornwall between the two World Wars. Bloomsbury Publishing, its publishers, went on to republish Maidens' Trip in 2009. The success of her first memoir led Bloomsbury Publishing to encouraged her to write a sequel. This appeared as As Green As Grass in 2013, and covered her life between 1935, when she left Newquay at the age of 12, to 1951 when she married.

Emma Smith died peacefully in Putney on 24 April 2018, at the age of 94.

== Published works ==
=== Novels ===
- The Far Cry (1949)
- The Opportunity of a Lifetime (1978)

=== Autobiography ===
- Maidens' Trip (1948)
- The Great Western Beach: A Memoir of a Cornish Childhood Between the Wars (2008)
- As Green as Grass: Growing Up Before, During & After the Second World War (2013)

=== Children's books ===
- Emily, The Travelling Guinea Pig (1959)
- Out of Hand (1963)
- Emily's Voyage (1966)
- No Way of Telling (1972)

=== Uncollected short stories ===
- A Surplus of Lettuces (1977)
- Mackerel (1984)

=== Non-fiction ===
- Village Children: A Soviet Experience (1982)
