= The Mechanics' Institute Review =

- Language: English

Publication details
- Publisher: Birkbeck, University of London

Standard abbreviations
- ISO 4: Mech.' Inst. Rev.

The Mechanics' Institute Review (also known by the abbreviation MIR) is an annual literary anthology published by Birkbeck, University of London, as part of its MA Creative Writing course. The MIR Project Director is Julia Bell.

== History ==
The publication owes its name to the institution that publishes the title, Birkbeck, University of London. The first Mechanics' Institute in London was founded in 1823 by George Birkbeck. "Mechanics" then meant "skilled artisans", and the purpose of the institute was to instruct them in the principles behind their craft.

The first MIR was published in 2004. Originally limited to MA students' short stories and novel extracts, MIR has also included work by notable published authors, from Issue 3 onwards. These include Ali Smith, Toby Litt, Rose Tremain, Joyce Carol Oates, T. C. Boyle, Dubravka Ugrešić, Courttia Newland, Chimamanda Ngozi Adichie, Peter Ho Davies, Jean McNeil and David Foster Wallace.

Reviews of the magazine have been published in the TES and The Guardian newspaper.

== Issues ==
=== Issue 1 ===
ISBN 0-9547933-0-7, Published in 2004, Introduction by Jonathan Coe.

Editors: Lamya Al-Khraisha, Sally Hinchcliffe, Alessandra Sartore, Amanda Schiff, Sue Tyley, Cathy Wasson and Rachel Wright.

Contributors: Lamya Turki Hadeetha Al-Khraisha, Heidi Amsinck, Jonathan Catherall, Tamsin Cottis, Paul Daly, Liz Fremantle, Nadine Grieve, Sally Hinchcliffe, Alison Huntington, Anne Koch, Basil Lawrence, Matthew Loukes, Michael Mayhew, Helen Pike, Alessandra Sartore, Amanda Schiff, Sue Tyley, Sophie Warne, Cathy Wasson, William Weinstein, Heather Williams and Rachel Wright.

=== Issue 2 ===
ISBN 0-9547933-2-3, Published in 2005, Introduction by Sarah Waters.

Editors: Heidi Amsinck, Mary-Louise Buxton, Tamsin Cottis, Nadine Grieve, Rebekah Lattin-Rawstrone, Basil Lawrence, Shaun Levin, Frances Merivale, Mihaela Nicolescu, Nii Ayikwei Parkes and William Weinstein.

Contributors: Niki Aguirre, Caroline Annis, Mary-Louise Buxton, Gail Campbell, Vittorio D'Alessio, Rowena Dunn, Nicola Field, Sam Hudson, Rebekah Lattin-Rawstrone, Shaun Levin, Sara Macintosh, Alison Heathwood McCormack, Frances Merivale, Katie Morris, Mihaela Nicolescu, Allia Oswald, Nii Parkes, Nina Robertson, Patti Webb, Laura Weinert and Harry Whitehead.

=== Issue 3 ===
ISBN 0-9547933-3-1, Published in September 2006 Introduction by Julia Bell.

Editors: John Braime, Jonathan Catherall, Christine Hsu, Amy Popovich, Laura Peters and Victor Schonfeld.

Contributors: Lisa Appignanesi, Neil Baker, T. Coraghessan Boyle, John Braime, Jonathan Catherall, Dorothy Crossan, Harriet Fisher, Grahame Gladin, Emma Henderson, Christine Hsu, Mariko Iwasaki, Kavita Jindal, Jamie Joseph, Sarah Jane Marshall, Courttia Newland, Christina Papamichael, Laura Peters, Amy Popovich, Kate Pullinger, Robert Royston, Lenya Samanis, Victor Schonfeld, Franca Torrano, Dubravka Ugrešić and Maggie Womersley.

=== Issue 4 ===
ISBN 978-0-9547933-4-0, Published in September 2007 Introduction by Joyce Carol Oates

Editors: Gabriela Blandy, Jill McGivering, Jennifer Payne, Elizabeth Sarkany, James Vincent

Contributors: David Bezmozgis, Danny Birchall, Gabriela Blandy, Nadia Crandal, Zoe Fairbairns, Tom Gauld, Jaime Hernandez, Parselelo Kantai, Rohan Kar, Nik Korpon, Jill McGivering, Jennifer Payne, Samanthi Perera, T. Rawson, Lucy Roeber, Rosie Rogers, Paul Ryan, Elizabeth Sarkany, Michelle Singh, David John Soulsby, Rose Tremain, James Vincent, David Foster Wallace, Hilary Wilce and Laura Williams.

=== Issue 5 ===
ISBN 978-0-9547933-5-7, Published in September 2008 Introduction by Susan Elderkin.

Editors: Pippa Griffin, Keith Jarrett, Cynthia Langley, Philip Makatrewicz, Josh Raymond

Contributors: Thea Bennett, Gul Y. Davis, Jon Elsom, Albert Garcia, Pippa Griffin, Anupama Kumari Gohel, Anna Hope, Alison Huntington, J. D. Keith, Olja Knežević, Cynthia Medford Langley, Toby Litt, Philip Makatrewicz, Paul Martin, Josh Raymond, Sarah Salway, Thomas Jerome Seabrook, Ali Smith, Melissa de Villiers, Matthew Weait.

=== Issue 6 ===
ISBN 978-0-9547933-6-4, Published in September 2009 Introduction by Jean McNeil

Editors: S. J. Ahmed, Ingrid Glienke, Jacqueline Haskell, Caroline Macaulay, Tamara Pollock, Deirdre Shanahan, Sarah Walcott

Contributors: David Savill, M. L. Stedman, Chimamanda Ngozi Adichie, Anna Baggaley, Emily Cleaver, Maggie Womersley, Anna Ackland, Sue Gedge, Peter Ho Davies, Graham Hodge, Richard English, Mary Irene Masaba, Josh Raymond, Moira Sharpe, David Queva, Russell Celyn Jones, Joanna Ingham, Chris Lilly, Kavita Jindal, Richard Milward, Margi Williams, Jon Elsom, Carol Wong, Lesley Saunders, Thea Bennett, K. K. Dayal.

=== Issue 7 ===
ISBN 978-0954793371, Published in September 2010 Introduction by John Ralston Saul

Editors: Farzana Ahmad, Alan Baban, Valeria Melchioretto, Catherine O'Connor, Esther Poyer, Rhiannon Smith, Rachel Withers

Contributors: Jules Grant, Felicity Francis, George Lewkowicz, Laura Tapsfield, Stephen J. Vowles, David Foster Wallace, Daniel Bourke, S.J Ahmed, Barbara Bleiman, Xavier Leret, Salena Godden, John Lucas, Elizabeth Sarkany, Liz Fremantle, Sadie McKenzie, Cordelia Feldman, Aaron Cox, Bernardine Evaristo, Nicholas Hogg, Charlie Fish, Hannah Parry, Tamara Pollock, Katherine Woodrow.

=== Issue 8 ===
ISBN 978-0954793388, Published in September 2011 Introduction by E. E. Cummings

Editors: Greta Burgio, Anna Corbett, Miguel Fernandes, Ceia Emma Lever, Megan Orpwood-Russell, Samira Salihu, Veena Sharma.

Contributors: Fiona Melrose, Tray Butler, Daniel Bourke, Chris Adrian, Xavier Leret, David Peter Burns, Karin Salvalaggio, Tim Graves, Kevin Barry, Maggie Womersley, Rosie Allabarton, Charlotte Beeston, Barbara Bleiman, Damien Doorley, John Lucas, Anna Baggaley, Julius Pasteiner, Mary Bracht, Thaddeus Hickman, Amit Chaudhuri, Kirty Topiwala, Tanya Datta, Mihaela Nicolescu, Genevieve Herr, Louise Lee.

=== Issue 9 ===
ISBN 978-0954793395, Published in September 2012 Illustrations by Lucy Jones

Editors: Sue Betney, Dane Buckley, Sarah Cumming, Natalie Fletcher, Marlowe Harris, Zoë Ranson, Antonia Reed.

Contributors: Terence James Eeles, Jamie M-Richards, Phoebe Blatton, Lucy Hume, Jenn Ashworth, Paul Flack, Julia Bell, Susan Greenhill, Phil Gilbert, Veena Sharma, Rachel Withers, Alison MacLeod, Jack Wilkes, Tanya Datta, Erinn Kindig, Thaddeus Hickman, Chris Lilly, Nick Alexander, Victoria Grigg, M. J. Whistler, Nadim Safdar, Maggie Womersley, Alexander Knights.

=== Issue 10 ===
ISBN 978-0957583306, Published in September 2013 Introduction by Russell Celyn Jones

Senior Editor: Sue Tyley

Editors: Ravinder Basra, Mary Bracht, Stephanie Cooper, Pamela Gough, Ian McNab, Angela Shoosmith.

Contributors: Kavita Jindal, Charlie Fish, Lucy Hume, Gaylene Gould, Adam Marek, Gemma Thomas, Amanda Crane, Lenya Samanis, Amy Bird, Rebekah Lin, Colin Grant, Maddy Reid, Fiona Melrose, Dave Wakely, Barbara Bleiman, Jackie Kay, Desmond Byrne, Joel Pearcey, Louise Christian, Jacquelyn Shreeves-Lee, Evie Wyld, Julius Pasteiner, Sarah Alexander, Maggie Womersley, Amanda Schiff.

Celebrating 10 years of The Mechanic's Institute Review.

=== Issue 11 ===
ISBN 978-0957583320, Published in September 2014 Introduction by Julia Bell

Editors: Erica Duggan, Kate Smalley Ellis, Kieran Falconer, Alison Hitchcock, Heidi Midtun Larsen, Rebekah Lin, Luke Terry.

Contributors: Jennifer Whitehead, Sara Keene, Walter Jones, Melanie Jones, Dave Wakely, Hari Kunzru, Angela Shoosmith, Martin Bryant, Len Lukowski, Talim Arab, Dave McGowan, Paul Flack, Desmond Byrne, Vanessa MacDonald, Rebecca Rouillard, Mary Bracht, Julia Gray, Josh Raymond, Jacquelyn Shreeves-Lee, Sonya Oldwin, Antonia Reed, Angela Wray, Alex Preston, Kate Whiteside, James Mitchell.

=== Issue 14 ===
ISBN 978-0957583382, Published in September 2017 Foreword by Julia Bell

Editors: Sarah Alexander, Kate Ellis, Caroline Macauley, Paola Moretti, Tamara Pollock, Miranda Roszkowski, Rebecca Rouillard, Katherine Vik.

Contributors: Anna Pook, Alan Beard, Charlie Fish, Keith Jarrett, Grace Jacobson, Gilli Fryzer, Sogol Sur, Elinor Johns, Stephanie Hutton, Gemma Weekes, Kev Pick, Madeline Cross, Bridget Westaway, Leila Segal, Ellen Hardy, Amy J. Kirkwood, Sarah Evans, Jenn Ashworth, Reshma Ruia, Sarah Hegarty, Jo Holloway, Katiw Winfield, Dane Buckley, Yom Heaton, Ruth Ivo, James Wise.

=== Issue 16 ===
The Climate Issue, Autumn 2019

Managing Editor: Sye Tyley

Contributors: Julia Bell, Richard Hamblyn, Emma Hutton, Rachel Bower, Katie Willis, Arhonndia, Hannah Austin, Rushika Wick, Tarquin Landseer, Carol Caffrey, Louisa Armitage, Season Butler, Dave Wakely, Kate Noakes, Alexandra Petropoulos, Shauna Mackay, Elizabeth Baines, Diego Ferrari, Sarah Barr, Laura Lewis-Waters, M.W. Bewick, Reena Dennhardt, Joshua Southern, Valentine Carter, Andrew Leach, Carmel Shortall, Fran Lock, Judy Darley, Jean McNeil, Emily Hinshelwood, Ronan Fitzgerald, Lawrence Illsley, Lorraine Wilson, K.M.Elkes
