= Dolapo =

Dolapo is a given name. Notable people with the name include:

- Dolapo Badmos, Nigerian police officer
- Dolapo 'LowlaDee' Adeleke (born 1990), Nigerian filmmaker
- Dolapo Oni, Nigerian actress and media personality
- Dolapo Osinbajo (born 1967), Nigerian lawyer and political figure
