= Llop =

Llop is a surname literally meaning "wolf" in Catalan; it was originally a given name in Catalonia. Notable people with the surname include:

- Francisco Masip Llop (1926–2015), Spanish cyclist
- José Carlos Llop (born 1956), Spanish writer
- Juan Manuel Llop (born 1963), Argentine football manager
- Pilar Llop (born 1973), Spanish judge and politician
- Ramón Rufat Llop (1916–1993), Spanish anarcho-syndicalist
- Roc Llop i Convalia (1908–1997), Catalan anarchist, teacher, and poet
- Roser Bru Llop (1923–2021), Spanish-born Chilean painter and engraver
