= African Writers' Evening =

Series of readings begun at Poetry Café, UK

The African Writers' Evening (AWE)is the first regular evening held for African writers at the UK's Poetry Café. It was started in 2003 by Nii Ayikwei Parkes in consultation with the directors of the Poetry Society after he completed a residency there. The solid reputation of African Writers' Evening is based on its ability to consistently identify and feature talented emerging writers.

Diana Evans and Hisham Matar, for example, were both featured prior to the official releases of their début publications, two of 2007's features, Ken Kamoche and Sade Adeniran, were shortlisted for the 2008 Commonwealth Prize for their first books, and Inua Ellams won an Edinburgh Festival Fringe First Award three years after his initial featured appearance at African Writers' Evening in 2006. The event's founder Nii Ayikwei Parkes was himself shortlisted for the 2010 Commonwealth Prize, and the November 2009 featured reader, Nadifa Mohamed won the 2010 Betty Trask Award.

African Writers' Evening is held bi-monthly from March to November with occasional special events, such as the AWE Heritage Series launched at the Southbank Centre on 6 July 2009 and AWE/NYC, which was held at the Bowery Club in September 2009. While the event is still held mainly at the Poetry Café in Covent Garden, a recent partnership with the Southbank Centre has seen the end-of-year reading in November held at the Royal Festival Hall since 2008.

== Policy ==
African Writers' Evening features writers of all genres and defines "African" based on lived experience rather than simplistic notions of heritage. Featured writers have included white writers such as Robyn Scott, Isobel Dixon and Gillian Slovo, as well as Africans of Indian origin such as Sharmila Chauhan.

== First event ==
The first African Writers' Evening was held in July 2003 at the Poetry Café and featured Nii Ayikwei Parkes (who was writer-in-residence at the venue), Jessica Horn, a Ugandan poet, and Abby Ajayi, a Nigerian-British short story and script writer. The event in its current format started in July 2004. Its tagline is: Where Africa speaks and the world listens.

== History and expansion ==
African Writers' Evening initially paid writers travel expenses and they read for free as a way of supporting the reading series. However, in September 2005, the series received funding from the Arts Council of England and began to pay the featured writers an appearance fee. This development allowed the series to begin flying writers in from abroad to share their work: Helon Habila's appearance at the Royal Festival Hall in 2009 was part of this trend.

Since the New York event held in September 2009, African Writers' Evening appears to be on a path of expansion and collaboration. In April 2010, they held an event in Birmingham in collaboration with The Drum Theatre, the British Council and London Book Festival and in July 2010 a book sale event, named the African Book Market was held at the Poetry Café in partnership with major publishers, such as Random House, as well as smaller outfits like Serpent's Tail. They also announced a book discussion initiative starting in September 2010.

== Organisation ==
The event is run by a London-based collective called London Society, Literature, Arts and Music Central, abbreviated as London SLAM Central.

== List of previous featured readers ==
Year	Month	Featured author(s)	Host	Venue
2004	July	Open Mike	Nii Ayikwei Parkes	Poetry Café
2004	September	Leeto Thale (South Africa)	Nii Ayikwei Parkes	Poetry Café
2004	November	Open Mike	Nii Ayikwei Parkes	Poetry Café
2005	March	Valerie Mason-John (Sierra Leone); Delia Jarrett-Macauley (Sierra Leone); Diana Omo Evans (Nigeria); Suzy Kester (Nigeria)	Kadija Sesay	Poetry Café
2005	May	Hisham Matar (Libya); Gamal Hassan (Egypt)	Nii Ayikwei Parkes	Poetry Café
2005	July	Sefi Atta (Nigeria)	aNii Ayikwei Parkes	Poetry Café
2005	September	Jack Mapanje (Malawi); Jesica Horn (Uganda); Akin Oladimeji (Nigeria)	Nii Ayikwei Parkes	Poetry Café
2005	November	Atukwei Okai (Ghana)	Reading cancelled due to missed flight	Poetry Café
2006	March	Nick Makoha (Uganda); Inua Ellams (Nigeria)	Nii Ayikwei Parkes	Poetry Café
2006	May	Helen Oyeyemi (Nigeria); Clara Bakosi (Nigeria); Louis Antwi (Ghana)	Nii Ayikwei Parkes	Poetry Café
2006	July	Hisham Matar (Libya); Jessica Horn (Uganda)	Nii Ayikwei Parkes	Poetry Café
2006	September	Wangui wa Goro (Kenya); Togara Muzanenhamo (Zimbabwe)	Nii Ayikwei Parkes	Poetry Café
2006	November	Brian Chikwava (Zimbabwe); Ghazi Gheblawi (Libya)	Nii Ayikwei Parkes	Poetry Café
2007	March	Kadija Sesay (Sierra Leone); Leeto Thale (South Africa)	Nii Ayikwei Parkes	Poetry Café
2007	May	Zoë Wicomb (South Africa); Sharmila Chauhan (Kenya/Zambia)	Nii Ayikwei Parkes	Poetry Café
2007	June	Special Event with Africa Beyond; Casey Abaraonye (Nigeria); Ken Kamoche (Kenya); Sade Adeniran (Nigeria)	Nii Ayikwei Parkes	Poetry Café
2007	July	Biyi Bandele (Nigeria)	Nii Ayikwei Parkes	Poetry Café
2007	September	Musa Okwonga (Uganda); Jessica Horn (Uganda); Chris Simpson (Rwanda)	Nick Makoha	Poetry Café
2007	November	Isobel Dixon (South Africa); Biram Mboob (Gambia)	Nii Ayikwei Parkes	Poetry Café
2008	March	Nii Ayikwei Parkes (Ghana)	Nick Makoha	Poetry Café
2008	May	Robyn Scott (Botswana)	Nii Ayikwei Parkes	Poetry Café
2008	June	Fifth Anniversary Event; Hisham Matar (Libya); Jennifer Makumbi (Uganda); Inua Ellams (Nigeria)	Nii Ayikwei Parkes	Royal Festival Hall
2008	July	Ghazi Gheblawi (Libya); Saradha Soobrayen (Mauritius)	Nii Ayikwei Parkes	Poetry Café
2008	September	Monica Arac de Nyeko (Uganda)	Nii Ayikwei Parkes	Poetry Café
2008	November	No Readers	Reading cancelled due to venue refurbishment	Poetry Café
2009	March	Brian Chikwava (Zimbabwe); Goretti Kyomuhendo (Uganda)	Nii Ayikwei Parkes	Poetry Café
2009	May	Yaba Badoe (Ghana); Uchenna Izundu (Nigeria)	Nii Ayikwei Parkes	Poetry Café
2009	July	Laila Lalami (Morocco); Sulaiman Addonia (Eritrea/Ethiopia)	Nii Ayikwei Parkes	Poetry Café
2009	July	AWE Heritage Series; Helon Habila (Nigeria); Cameron Duodu (Ghana)	Nii Ayikwei Parkes	Royal Festival Hall
2009	September	AWE New York; Mohammed Naseehu Ali (Ghana); Patrice Nganang (Cameroon)	Nii Ayikwei Parkes	Bowery Poetry Club
2009	September	(themed reading: New Work); Hisham Matar (Libya); Leeto Thale(South Africa)	Nii Ayikwei Parkes	Poetry Café
2009	November	Nadifa Mohamed (Somalia)	Nii Ayikwei Parkes	Royal Festival Hall
2010	March	Lola Jaye (Nigeria); Peter Kalu (Nigeria)	Kadija Sesay	Poetry Café
2010	April	Special Event: Personal or Political with British Council & London Book Fair; Achmat Dangor (South Africa); Gillian Slovo (South Africa); Brian Chikwava (Zimbabwe)	Leeto Thale	The Drum (Birmingham)
2010	July	African Book Market	N/A	Poetry Café
2010	September	Book Discussion; Bitter Leaf by Chioma Okereke	Minna Salami; Samuel Sabo	Poetry Café
2011	March	Nadifa Mohamed (Somalia) with Kayo Chingonyi and Luul Hussein	Nii Ayikwei Parkes	Royal Festival Hall
2011	May	Sefi Atta (Nigeria)	Nii Ayikwei Parkes	Poetry Café
2011	July	Special Event: The Bar in Fiction readings & discussion with audience Q&A Ben Okri (Nigeria); Sarah Ladipo Manyika (Nigeria)	Nii Ayikwei Parkes	Royal Festival Hall
2011	September	TBA	TBC	Poetry Café
2011	November	TBC	TBC	Royal Festival Hall
