= Criminal World =

Criminal World may refer to:

- "Criminal World", a song by Metro from Metro; covered by David Bowie for Let's Dance
- "Criminal World", a song by Simple Minds from Good News from the Next World
- "Criminal World", a song by Lightning Raiders

== See also ==
- My Criminal World, a novel by Henry Sutton (novelist)
