= Julia Bell =

Julia Bell may refer to:

- Julia Bell (geneticist) (1879–1979), English pioneer of eugenics and human genetics
- Julia Bell (author) (born 1971), British novelist and poet

== See also ==
- Julie Bell (born 1958), American artist
