= Prix Laure Bataillon =

French literary award

The Prix Laure Bataillon is a French literary award established in 1986 by the cities of Nantes and Saint-Nazaire to be given for the best work of fiction translated each year. It is awarded jointly to a foreign writer and their French language translator.

== History ==
Created in 1986 to recognise the "best work of fiction translated into French each year," the award was renamed for the Hispanic translator and literary critic, Laure Guille-Bataillon, translator of Julio Cortázar and a 1988 laureate of the prize, following her death in 1990. The International Writers and Translators Residence at Saint Nazaire has been the administrator of the prize since 1993. In 2003, another prize, the Laure-Bataillon Classic Prize (Prix Laure Bataillon Classique) — given to the translator of a deceased author or a classic work of literature — was introduced and has been awarded alongside the original Laure-Bataillon Prize since 2004. In 2017, the Prix Classique was renamed the Prix Bernard Hoepffner.

== Winners of the Prix Laure-Bataillon ==
The past winners of the Prix Laure-Bataillon include Nobel Prize laureates, Derek Walcott, Mo Yan, and Olga Tokarczuk.

Year	Author	Title	Original Language	Translator	Publisher
1986	Hugo Claus	Le Chagrin des Belges	Dutch	Alain Van Crugten	Julliard
1987	Giorgio Manganelli	Amour	Italian	Jean-Baptiste Para	Denoël
1988	Juan José Saer	L'Ancêtre	Spanish	Laure Bataillon	Flammarion
1989	Hartmut Lange	Le Récital suivi de La Sonate Waldstein	German	Bernard Kreiss	Fayard
1990	Bohumil Hrabal	Vends maison où je ne veux plus vivre	Czech	Claudia Ancelot	Laffont
1991	Bo Carpelan	Axel	Swedish	C.G. Bjurström et Lucie Albertini	Gallimard
1992	Josef Hiršal	Bohème, bohème	Czech	Erika Abrams	Albin Michel
1993	Gert Jonke	L'École du virtuose	German	Uta Müller et Denis Denjean	Verdier
1994	John Updike	Rabbit en paix	English	Maurice Rambaud	Gallimard
1995	Hans Magnus Enzensberger	Requiem pour une femme romantique	German	Georges Arès	Gallimard
1996	Giuseppe Longo	L'Acrobate	Italian	Jean Pastureau et Marie-Noëlle Pastureau	Éditions L'Arpenteur
1997	Bernhard Schlink	Le Liseur	German	Bernard Lortholary	Gallimard
1998	Sergio Ramírez	Le Bal des masques	Spanish	Claude Fell	Éditions Rivages
1999	W.G. Sebald	Les Émigrants	German	Patrick Charbonneau	Actes Sud
2000	Mo Yan	The Republic of Wine	Chinese	Noël Dutrait et Liliane Dutrait	Seuil
2001	Erri De Luca	Trois chevaux	Italian	Danièle Valin	Gallimard
2002	Derek Walcott	Une autre vie	English	Claire Malroux	Gallimard
2004	Vanghélis Hadziyannidis	Le Miel des anges	Modern Greek	Michel Volkovitch	Albin Michel
2005	Gamal Ghitany	Le Livre des illuminations	Arabic	Khaled Osman	Seuil
2006	Russell Banks	The Darling	English	Pierre Furlan	Actes Sud
2007	Cynthia Ozick	Les Papiers de Puttermesser	English	Agnès Desarthe	L'Olivier
2008	Vassili Golovanov	Éloges des voyages insensés	Russian	Hélène Châtelain	Verdier
2009	Duong Thu Huong	Au zénith	Vietnamese	Phuong Dang Tran	Sabine Wespieser
2010	Julián Ríos	Le Pont de l'Alma	Spanish	Geneviève Duchêne et Albert Bensoussan	Tristram
2011	Reinhard Jirgl	Renégat, roman du temps nerveux	German	Martine Remon	Quidam
2012	Peter Esterhazy	Pas question d'art	Hungarian	Agnès Jarfas	Gallimard
2013	Chrístos Chryssópoulos	Une lampe entre les dents, chronique athénienne	Modern Greek	Anne-Laure Brisac	Actes Sud
2014	Nii Ayikwei Parkes	Notre quelque part	English	Sika Fakambi	Zulma
2015	Rick Bass	Toute la terre qui nous possède	English	Aurélie Tronchet	Bourgois
2016	Gabriel Josipovici	Infini : L'histoire d'un moment	English	Bernard Hœpffner	Quidam
2017	José Carlos Llop	Solstice	Spanish	Edmond Raillard	Jacqueline Chambon
2018	Alan Moore	Jerusalem	English	Christophe Claro	Inculte
2019	Olga Tokarczuk	Les livres de Jacob	Polish	Maryla Laurent	Noir sur blanc
2021	Gonçalo M. Tavares	Le quartier, les messieurs	Portuguese	Dominique Nédellec	Viviane Hamy
2021	Miquel de Palol	Le testament d’Alceste	Catalan	François-Michel Durazzo	Zulma
2022	Josef Winkler	L’ukrainienne	German	Bernard Banoun	Verdier
2023	Laszlo Krasznahorkai	Baron Wenckheim est de retour	Hungarian	Joëlle Dufeuilly	Cambourakis
2024	Isabela Figueiredo	La grosse	Portuguese	João Viegas	Chandeigne

== Winners of the Prix Laure-Bataillon Classique ==
Year	Author	Title	Original Language	Translator	Publisher
2003	Ovid	Les Écrits érotiques	Latin	Danièle Robert	Actes Sud
2004	Thomas Browne	Pseudodoxia Epidemica	English	Bernard Hoepffner	José Corti
2005	Daniil Harms	Œuvres en prose et en vers	Russian	Yvan Mignot	Verdier
2006	Giacomo Leopardi	Zibaldone	Italian	Bertrand Schefer	Allia
2007	Giuseppe Tomasi di Lampedusa	Le Guépard	Italian	Jean-Paul Manganaro	Seuil
2008	Lucio Victorio Mansilla	Une excursion au pays des Ranqueles	Spanish	Odile Begué	Bourgois
2009	Miguel de Cervantes	Œuvres complètes	Spanish	Jean-Raymond Fanlo	Le Livre de Poche
2010	Robert Walser	Au bureau et Petite Prose	German	Marion Graf	Zoé
2011	Ingeborg Bachmann	La Trentième Heure	German	Marie-Simone Rollin	Seuil
2012	Isaac Babel	Œuvres complètes	Russian	Sophie Benech	Le Bruit du Temps
2014	Franz Michael Felder	Scènes de ma vie	German	Olivier Le Lay	Verdier
2015	Ken Kesey	Et quelquefois j'ai comme une grande idée	English	Antoine Cazé	Monsieur Toussaint Louverture
2016	Bruno Schulz	Récits du treizième mois	Polish	Alain Van Crugten	L'Âge d'homme
2017	Ovid	Les métamorphoses	Latin	Maris Cosnay	l'Ogre
2018	Laurence Sterne	Voyage sentimental	English	Guy Jouvet	Tristram
2019	Virgil	Les Géorgiques de Virgile	Latin	Frédéric Boyer	Gallimard
2021	Avrom Sutzkever	Heures rapiécées	Yiddish	Rachel Ertel	L'Éclat
2022	Charles Dickens	De grandes espérances	English	Jean-Jacques Greif	Tristram
2023	José María Arguedas	Le Renard d’en haut et le Renard d’en bas	Spanish	Rosana Orihuela	Grevis
2024	Stefano D'Arrigo	Horcynus Orca	Italian	Monique Bacceli and Antonio Werli	Nouvel Attila
