= Nii Parkes =

British performance poet, writer, publisher and broadcaster (born 1974)

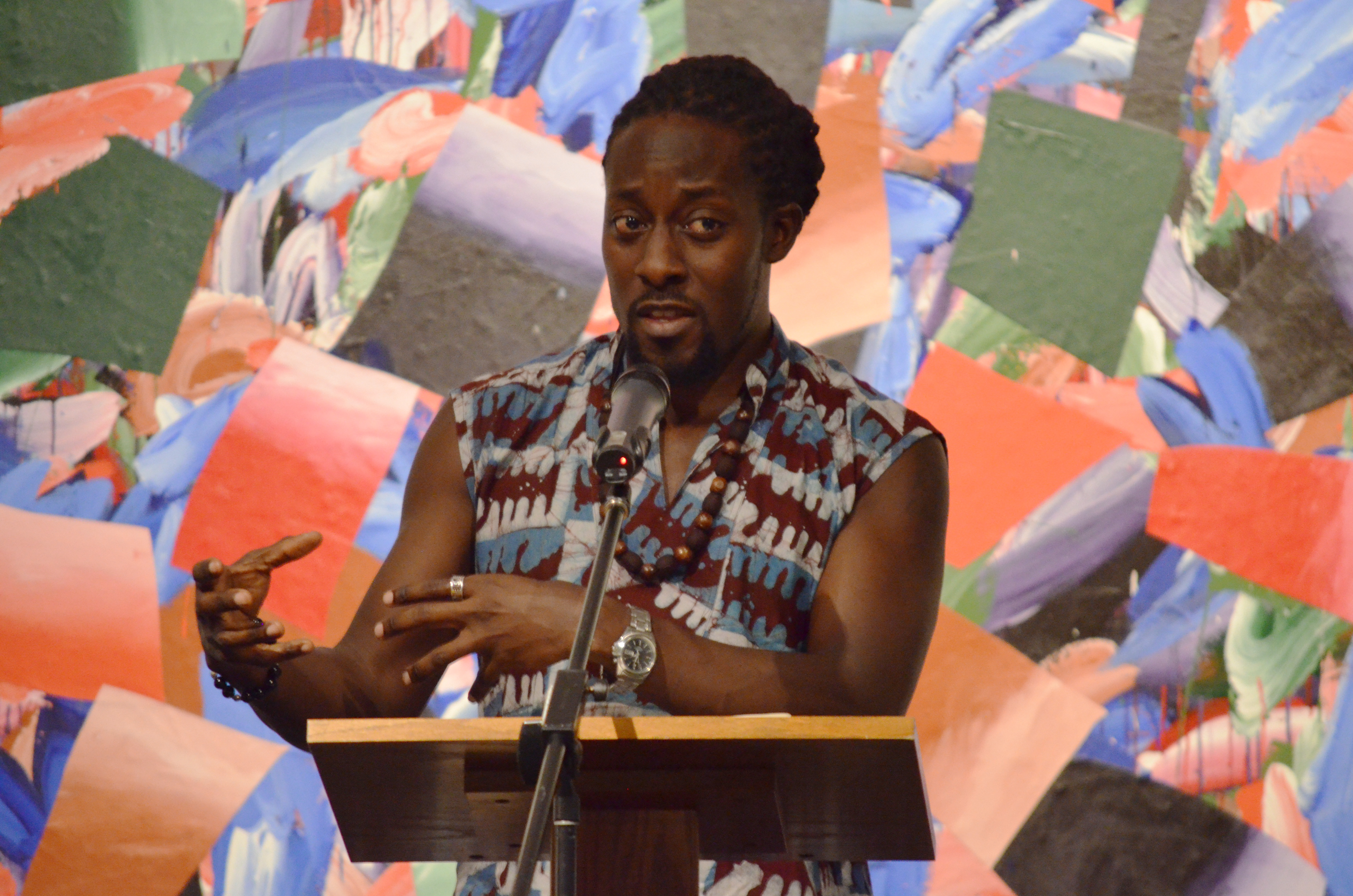
- Parkes at Neustadt Festival, 2015
- Born: Nii Ayikwei Parkes; 1 April 1974 (age 52); Lincolnshire, United Kingdom
- Education: Achimota School; Manchester Metropolitan University; Birkbeck College
- Occupations: Novelist, editor, poet, broadcaster, essayist
- Relatives: J. C. E. Parkes; Kofi Awoonor; Frank Kobina Parkes
- Writing career
- Pen name: K.P. Kojo
- Period: 1999–present
- Genres: Fiction, poetry
- Subject: Semiotics
- Notable works: Tail of the Blue Bird, The Makings of You
- Notable awards: Prix Laure Bataillon
- Movements: Anansesem, Postmodernism
- Website: niiparkes.com/open

Nii Ayikwei Parkes (/ˌniːˈi ˈaɪˈɪkweɪ ˈpɑːrks/; born 1 April 1974), born in the United Kingdom to parents from Ghana, where he was raised, is a performance poet, writer, publisher and sociocultural commentator. He is one of 39 writers aged under 40 from sub-Saharan Africa who in April 2014 were named as part of the Hay Festival's prestigious Africa39 project. He writes for children under the name K.P. Kojo.

== Biography ==
Born in the UK while his parents were studying there, Nii Parkes was raised from the age of three or four in Ghana, where he was educated at Achimota School. His first editorial role was in 1988 working on his school magazine, The Achimotan, and he went on to co-found, at the age of 17, filla! magazine, Ghana's first student-run national magazine. Parkes subsequently studied in England at Manchester Metropolitan University. While there, he emerged as a performance poet and was also a member of the Black Writers' Group of Commonword. He was children's poet-in-residence at the Brighton Festival in 2007.

A veteran of several poetry festivals, and former poet-in-residence at the Poetry Café in London, he has performed poetry in the United Kingdom, Europe, Ghana and the United States and was a 2005 Associate Artist-In-Residence with BBC Radio 3. In 2007, he was British Council writer-in-residence at California State University, Los Angeles, and became one of the youngest living writers (along with Owen Sheers and Choman Hardi) featured in the Poems on the Underground programme in London with his poem "Tin Roof".

Parkes runs regular workshops in the UK and set up a Writer's Fund in Ghana to promote writing among the country's youth. He has recorded two CDs of his spoken-word poetry, Incredible Blues and Nocturne of Phrase, and has published three chapbooks of poetry: eyes of a boy, lips of a man, M is for Madrigal, and the self-published Shorter!, which was put together to raise money for the Writers' Fund initiative.

He is also the co-founder (in 2002) and Senior Editor at flipped eye publishing, for whom he compiled fourteen two (editor), Dance the Guns to Silence (co-editor with Kadija Sesay) and x-24: unclassified (co-editor with Tash Aw).

Parkes' short stories can be found in Tell Tales: Volume I (Tell Tales) and The Mechanics' Institute Review (Birkbeck College) and an excerpt from his second fiction manuscript, Afterbirth, was featured in the New Writing 15 anthology published by Granta Books in June 2007.

Also a playwright, his début play Walking Waterfall ran at London’s Almeida Theatre on 30 July and 31 July 2008, as part of the Tiata Fahodzi 2008 Tiata Delights season. The production was directed by Femi Elufowoju Jr., and featured a cast including Jude Akuwudike and Marcy Dolapo Oni. It later toured in East Anglia.

His debut novel, Tail of the Blue Bird, was published by Jonathan Cape in June 2009, and was shortlisted for the 2010 Commonwealth Writers' Prize. Translated into French by Sika Fakambi, it was published as Notre Quelque Part by Éditions Zulma, winning the 2014 Prix Baudelaire, Prix Mahogany and Prix Laure Bataillon and being selected by leading literary magazine Lire as the Best First Foreign Book of the year and one of the Top 20 books published in France in 2014.

An experienced performer of his work, Parkes has appeared at readings all over the world, including the Nuyorican Poets Cafe, New York; the Royal Festival Hall, London; and Java, Paris, and often leads writing and performance workshops. He was the resident poet at Borders bookstores, where he hosted the monthly open mic at Charing Cross Road between 2001 and 2005.

He became BookTrust's online writer-in-residence in 2009. In 2010, he became a writer-in-residence for the charity First Story. He also ran the African Writers' Evening series at the Poetry Café in Covent Garden.

In 2012, Parkes represented Ghana at Poetry Parnassus, the largest international poetry festival in the UK, held at London's Southbank Centre in conjunction with the London Olympics. In autumn 2014, the University of Tübingen welcomed him to that year's Writers' Lectureship together with Taiye Selasi, Priya Basil and Chika Unigwe, all of them writers representing what Selasi calls Afropolitan Literature.

In 2014–15, Parkes was the Royal Literary Fund Fellow at the University of Aberystwyth, Wales. He was selected as one of Africa's 39 most promising authors under the age of 40 for the World Book Capital Africa39 project in 2014.

Parkes ran the Creative Writing course at the African University College of Communications (AUCC) in Accra, Ghana, and sat on the Board of Trustees of pan-African literary initiative Writivism, with fellow writers Zukiswa Wanner, Chika Unigwe, NoViolet Bulawayo, E. C. Osondu and Lizzy Attree, until 2015.

Parkes was appointed as the founding director of the Ama Ata Aidoo Centre for Creative Writing (Aidoo Centre), launched in Accra in March 2017, under the auspices of the Kojo Yankah School of Communications Studies at the African University College of Communications (AUCC).

He serves on the editorial board of World Literature Today, is a trustee of the Caine Prize, and in 2019 became Producer of Literature and Talks at the Brighton Festival. He was chair of judges for the 2020 Commonwealth Short Story Prize.

His 2020 poetry collection, The Geez, was longlisted for the Rathbones Folio Prize, shortlisted for the Walcott Prize, and is a Poetry Book Society Recommendation.

== Personal life ==
Parkes is a descendant of J. C. E. Parkes (1861−1899), the Sierra Leone Creole civil servant, and traces his heritage back to enslaved Africans in Guadeloupe and Jamaica.

== Selected bibliography ==
Writing by Parkes has appeared in many publications, including Granta, The Guardian, Index on Censorship, International PEN Magazine, The Liberal, The Mechanics' Institute Review, Poetry News, Poetry Review, Sable, Statement (CSULA), Storyteller Magazine, X Magazine and Wasafiri.

=== Fiction ===
- Tail of the Blue Bird (novel), Jonathan Cape, 2009; Vintage, 2010, ISBN 978-0099526124.
  - Translated into Dutch (by Ronald Cohen) as De blauwe vogel, Q, 2010, ISBN 978-90-2143-846-7.
  - Translated into Japanese (by Kazue Daikoku) as Aoitori no Shippo, Web Press Happa-no-Kofu, 2014, ISBN 978-4-901274-28-9.
  - Translated into French (by Sika Fakambi) as Notre Quelque Part, Zulma, 2014, ISBN 978-2843047701.
  - Translated into Spanish (by Magdalena Palmer) as El Enigma del Pájaro Azul, Club Editor, 2017, ISBN 978-84-7329-217-7.
  - Translated into Catalan (by Xavier Pàmies) as L'enigma de l'ocell blau, Club Editor, 2017, ISBN 978-84-7329-216-0.
  - Translated into Estonian (by Heili Sepp) as Sinise linnu saladus, Kultuurileht, 2024, ISBN 9789916713914.
- Azúcar (novel), Peepal Tree Press, 2023, ISBN 9781845235475.

=== Poetry ===
- eyes of a boy, lips of a man, Flipped Eye Publishing, 1999; 2nd edition 2005, ISBN 978-9988002466.
- M is for Madrigal: Seven Poems, tall lighthouse, 2004, ISBN 978-1904551096.
- The Makings of You, Peepal Tree Press, 2010, ISBN 978-1845231590.
- The Geez, Peepal Tree Press, 2020, ISBN 9781845234775.

=== Children's literature ===
- The Parade, Frances Lincoln Publishers, 2010 (as K.P. Kojo)
- Tales From Africa, Puffin Classics, 2017 (as K.P. Kojo)
- The Ga Picture Alphabet, Kane Series, 2020

=== As editor ===
- Fourteen Two: Twenty Eight Love Poems, flipped eye publishing, 2004, ISBN 978-0954224790
- With Kadija Sesay, Dance the Guns to Silence: 100 Poems for Ken Saro-Wiwa, flipped eye publishing, 2005, ISBN 978-1905233014 (includes work by Amiri Baraka, Sonia Sanchez, Kevin Powell & Jayne Cortez)
- With Tash Aw, X-24: Unclassified, flipped eye publishing, 2007, ISBN 978-0954157012 (includes work by Naomi Alderman & Daniel Alarcon
- South of South, Peepal Tree Press, 2011, ISBN 978-1845231545 (includes work by Monica Arac de Nyeko and Junot Díaz)
- Filigree: Contemporary Black British Poetry, Peepal Tree Press, 2018, ISBN 978-1845234263 (includes work by Roger Robinson & Tishani Doshi)

=== Selected essays and articles ===
- "No individual 'fathered' modern African literature", The Guardian, 2 December 2009.
- "Ants of Accra", Granta 112, 2 September 2010.
- "Nii Ayikwei Parkes. My London: Blythe Hill Fields", The Financial Times, 8 August 2014.
- "The Responsibility of Being Other", Writivism, 4 July 2017.

== Awards and recognition ==
- 2003: Farrago Best Overall Poetry Performance Award
- 2004: Farrago Best Overall Poetry Performance Award
- 2007: Ghana's National ACRAG award for poetry and literary advocacy
- 2009: Finalist for the UK YCE Publishing Award
- 2010: Shortlisted for Commonwealth Writers' Prize (for Tail of the Blue Bird)
- 2012: USBBY Outstanding International Books List (for The Parade, as K.P. Kojo)
- 2014: Prix Mahogany (for Notre Quelque Part)
- 2014: Prix Laure Bataillon (for Notre Quelque Part)
- 2020: Poetry Book Society Recommendation (for The Geez)
- 2021: Rathbones Folio Prize, Longlist (for The Geez)
- 2021: Walcott Prize, Shortlist (for The Geez)
- 2023: Glenna Luschei Prairie Schooner Award (for Mauve is a Song Worth Singing, essay)
- 2024: Elected Fellow of the Royal Society of Literature
