= E. C. Osondu =

Nigerian writer

Epaphras Chukwuenweniwe Osondu, predominantly known as E. C. Osondu, is a Nigerian writer known for his short stories. His story Waiting won the 2009 Caine Prize for African Writing, for which he had been a finalist in 2007 with his story Jimmy Carter's Eyes. Osondu had previously won the Allen and Nirelle Galso Prize for Fiction and his story A Letter from Home was judged one of "The Top Ten Stories on the Internet" in 2006.

Osondu's writing has been published in Agni, Guernica, Vice, Fiction, and The Atlantic. His debut collection of short stories, Voice of America, was published in 2010.

== Biography ==
Epaphras Chukwuenweniwe Osondu was born in Nigeria, where he worked as an advertising copywriter for many years. He received an M.F.A in creative writing from Syracuse University in 2007. He has been teaching at Providence College since 2012, where he is a professor of English, teaching courses in Creative Writing, Introduction to Literature, and the Development of Western Civilization.

Waiting, published in October 2008 by Guernica, describes life in a refugee camp from a child's point of view. Meakin Armstrong, the magazine's fiction editor, noted that "it isn't pretentious nor rife with literary trickery. It's simply a well-told story about a kind of life most of us couldn't even begin to imagine." In addition to the £10,000 cash award, the Caine Prize also brought Osondu a month's residency at Georgetown University in Washington, D.C. Osondu's Voice of America is included in Gods and Soldiers: The Penguin Anthology of Contemporary African Writing (2009).

After winning the Caine Prize in 2008, he has gone on to win the Pushcart Prize, the BOA Short Fiction Prize, the Allen and Nirrelle Galson Prize, among others.

His short fiction has appeared in The Atlantic, AGNI, N+1, Harper's Magazine, Kenyon Review, Zyzzyva, Lapham's Quarterly, and has been translated into many languages including Japanese, Italian, Greek, French, Icelandic, Belarusian, etc.

Osondu sits on the pan-African literary initiative, Writivism's Board of Trustees, with fellow writers Zukiswa Wanner, Chika Unigwe, NoViolet Bulawayo, Nii Parkes and Lizzy Attree.

== Books ==
Voice of America- Short Stories

This House is Not For Sale- Novel

When the Sky is Ready the Stars Will Appear- Novel
