= On Black Sisters Street =

2011 novel by Chika Unigwe

- First edition (Dutch)
- Author: Chika Unigwe
- Original title: Fata Morgana
- Language: English
- Genre: Literary fiction
- Publisher: Meulenhoff / Manteau
- Publication date: 26 April 2011
- Publication place: Nigeria
- Media type: Print (hardback)
- Pages: 272
- ISBN: 978-1-4000-6833-3
- Preceded by: The Phoenix
- Followed by: The Night Dancer

On Black Sisters’ Street is a novel by Nigerian author Chika Unigwe. It was originally written in English, but was first published in a Dutch translation by Hans van Riemsdijk as Fata Morgana, in 2007. It was first published in English in 2009 (Jonathan Cape, London) as On Black Sisters' Street. The novel is about African prostitutes living and working in Belgium. On Black Sisters' Street won the 2012 Nigeria Prize for Literature, Africa's largest literary prize at $100,000.

== Plot summary ==
The story is set on Zwartezusterstraat which is the "Black Sisters' Street" in Antwerp, Belgium. Here four migrant sex-workers try to make enough money to pay back the Nigerian pimp named Dele for the fee he claims for transporting them from Nigeria to Belgium.
