= The Middle Daughter =

2023 novel by Chika Unigwe

- Author: Chika Unigwe
- Language: English
- Genre: Literary fiction
- Set in: Enugu
- Publisher: Dzanc Books
- Publication date: 4 April 2023
- Publication place: Nigeria
- Media type: Print (hardback)
- Pages: 312
- ISBN: 9781950539468

The Middle Daughter is a social novel written by Chika Unigwe and published by Dzanc Books in 2023. Unigwe drew her inspiration from the story of Hades and Persephone.

== Plot summary ==
After Udodi died, the family thought their troubles were over, but they were wrong. When Nani, who's seventeen, lost her sister and dad one after the other, her life got really tough. Caught in grief, Nani finds herself isolated and misunderstood by her mother and sister. In the midst of her misery, she is drawn to a preacher who claims to have a direct line to God. His promises of belonging and understanding offer Nani a glimmer of hope. He seemed to offer her hope and a place to belong. But the more Nani got involved with him, the more she drifted away from her family. As time went on, Nani grew apart from her family, who were once very close. She ended up in a bad marriage where her husband treated her badly. She loved her children, but she was scared to leave because of them. Still, Nani knew she had to be strong and find a way out of her situation.

With bravery and determination, Nani started to find herself again. She faced her fears and learned to trust in herself. In the end, she realized that she could overcome anything, as long as she held onto what mattered most to her.

== Characters ==
- Nani — the protagonist
- Udodi — Nani's older sister
- Ugo — Nani's younger sister
- Ephraim Nani's abusive husband
- Enuka — Nani's friend

== Reception ==
Delight Ejiaka writing for World Literature Today reviews that "[t]he writing in the book is compelling and grounds the reader in its scenes." noting that "[t]he novel is fast-paced and plot-driven with great character development that propels the reader through the pages." Praising Unigwe for "raises the stakes of the story with every chapter until it crescendos and leaves the audience devastated." Ainehi Edoro of Brittle Paper compared it favourably to Second Class Citizen by Buchi Emecheta, reviewing that "The Middle Daughter is a powerful story about the truest, most luxuriant feminist joy—the joy of freedom." Ukamaka Olisakwe of Isele Magazine gave it a five star review, praising that "[t]he book is structured in an astonishingly ingenious form."
