= UEA Creative Writing Course =

M.A. course at the University of East Anglia

The University of East Anglia's Creative Writing Course was founded by Sir Malcolm Bradbury and Sir Angus Wilson in 1970. The M.A. has been regarded among the most prestigious in the United Kingdom.

The course allows specialisation in the following strands: prose, creative non-fiction, poetry, scriptwriting (which is Skillset accredited) and crime fiction. In 2024, a new strand, MA Creative Writing, which allows students to work across different literary forms, was launched. Each strand results in an M.A. qualification upon successful completion of the course. Course Directors have included Andrew Cowan, Tessa McWatt, Tiffany Atkinson, Steve Waters, Kathryn Hughes, Lavinia Greenlaw, and Henry Sutton. Writers teaching on the course in recent years have included Amit Chaudhuri, Trezza Azzopardi, Giles Foden, Tobias Jones, James Lasdun, Jean McNeil and George Szirtes.

Writers such as Margaret Atwood, Angela Carter, Rose Tremain, Andrew Motion, W. G. Sebald, Michèle Roberts and Patricia Duncker have also taught on the course.

Writers-in-residence have included Alan Burns and Margaret Atwood. Ali Smith has been a Writing Fellow and Visiting Professor on the programme. From 2021 to 2022, Tsitsi Dangarembga was the inaugural International Chair of Creative Writing.

== Notable alumni ==
=== Nobel Prize winners ===
- Kazuo Ishiguro (MA, 1980), 2017 Nobel Prize in Literature laureate

=== Booker Prize winners ===
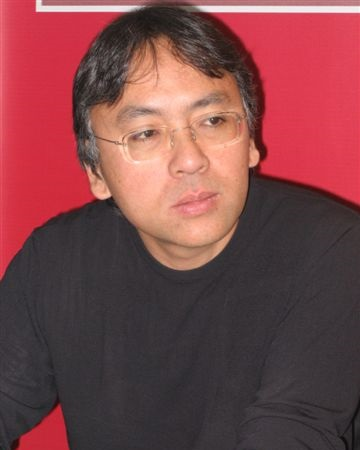
Nobel Prize in Literature laureate Kazuo Ishiguro

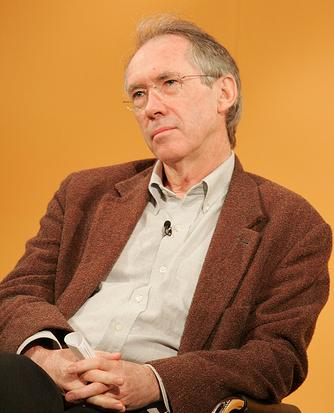
Booker Prize winner Ian McEwan

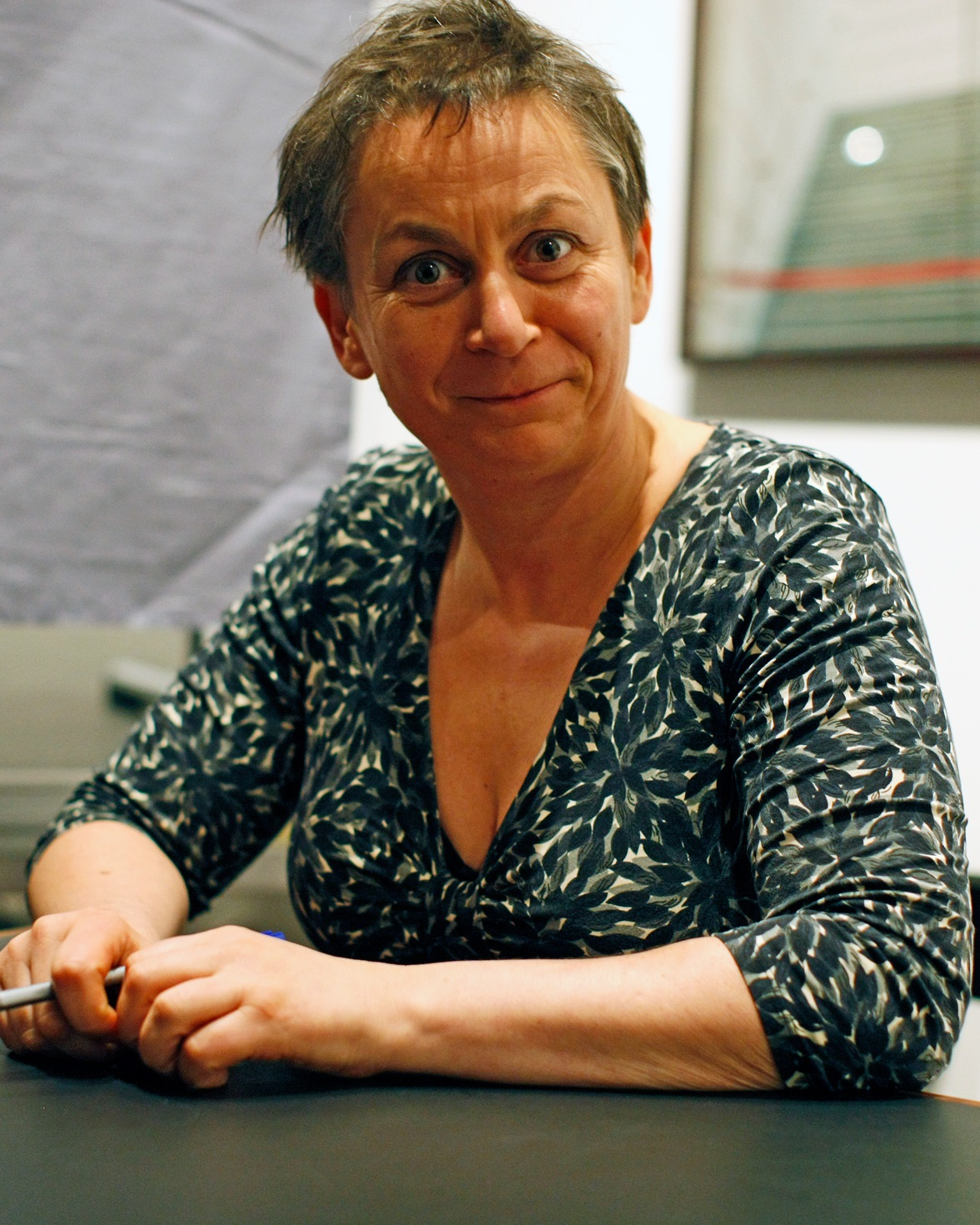
Booker Prize winner Anne Enright

- Anne Enright (MA, 1987), 2007 Booker Prize winner for The Gathering
- Kazuo Ishiguro (MA, 1980), 1989 Booker Prize winner for The Remains of the Day
- Ian McEwan (MA, 1971), 1998 Booker Prize winner for Amsterdam

=== Costa Book Award winners ===
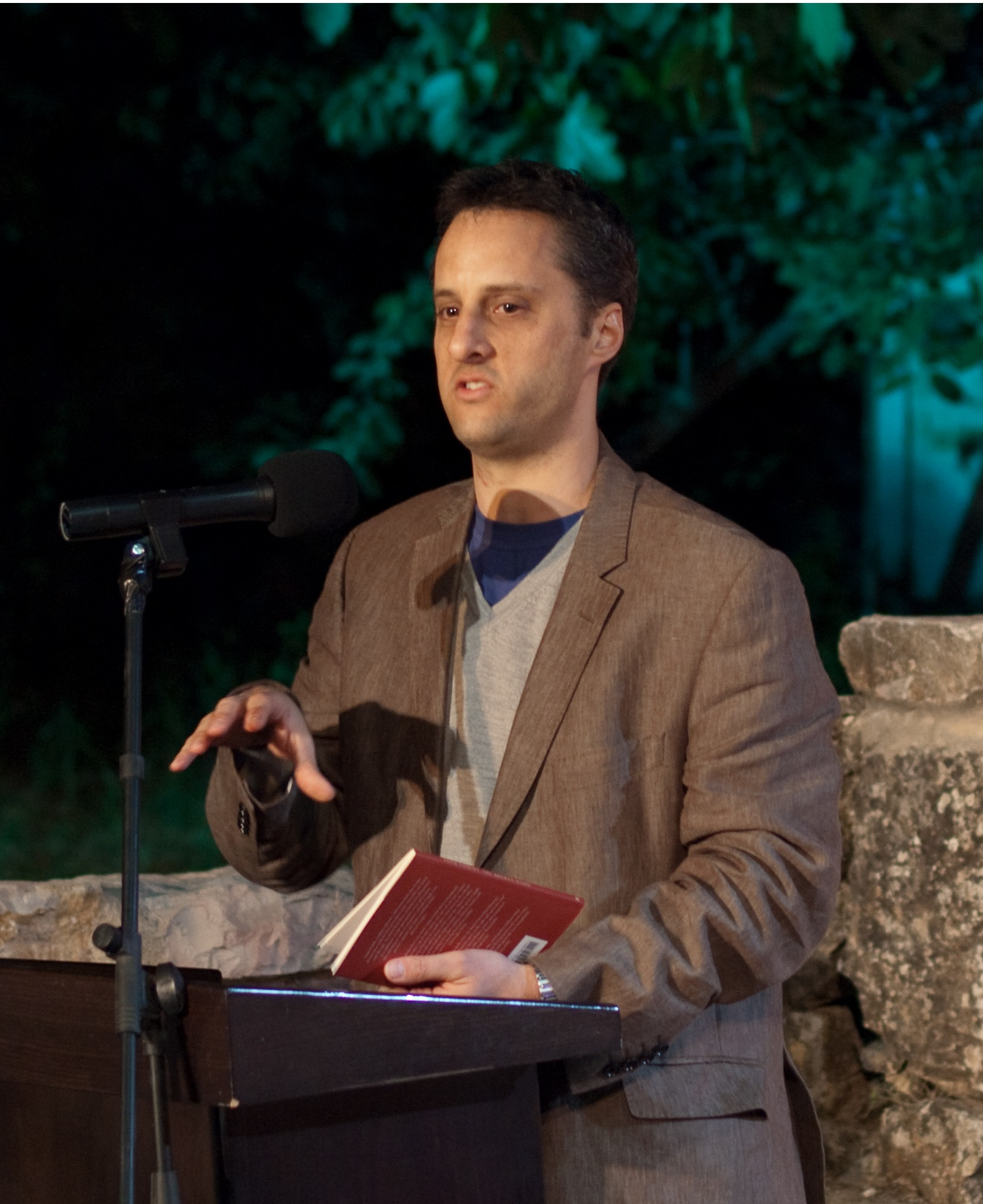
Costa Book Award winner Adam Foulds

- Tash Aw (MA, 2003), Whitbread Book Award winner in the 2005 First Novel category for The Harmony Silk Factory
- Susan Fletcher (MA, 2002), Whitbread Book Award winner in the 2004 First Novel category for Eve Green
- Adam Foulds (MA, 2000), Costa Book Award winner in the 2008 Poetry category for The Broken Word
- Emma Healey (MA, 2011), Costa Book Award winner in the 2014 First Novel category for Elizabeth is Missing
- Andrew Miller (MA, 1991), Costa Book Award winner in the 2011 Novel category for Pure
- Monique Roffey (BA, 1987), Costa Book Award winner in the 2020 Novel category for The Mermaid of Black Conch
- Christie Watson (MA, 2009), Costa Book Award winner in the 2011 First Novel category for Tiny Sunbirds Far Away

=== Women's Prize for Fiction winners ===
- Naomi Alderman (MA, 2003), 2017 Women's Prize for Fiction winner for The Power
- Rose Tremain (BA, 1967), 2008 Women's Prize for Fiction winner for The Road Home

=== Betty Trask Award & Prize winners ===
- Rowan Hisayo Buchanan (PhD, 2019) 2017 Betty Trask Award winner for Harmless Like You
- Sam Byers (MA, 2003; PHD, 2014) 2014 Betty Trask Award winner for Idiopathy
- Anthony Cartwright (BA, 1996) 2004 Betty Trask Award winner for The Afterglow
- Helen Cross (MA, 1997) 2002 Betty Trask Award winner for My Summer of Love
- Suzannah Dunn (MA, 1989) 1991 Betty Trask Award winner for Quite Contrary
- Susan Elderkin (MA, 1994) 2000 Betty Trask Award winner for Sunset Over Chocolate Mountains
- Diana Evans (MA, 2003) 2005 Betty Trask Award winner for 26a
- Susan Fletcher (MA, 2002) 2005 Betty Trask Prize winner for Eve Green
- Adam Foulds (MA, 2000) 2007 Betty Trask Award winner for The Truth About These Strange Times
- Imogen Hermes Gowar (MA, 2014) 2019 Betty Trask Award winner for The Mermaid and Mrs Hancock
- Emma Healey (MA, 2011) 2015 Betty Trask Award winner for Elizabeth is Missing
- Anjali Joseph (MA, 2008; PHD, 2013) 2011 Betty Trask Prize winner for Saraswati Park
- Frances Liardet (MA, 1998) 1994 Betty Trask Award winner for The Game
- Nicola Monaghan (MA, 2018) 2006 Betty Trask Award winner for The Killing Jar
- Glenn Patterson (MA, 1986) 1988 Betty Trask Award winner for Burning Your Own
- Natasha Pulley (MA, 2012) 2017 Betty Trask Award winner for The Watchmaker of Filigree Street
- Phil Whitaker (MA, 1996) 1998 Betty Trask Award winner for Eclipse of the Sun

=== James Tait Black Memorial Prize winners ===
- Ian McEwan (MA, 1971) James Tait Black Memorial Prize winner in the 2005 Fiction category for Saturday
- Andrew Miller (MA, 1991) James Tait Black Memorial Prize winner in the 1997 Fiction category for Ingenious Pain
- Rose Tremain (BA, 1967) James Tait Black Memorial Prize winner in the 1993 Fiction category for Sacred Country

=== Other alumni ===
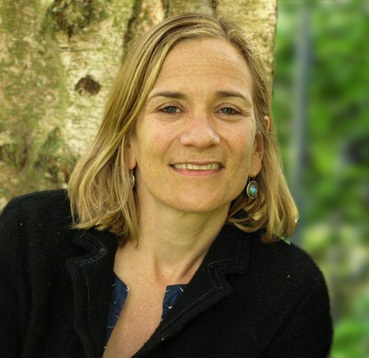
Historical novelist Tracy Chevalier

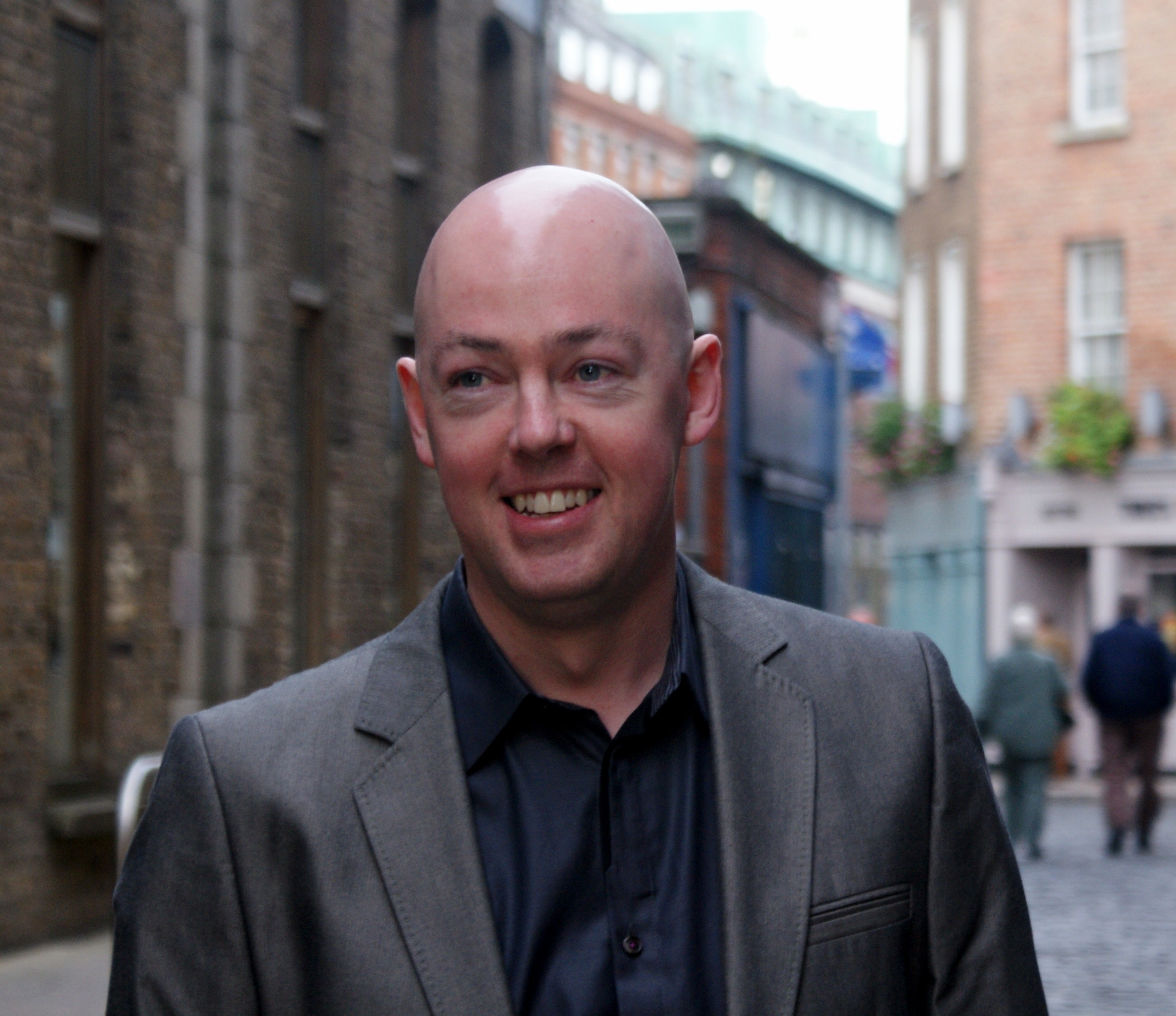
Novelist John Boyne

- Nicholas Allan (MA, 1981), children's author
- Mona Arshi (MA, 2012), Forward Prize-winning poet
- Trezza Azzopardi (MA, 1998), novelist
- Martyn Bedford (MA, 1994), novelist
- Brett Ellen Block (MA, 1998), author
- Peter Bowker (MA, 1991), screenwriter
- John Boyne (MA, 1996), novelist
- Aifric Campbell (MA, 2003), writer
- Tracy Chevalier (MA, 1994), historical novelist
- Cassandra Clark (MA, 1991), historical novelist
- Judy Corbalis (MA, 1990), novelist
- Andrew Cowan (MA, 1985), novelist
- Fflur Dafydd (MA, 2000), writer
- Donna Daley-Clarke (MA, 2001), novelist
- Louise Doughty (MA, 1987), novelist
- Joe Dunthorne (MA, 2005), novelist
- Oliver Emanuel (MA, 2002), playwright
- Stephen Finucan (MA, 1996), short story writer
- David Flusfeder (MA, 1988), author
- Bo Fowler (MA, 1995), novelist
- Ruth Gilligan (MA, 2011), writer
- Tim Guest (MA, 1999), author
- Mohammed Hanif (MA, 2005), writer
- Graeme Harper (PhD, 1997), writer
- Jane Harris (MA, 1992), novelist and screenwriter
- Alix Hawley (MA, 2002), novelist
- Kathryn Hughes (MA, 1987), historian
- Naomi Ishiguro (MA, 2018), author
- Mick Jackson (MA, 1992), novelist
- Christopher James (MA, 2000), poet
- Panos Karnezis (MA, 2000), novelist
- Larissa Lai (MA, 2001), novelist
- Hernán Lara Zavala (MA 1981), novelist
- Joanna Laurens (MA, 2003), playwright
- Ágnes Lehóczky (MA, 2006), poet
- Toby Litt (MA, 1995), novelist
- Philip MacCann (MA), writer
- Deirdre Madden (MA, 1985), novelist
- Robert McGill (MA, 2002), writer
- Sarah Emily Miano (MA, 2002), author
- Neel Mukherjee (MA, 2001), writer
- Paul Murray (MA, 2001), novelist
- Sandra Newman (MA, 2002), writer
- Kathy Page (MA, 1988), novelist
- Sandeep Parmar (MA, 2003), poet
- Christine Pountney (MA, 1997), author
- Dina Rabinovitch (MA, 2000), journalist and writer
- Ben Rice (MA, 2000), novelist
- Eliza Robertson (MA, 2012), author
- Anthony Sattin (MA, 1984), writer
- Simon Scarrow (MA, 1992), author
- James Scudamore (MA, 2004), novelist
- Owen Sheers (MA, 1998), author, poet and playwright
- Jeremy Sheldon (MA, 1996), novelist
- Robert Sheppard (MA, 1979), poet
- Kathryn Simmonds (MA, 2002), poet
- Rob Magnuson Smith (MA 2010), novelist
- Paul Stewart (MA, 1979), writer
- Julia Stuart (MA, 2013), novelist
- Todd Swift (MA, 2004), poet
- Rebecca Tamás (PHD, 2017), poet and essayist
- Mark Tilton (MA, 1997), screenwriter
- Carol Topolski (MA, 2004), novelist
- Erica Wagner (MA, 1991), author and literary editor of The Times
- Craig Warner (MA, 2013), playwright and screenwriter
- Matt Whyman (MA, 1992), novelist
- Clare Wigfall (MA, 2000), writer
- Luke Williams (MA, 2002), author
- D. W. Wilson (MA, 2010), author
- Jennifer Wong (MA, 2009), writer and poet
- Yan Ge (MA, 2020), novelist
