= Gabriel Josipovici =

British writer and professor

Gabriel David Josipovici FBA FRSL (/ˌdʒɒsɪpoʊˈviːtʃi/ JOSS-i-po-VEE-chee; born 8 October 1940) is a British novelist, short story writer, critic, literary theorist, and playwright. He is an Emeritus professor, after having been Professor at the University of Sussex.

== Biography ==
He was born in Nice, France in 1940, of Russo-Italian, Romano-Levantine Jewish parents. He lived out the war years in a village in the Massif Central and when the war ended in 1945 his mother returned with him to Egypt, where she was born. There he was educated at Victoria College, Cairo, until in 1956 he and his mother emigrated to England, where he finished his schooling at Cheltenham College, Gloucestershire. He read English at St Edmund Hall, Oxford, graduating in 1961 with a First Class degree, and in 1963 he joined the School of European Studies at the newly-formed University of Sussex. He retired from Sussex in 1998 to devote himself to writing. He gave the Northcliffe Lectures at the University of London in 1981-2 and was Lord Weidenfeld Professor of Comparative Literature at Oxford in 1996-7. He has published nineteen novels, three volumes of stories and a number of critical books, as well as A Life, a memoir of his mother, the poet and translator Sacha Rabinovitch. Carcanet Press has published his work since his novel Contre Jour in 1986. His plays have been performed throughout Britain and on radio in France and Germany, and his work has been translated into many languages, including French (where his novel Infinity, translated by Bernard Hoepffner, won the Prix Laure Bataillon in 2016) and Arabic. In 2007 Gabriel Josipovici gave the University of London Coffin Lecture on Literature; the lecture was entitled "What ever happened to Modernism?" and was subsequently published as a book by Yale University Press.

He has published reviews in many journals, including Encounter (magazine), The London Magazine and The New York Review of Books, and writes regularly for The Times Literary Supplement.

Josipovici was elected a Fellow of the Royal Society of Literature in 1997 and Fellow of the British Academy in 2001.

== Selected works ==
=== Fiction ===
- The Inventory (1968)
- Words (1971)
- Mobius the Stripper: Stories and Short Plays (1974)
- The Present (1975)
- Four Stories (1977)
- Migrations (1977)
- The Echo Chamber (1979)
- The Air We Breathe (1981)
- Conversations in Another Room (1981)
- Contre Jour (Carcanet Press, 1984)
- In the Fertile Land (Carcanet Press, 1987)
- Steps: Selected Fiction and Drama (Carcanet Press, 1990)
- The Big Glass (Carcanet Press, 1991)
- In a Hotel Garden (1993)
- Moo Pak (Carcanet Press, 1996) (Hardback, 1994)
- Now (Carcanet Press, 1998)
- Goldberg: Variations (Carcanet Press, 2002)
- Only Joking (2005)
- Everything Passes (Carcanet Press, 2006)
- After and Making Mistakes (Carcanet Press, 2008)
- Heart's Wings (Carcanet Press, 2010)
- Infinity (Carcanet Press, 2012)
- Hotel Andromeda (Carcanet Press, 2014)
- The Cemetery in Barnes (Carcanet Press, 2018)
- Partita (Carcanet, 2024)

=== Non-fiction ===
- The World and the Book (1971, 1979)
- The Lessons of Modernism (1977, 1987)
- Writing and the Body (1982)
- The Mirror of Criticism: Selected Reviews (1983)
- The Book of God: A Response to the Bible (1988, 1990)
- Text and Voice (Carcanet Press, 1992)
- Touch (Yale University Press, 1996)
- On Trust: Art and the Temptations of Suspicion (1999)
- A Life (2001). A memoir of Josipovici's mother.
- The Singer on the Shore: Essays 1991–2004 (Carcanet Press, 2006)
- What Ever Happened to Modernism? (Yale University Press, 2010)
- Hamlet Fold on Fold (Yale University Press, 2016)
- The Teller and the Tale: Essays on Literature and Culture 1990-2015 (Carcanet Press, 2016)
- Forgetting (Carcanet Press, 2020)
- 100 Days (Little Island Press, 2021)
- A Winter in Zürau (Carcanet, 2024)
