= James C.E. Parkes =

British colonial civil servant (1861–1899)

James Charles Ernest Parkes (1861−1899) was the first colonial Secretary for Native Affairs in Sierra Leone. He served in office during the turbulent Hut Tax War of 1898. Parkes wrote an extensive report on life in Sierra Leone's protectorate. His only son moved to Ghana and among his descendants are Nii Ayikwei Parkes.

== Early life ==
A Sierra Leone Creole, James Charles Ernest Parkes was born in 1861 to Thomas Parkes and a mother of part West Indian and Nova Scotian descent. Thomas Parkes was a West Indian whose father was a disbanded soldier of the West India Regiment. Thomas had arrived with his father in the Sierra Leone Colony in 1818. Parkes was educated at the CMS Grammar School, Freetown, and worked for some time at the Queen's Advocate Department.

== Career ==
J. C. E. Parkes was promoted from a clerkship in the Commandant's office in Bonthe to the Aborigine branch of the Secretariat. Due to his knowledge and understanding of indigenous culture and affairs, Governor Hay reorganized the Aborigine branch of the Secretariat and established Parkes as superintendent of an independent branch (later to be renamed the Department of Native Affairs). Parkes was to answer and serve directly under the Governor, and initially Parkes' office was in the spacious house built in Rawdon Street by John MacCormac, an Irish trader (who was the brother of Dr. Henry McCormack and uncle of Dr. William MacCormac).
