= Night Dancer (novel) =

2012 novel by Chika Unigwe

- Author: Chika Unigwe
- Language: English
- Genre: Fiction
- Publisher: Jonathan Cape
- Publication date: 7 June 2012
- Publication place: Nigeria
- Pages: 272
- ISBN: 0-224-09383-5

Night Dancer is a 2012 novel by Nigerian author Chika Unigwe. The novel follows Mma, who, after burying her mother, inherits both her possessions and her troubled past. Determined to uncover her family's secrets and her own identity, Mma embarks on a quest for truth. Set in Nigeria over fifty years, the novel explores themes of family, duty, and the enduring bond between mothers and daughters, offering exploration of belonging and resilience.

== Plot summary ==
Night Dancer is a novel set nearly over fifty years, avoiding the overwhelming backdrop of the Biafran War. Mma, a conflicted character, longs for her absent father, leading to strained relations with her mother. Ezi, another character, offers a smoother narrative, sparking curiosity about the author's nonfiction work. Mike's charm (Ema's father) is overshadowed by questions of authenticity or ingrained entitlement. Madam Gold's enigmatic presence contrasts with Rapu, a compelling villainess.

== Characters ==
- Mma: The protagonist, characterized by inner conflict and a longing for her absent father, leading to strained relations with her mother.
- Ezi: Another character, whose narrative provides a smoother reading experience, sparking curiosity about the author's nonfiction works.
- Mike: A lovable character with passionate traits, but whose authenticity comes into question, possibly reflecting societal expectations of African masculinity.
- Madam Gold: An enigmatic character who serves as a maternal figure, contrasting with Rapu's villainous personnel.

== Themes ==
- Identity and Family: The novel delves into questions of identity, particularly through the lens of family dynamics. Mma's search for her father and her conflicted relationship with her mother highlight the complexities of familial bonds and the impact of absent parents on one's sense of self.
- Mother-Daughter Relationships: The relationship between mothers and daughters is a central theme, explored through Mma's feelings of longing, resentment, and curiosity towards her mother. This theme delves into the nuances of maternal love, intergenerational conflict, and the search for understanding.
- Masculinity and Expectations: The character of Mike raises questions about masculinity and societal expectations. His charming demeanor is juxtaposed with doubts about his sincerity, prompting reflection on the pressures and stereotypes faced by African men.
- Villainy and Morality: The presence of Rapu as a compelling villainess suggests themes of morality and the complexities of human nature. Readers are invited to question their perceptions of good and evil, and to explore the motivations behind Rapu's actions.
- Cultural Identity and History: Set against the backdrop of Nigeria over fifty years, the novel likely explores themes of cultural identity and historical context. The avoidance of the Biafran War and references to Igbo culture hint at a broader exploration of Nigerian history and its impact on individual lives.
