= Sunset Over Chocolate Mountains =

2000 novel by Susan Elderkin

- First edition (UK)
- Author: Susan Elderkin
- Cover artist: Vivid
- Language: English
- Publisher: Fourth Estate (UK); Grove Atlantic (US)
- Publication date: March 2000 (UK); April 2001 (US)
- Publication place: United Kingdom
- Media type: Print
- Pages: 320
- ISBN: 1-84115-199-8

Sunset Over Chocolate Mountains is a novel by English author Susan Elderkin published by Fourth Estate. It won a Betty Trask Award in 2000 and was shortlisted for the Orange Prize for fiction. The novel has been published in nine countries (it is called Arizona Ice Cream in France).

== Inspiration ==
In an interview with amazon.co.uk she reveals she began writing about a fat man doing yoga in the desert whilst studying on the UEA Creative Writing Course and then spent time herself living in the Arizona desert near Tucson. In writing it Elderkin drew on her own experiences having worked as an ice-cream seller and taught English at the same shoe factory featuring in the novel.

== Plot introduction ==
The story has three narrative voices:

Theobald Moon, 34 and overweight, who on the death of his mother sold the house they shared in Clapham, South London and emigrated to the Sonoran Desert in Arizona, his story begins with his arrival, settling in an isolated mobile-home and his wonder at his surroundings.

Jo, Theo's daughter whom he calls Jelly-O; she loves her father and helps him in his business of making ice-cream, but as she grows up starts to ask questions about her mother. She finds a stack of shoe boxes in a cupboard which her father will not discuss.

Eva Ligocká who works in a Bata shoe factory in Partizánske, Slovakia but then falls in love with Tibor, an itinerant Ice cream van man. Eventually they escape to the West.

== Reception ==
Reviews were mixed though generally positive:

- Publishers Weekly writes "British author Elderkin has crafted a complex, heartbreaking tale, entwining the lives of quirky characters in an improbable but compelling narrative illustrating the agonizing potential of love to cause more pain then [sic] pleasure. The reader occasionally feels distanced from the action, and an abrupt, unnerving ending falls short, but this is a promising debut."
- Kirkus Reviews concludes "Elderkin, à la Michael Cunningham in The Hours, plays out the three narratives in tandem, then reveals their underlying unity. The strings tying the sections together, however, are pretty obvious, and the conclusion feels thin. The real accomplishment here is the richness and detail of her sensory inventiveness. While Elderkin’s talent and ambition are obvious, her magnificent language sometimes dwarfs the characters and their story".
