= Cassandra Clark =

British novelist and playwright

- Born: 24 May 1942; Bridlington, East Yorkshire, England
- Education: Bedford College, London; University of East Anglia
- Occupations: Novelist, playwright
- Children: 2
- Writing career
- Pen name: Sandra Clark; Sally Heywood; Cassandra Clark
- Website: www.cassandraclark.co.uk

Cassandra Clark is an English novelist and playwright.

== Early life ==
Clark grew up in the East Riding of Yorkshire and attended a girls' grammar school before reading English and Philosophy at Bedford College, London.

== Career ==
After graduating, Clark divided her time between running a print-making business with her then husband, tutoring at the Open University and writing. Her first professional commission was a play for BBC Radio 4 called Down But Not Out, which was followed shortly afterwards by another commission, and representation with theatrical agent Peggy Ramsay. Clark was commissioned to write plays for radio and television, with theatre plays produced for the York Theatre Royal, the Croydon Warehouse in London and the Edinburgh Fringe Festival.

After a divorce, needing to support her two young children, Clark met romance writer Sara Craven at a BBC networking event. Craven advised her to "read as many as you can for six months, then write one". Clark followed the advice and became a writer for Mills & Boon, writing over 30 titles and seeing her daughters through school and into further education.

Clark also ran a lunch-time theatre and collaborated with composers on two music theatre works, one based on the life of Japanese novelist Yukio Mishima for York Arts Centre and the second, The Death of Purcell, for Smith Square Hall in London, with two choirs and orchestra conducted by Ronald Corp.

In 1991, she returned to study a Creative Writing MA at the University of East Anglia.

After a decade of caring for her elderly parents, Clark was commissioned to write a stage play for the Live Theatre Company in Newcastle and invited to Edward Albee's "Writers' Barn" in Montauk, New York to complete the final draft of the play, a trip that would be cut short by the catastrophic fall of the Twin Towers.

After training as a psychotherapist in North Yorkshire, and the death of her parents, Clark moved to London and began a series of Medieval mystery novels. Hangman Blind, the first of a 12-book series, was published by John Murray in 2008 and features a nun sleuth, Hildegard of Meaux. It received positive reviews from The Guardian, Financial Times and the Historical Novels Review and was praised for its thorough historical research by the East Riding News. The final book in the series, Dark Waters Rising was praised by Kirkus Reviews as "A fitting conclusion to an excellent series that immerses readers in medieval times and deeply conceived characters."

Subsequent books in the series were published by Macmillan/Minotaur and the collection was followed by a trilogy about the murder of King Richard II and the disappearance of Chaucer. The Brother Chandler series was published by Severn House between 2020 and 2024. In July 2024, she was interviewed about her writing life by the Bournemouth Writing Festival.

Clark currently divides her time between North Yorkshire and the English South Coast and is working on a screen adaptation of the Abbess of Meaux mystery series and a new stage play about free speech and the brief life of William Sawtrey, the first man to be burned in England for heresy.

Clark is a member of the Society of Authors, Crime Writers' Association and the Historical Writers Association.

== Commissioned drama (as Sandra Clark) ==
- Down But Not Out (1972, produced by Tony Cliff for BBC Radio 4)
- A Quick Thing (produced by Tony Cliff for BBC Radio 4)
- Hanging On (BBC2 TV)
- Escape Attempts (BBC1 TV)
- The Clash (BBC1 TV)
- Death Grip (York Theatre Royal)
- Balls (Warehouse Theatre, Croydon, London)
- Einstein Wouldn't Like It (York Theatre Royal)
- Eraser Fence (Riverside Studios Festival)
- Cheap Kills (York Theatre Royal and Edinburgh Festival Fringe)
- Time and Glass (12-hour unperformed Arts Council bursary)
- Gloriana (Ilkley Literature Festival)
- Sebek I-IV (Netherbow Theatre Edinburgh Festival Fringe)

== Music theatre (as Sandra Clark) ==
- Mishima (with composer Anthony Adams for York Arts Centre)
- Death of Purcell (with composer Lawrence Armstrong Hughes at Smith Square Hall in London)

== Novels (as Sally Heywood) ==
- The Wolf Man (1982)
- Moonlight Enough (1982)
- Stormy Weather (1983)
- Scarlet Sunday (1984)
- A Kiss is Just a Kiss (1985)
- A Fool to Say Yes (1986)
- Too Dangerous to Love (1986)
- Impossible To Forget (1987)
- Fantasy Lover (1988)
- Today, Tomorrow and Forever (1989)
- Law Of Love (1989)
- Trust Me, My Love (1989)
- Hazard of Love (1990)
- Love's Sweet Harvest (1990)
- Bride Of Ravenscroft (1990)
- Simply Forever (1990)
- Jungle Lover (1991)
- The Gemini Bride (1991)
- Steps To Heaven (1991)
- Dark Passion (1991)
- Castle of Desire (1992)
- Love Island (1992)
- Tides of Passion (1992)
- Master of Destiny (1994)

== Novels (as Cassandra Clark) ==
The Abbess of Meaux Series

- Hangman Blind (2008)
- The Red Velvet Turnshoe (2009)
- The Law of Angels (2011)
- A Parliament of Spies (2012)
- The Dragon of Handale (2015)
- The Butcher of Avignon (2014)
- The Scandal of the Skulls (2016)
- Ten Weeks That Changed England Forever (2016)
- The Alchemist of Netley Abbey (2017)
- Murder at Meaux (2018)
- Murder at Whitby Abbey (2019)
- Murder at Beaulieu Abbey (2021)
- Dark Waters Rising (2022)

The Broken Kingdom Series

- The Hour of the Fox (2020)
- The Day of the Serpent (2021)
- The Night of the Wolf (2023)
