= Henry Sutton (novelist) =

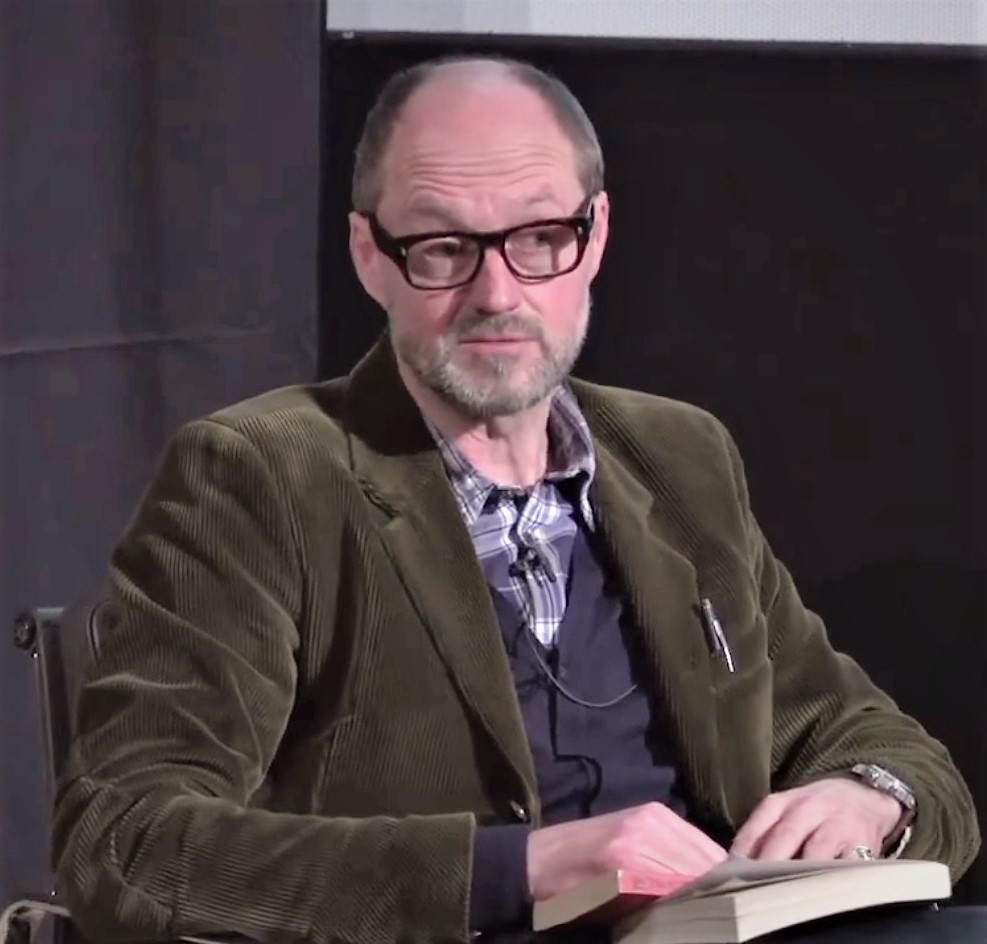
Sutton speaks on Crime Fiction at the British Library in 2013

Henry Edward Sutton (born 8 September 1963) is a crime novelist. The author of nine works of fiction including My Criminal World (2013) and Get Me Out of Here (2011), he teaches Creative Writing at the University of East Anglia, where he is a Senior Lecturer and the co-director of the Master of Arts in Prose Fiction UEA Creative Writing Course. In 2004, he won the J.B.Priestley Award.

== Early life ==
Sutton was born in Gorleston-on-Sea, Norfolk, to writer Belinda Brett and furniture maker Toby Sutton.

== Career ==
In 1983, Sutton began a career in journalism with Eastern Counties Newspapers as a feature writer and reporter. In 1987, he joined Haymarket Publishing as desk editor, and by 1991 he was working at The European where he performed a number of roles: travel editor, deputy arts editor, feature writer. He has served as Books Editor at the Daily Mirror, and as Literary Editor at Esquire magazine UK.

By 2008, Sutton was appointed as an Associate Creative Writing Tutor at the UEA, and in 2011, he was made a Senior Lecturer. He is also the director of the new Creative Writing MA Crime Fiction at UEA, and the founder of the Noirwich Crime Writing Festival.

In 2009, he was writer-in-residence at the university's British Centre of Literary Translation.

Sutton's first published work was Gorleston (1995), a novel about pensioner Percy Lanchester, a pensioner, struggling to come to terms with the death of his wife. Percy's life is turned upside down when he meets a notorious widow named Queenie. The Independent said this debut "pulls off the stunning feat of humanizing an out-of-season seaside resort".

His second novel, Bank Holiday Monday (1997) was also set in Norfolk, in a rented windmill on the coast where five adults and a child gather to spend the long weekend. The Guardian has said the tale "should be required reading for any middle-class couples considering renting a holiday home in Norfolk this summer".

The Househunter (1999) was described as "gloriously original" and "unashamedly honest" by British author and critic Julie Myerson.

Flying (2001) focuses on seven characters crewing an airliner on a long-haul return flight between London and New York, and the repercussions of a wild crew party in the down route hotel. Writing in The Guardian, he said he decided to set the novel on a plane, "thinking that an object capable of inspiring such powerful feelings in me would provide great source material".

Sutton's protagonist in Kids' Stuff (2005), his fifth book, is Mark – a practical man who is reunited with a long lost daughter, and is set in Norwich.

His next book, First Frost (2011) was a collaborative effort with James Gurbutt. They co-authored the novel, which is set in Denton, Greater Manchester, in 1981, and illuminates Detective Sergeant Jack Frost's backstory. Actor David Jason, who played Jack Frost (detective) in A Touch of Frost, "not only a gripping mystery, but an exclusive look at Jack Frost's early years."

His eighth novel, Get Me Out of Here (2011), was a work of crime fiction. The title is a play on the name for the reality television show I'm a Celebrity...Get Me Out of Here! At the centre of the story is paranoid ex-City worker Matt Freeman, a frustrated, unreliable narrator, prone to violent outbursts and ranting.

Sutton's eighth novel, My Criminal World (2013), is a meta-fictional story about struggling crime writer, David Slavitt. It has been hailed by fellow writers in the genre including Ian Rankin and Mark Billingham.

His latest work, Time to Win, will be released on 27 April 2017 and is written under the pseudonym Harry Brett. It is the first of a noir series set in Norfolk, and is published by Little, Brown Book Group.

== Personal life ==
Henry Sutton is married to the literary academic, Professor Rachel Potter. They have two children, Thomas and Stella. He has another daughter, Holly, from a previous relationship.

== Bibliography ==
- Time to Win – (Little, Brown)
- My Criminal World – 2013 (Harvill Secker, Vintage)
- Get Me Out of Here – 2011 (Harvill Secker, Vintage, Europa Editions)
- Thong Nation – 2006 (Serpent's Tail)
- First Frost −2011 (under penname James Henry, with co-author James Gurbutt) (Bantam, Corgi)
- Kids' Stuff – 2005 (Serpent's Tail)
- Flying – 2001 (Sceptre)
- The Househunter – 1999 (Sceptre)
- Bank Holiday Monday – 1997 (Sceptre)
- Gorleston −1995 (Sceptre)
