= Ghazi Gheblawi =

Libyan physician, author, blogger and activist

Ghazi Gheblawi (born 1975 in Tripoli) is a Libyan physician, author, blogger, and activist who has lived in Britain since 2002.

== Early life and education ==
Gheblawi grew up in Tripoli. "As one of a generation that grew up under Gaddafi's repressive and brutal dictatorship," he has written, "I know what it feels like when the basic goal of your existence becomes survival. Libyans like me who opposed his regime (whether subtly or overtly) had to develop a dual personality. Learning how to talk and write publicly in code became a vital skill to avoid persecution, not only of yourself but your family and friends."

He studied medicine in Tripoli. He holds the MBBch (Bachelor in Medicine) and MSc (Master of Science in medicine) degrees.

== Career ==
Since 2002, he has lived in Britain, where he works as a physician and writes frequently about the situation in his native country.

== Writings ==
Gheblawi is a writer both in Arabic and English literature. He was one of the founders of the net journal [Libya Alyoum] (Libya Today), where he was culture editor from 2004 to 2009. Since March 2011, he has been the international editor-in-chief for the Libya Press News Agency, an independent news portal based in London. He blogs regularly about Libya and the Arab world. As of 2011 he was an editor at Darf publishing house.

He has published two short-story collections in Arabic, and has published poems in English in various periodicals. Among them is Banipal: Magazine of Modern Arab Literature, which published his short story "A Rosy Dream" in a 2011 issue. As of 2011 he was an editor at Darf publishing house. In 2008 he read and discussed one of his poems at an "African Writers Evening."

As of December 2015, he was a member of the council of the Society for Libyan Studies. He acted as a judge for Caine Prize in African writing in 2017.

== 2011 Libyan Civil War ==
"When opposition forces began their operation to liberate Tripoli a few days ago," he wrote in August 2011, "one of the first things I noticed, speaking to my family in the capital, was that for the first time they were publicly denouncing Gaddafi, his sons and his regime. Doing that had in itself become an act of liberation....But it wasn't only personal fear that began to dissipate inside us during the last six months. We began also actively reclaiming a nation that had been hijacked for more than four decades....In just six months, a generation of young Libyans has begun to learn what it might mean to enjoy a life not ruled by the oppressive terror of falling foul of the rulers. Once they tasted this forbidden fruit, there was no going back."

In September 2011, he published a long article recounting the history of modern Libyan literature and summing up the impact of the recent revolution, which, he wrote, had "opened the door wide for endless possibilities and opportunities in creative writing, arts and the journalism. As state media and censorship became nearly obsolete in free Libya, many new publications sprang up. Pamphlets, newspapers and magazines began circulating in different forms and different languages."

In April 2013, the Index on Censorship published a report by Gheblawi about "Free Speech in Post-Gaddafi Libya." He wrote that while the introduction of freedom of speech in the country had been "hailed by many observers as one of the major achievements of the Libyan uprising," the "initial euphoria" had since yielded to frustration. "In the post-uprising reality, newspapers and television channels that dared investigate claims of corruption and human rights violations, committed mostly by rogue militant and fundamentalist armed groups, face violent attacks; television channels have been vandalised, journalists kidnapped and tortured, or forced into silence or exile, and in some cases imprisoned and prosecuted under Gaddafi-era laws."

In August 2013, BBC World broadcast an "audio essay" written and read by Gheblawi. He lamented the "serious problems" that now afflicted Libya, including continued conflict between different groups and a lack of law and order, all of which had led to widespread "despair and frustration" among the Libyan people. Still, he said, he was one of many Libyans who still maintained a "modest level of hope" for the country's future.

In a December 2015 article, Gheblawi complained that the international community and local leaders alike were at fault for the failure to build and maintain stable national institutions in Libya after Gaddafi's fall. This failure, he charged, had led to the instability, violence, and terrorism that were now threatening the country and region. He rejected the idea that it would have been better to keep Gaddafi in power, pointing out that the dictator had not only suppressed freedoms in Libya but also helped finance, plan, and carry out terrorist attacks around the world.

In January 2016, Gheblawi took part in a BBC World Service discussion of the current situation in Libya. He described the state of affairs in Tripoli as tense, although people were trying to live as normal a day-to-day life as possible.

Gheblawi has said that the Gaddafi dictatorship "rotted the fabric of society," and consequently Libyans "are not proud to be Libyan."

== Other professional activities ==
He gave a presentation about the Arab Spring at the 2011 Oslo Freedom Forum.
