= Dolapo Badmos =

Nigerian police officer

Personal details
- Born: Nigeria
- Education: Federal Polytechnic, Ado Ekiti University of Calabar University of Abuja National Open University of Nigeria Federal University of Technology, Lokoja.
- Occupation: Police Officer
- Awards: Crime Report Association of Nigeria (CRAN) Award

Ifedolapo Opeyemi Badmos popularly known as Dolapo Badmos is a Nigerian Police Officer and an Assistant Commissioner of Police who has held different positions in the Nigerian police force Dolapo Badmos is a Nigerian police officer and law enforcement officer known for her role in the Nigerian Police Force. She gained public recognition through her service in the Nigerian Police and has been active in various capacities within the force.

She has held roles related to public relations and law enforcement leadership.

== Early life and education ==
Badmos hails from Ekiti State in Nigeria. Born on 4th of August, 1977, she studied Accounting from the Federal Polytechnic, Ado Ekiti, Sociology from University of Abuja. she also owns a Master of Science degree in Public Administration and Doctorate degree in Public Sector Management

== Career ==
Badmos joined the Nigeria police force on 15 August 2002 as an Assistant Superintendent of police. She has served in various capacity with the Nigerian police force from 2002 till present. Dolapo Badmos has served as Aide de Camp (ADC) to the number four citizen of Nigeria. She has also served as the divisional traffic officer (DTO) in Alakuko, Lagos, after serving her term she was also promoted to be the Divisional Police Officer (DPO) in charge of Isokoko Division in Agege, Lagos state. In January, 2016 Dolapo Badmos was named as the new Lagos Police Public Relations officer (PPRO), which she served in the office for few months before she was elevated to zone 2 command covering both Lagos and Ogun state as Police Public Relations officer (PPRO). In June 2019, Dolapo Badmos was promoted to become Provost of the Nigeria Police force, the new position availed her the opportunity of changing her head gear, her new position as Provost puts her in charge of disciplining or taking disciplinary actions against erring police officers. ACP DOLAPO OPEYEMI BADMOS. Born on 4th of August, hails from Ado Ekiti . She’s a graduate of Accounting, Sociology and a master’s degree holder in Public Administration, currently pursuing her doctorate degree in Public Sector Management. She joined the Nigeria Police Force as a Cadet ASP on 15th of August 2002. She has served in various capacities within the force as Divisional and Area Crime Officer. She also served as a V. I. P protector while attached to Number 24 PMF presidential villa where she was Aide-de-camp to No. 4 citizen of the nation, the speaker of National Assembly, the only female officer to have occupied that position in the history of Nigeria. ACP Dolapo was also the Public Relations officer for Lagos and Zone 2 command between 2015 and 2019 respectively. She is also certified responder on Gender Based Violence as trained by United Kingdom DFID and Turkish Government. Prior to her promotion she was the CSP "A" for the Force Provost Marshall, Force Headquarters Abuja. The position she held for close to five(5) years where she brought her dexterity to forebear. She became the first female officer to be appointed as the AC in charge of operations in the Nigeria Police Force Intelligence unit. ACP Dolapo, has recorded many first feat as a female officer, she's currently the Police Adviser to the United Nation in New York, USA. Another position she's holding as the first female. Acp Dolapo is a fervent believer of Christ, a sport enthusiast and mother of 3 lovely biological children and 3 adopted ones.

== Controversy ==
In October 2020, it was alleged that Dolapo Badmos together with 36 members of the Nigeria police force were demoted on account of misconduct. The Police force however dismiss the claims and allegation and stated to the public that Dolapo Badmos was neither reprimanded, dismissed nor demoted.

== Award and recognition ==
In 2016, Badmos received the Crime Reporters Association of Nigeria (CRAN) special award, the award was presented to her in recognition of her service to the force.
