= Giuseppe Longo =

Italian mathematician

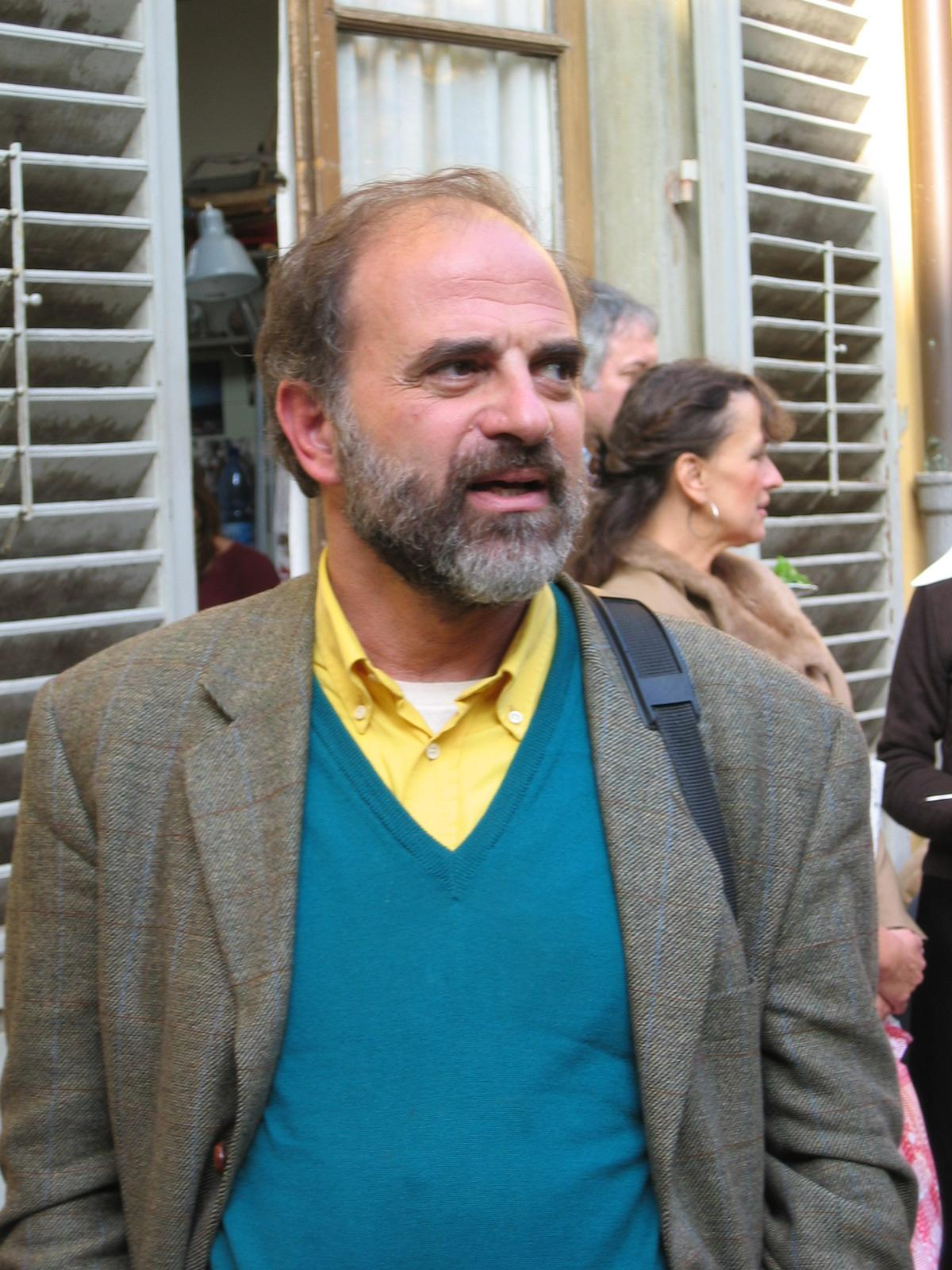
- Longo in 2003
- Born: July 23, 1947 (age 79); Rome, Italy
- Occupations: Mathematician, epistemologist, theoretical biologist, author, and academic
- Awards: National Award for young mathematicians, Unione Matematica Italiana

Academic background
- Education: Dr in Mathematics
- Alma mater: University of Pisa
- Thesis: Complessità di calcolo delle funzioni ricorsive. (1971)

Giuseppe Longo is an Italian mathematician, epistemologist, theoretical biologist, author, and academic. He is the Research Director Emeritus at Centre national de la recherche scientifique at the Cavaillès interdisciplinary center of École Normale Supérieure (ENS) in Paris.

Longo has conducted research in the fields of mathematics (focusing on the mathematics of computing) and its connections with biology, computer science, and physics. He has authored or co-authored five books entitled, Le cauchemar de Prométhée. Les sciences et leurs limites (2023), Matematica e senso. Per non divenir macchine (2022), Perspectives on Organisms: Biological Time, Symmetries and Singularities with M. Montévil (2014), Mathematics and the Natural Sciences. The Physical Singularity of Life with F. Bailly (2011), and Categories, Types and Structures. Category Theory for the working computer scientist with A. Asperti (1991). He has published more than 100 peer-reviewed articles.

Longo is a Member of Academia Europaea, and was the founder and Editor in Chief of Mathematical Structures in Computer Science from 1990 to 2015, and co-founder of the Annals of Mathematics and Philosophy.

== Education ==
Longo earned his Italian doctorate in mathematics from the University of Pisa in 1971, with a thesis titled, "Complessità di calcolo delle funzioni ricorsive". He then pursued a three-year doctoral scholarship (perfezionamento) in "Logica e calcolabilità".

== Career ==
Following his university education in Pisa, Longo began his academic career as an assistant professor in 1973 in Applied Mathematics, then associate professor of Mathematical Logic in 1981 and as full professor of Computer Science at the University of Pisa in 1987. He held four one-year appointments as young researcher at U. C. Berkeley in 1980 and M.I.T. in 1981, then as Invited Professor at Carnegie Mellon University in 1987 and Ecole Normale Supérieure in 1989.. From 2013 to 2019, he served as an adjunct professor in the School of Medicine at Tufts University in Boston, USA and as fellow, in 2014, at Institut d'Etudes Avancées, Nantes, France.

Longo held the position of Research Director at Centre National de la recherche scientifique (CNRS) from 1990 to 2012 and has been serving as a Research Director Emeritus since 2012, always affiliated at ENS, Paris.

== Research ==
During his early research career, Longo focused on analyzing the syntactic and semantic properties of fundamental functional programming languages including Lambda Calculus and Combinatory Logic. He integrated his research findings into a broader framework that explored the connections between diverse mathematical theories like recursion theory, type theory, category theory, and denotational semantics, and their practical implementation in functional languages.

He then took an interdisciplinary approach to explore the role of physics in biology to comprehend extended criticality, anti-entropy, and biological time. Later, his research was directed toward the epistemology of theoretical biology, and Interfaces of Physics, Biology, and Computing.

=== Mathematics and computing ===
Longo used an interdisciplinary research approach to explore the relationship between several mathematical theories and computer science, particularly by investigating the mathematical semantics of programming languages. His research contributed to constructing a mathematical framework regarding the theory of programming and generated results related to syntax and semantics. In related research he explored the structural properties of the set-theoretical models of lambda-calculus and established new links to Recursion in Higher Types. Collaborating with E. Moggi he characterized hereditary effective operations (HEO) and Kleene-Kreisel countable functionals. In 1986, with S. Martini, he further analyzed the computability in higher types and proved a completeness theorem for type checking using a model that was created based on the idea of recursion theory.

Longo's research in the field contributed towards the development of technical tools for polymorphism and emphasized the connections between concepts utilized in computer science and mathematical structures derived from generalized recursion, demonstration theory, and category theory. Between 1991 and 1993, he researched ad hoc polymorphism and demonstrated the characteristics of "parametricity" of second order systems as well as developed extension of classical functional systems. In addition, he proposed a novel analysis of the "invariance levels" of proofs through the concept of Prototype Proofs within Type Theory which was later applied to investigate the concrete incompleteness theorem.

=== Cognition and mathematics ===
In 1993, Longo made a thematic change in his research and elaborated the relatability of cognitive phenomena to the foundations of mathematical knowledge. He examined concepts such as mathematical continuity, infinity, computational representations and also investigated the significance of action and movement in shaping the understanding of geometric space. His work provided insights into the role of order and symmetries in the cognitive foundations of mathematics. Furthermore, he explored the relationship between the invention of perspective in painting and its connection to the foundations of geometry and the concept of infinity in mathematics.

Longo's research in the field served as the initiating point for his project titled, Geometry and Cognition. He has integrated the mathematical organization of space with the concept of causality in physics and natural science. Together with Bailly, he developed a mathematical theory that focused on understanding the notions of complexity and information within geometric structures and evaluated the geometry associated with different levels of the organization. In addition, he initiated a team at LIENS called Complexity and Morphological Information which has been responsible for projects like "Physical singularities and effective computability".

=== Epistemology and theoretical biology ===
Longo has researched theoretical biology in collaboration with biologists and philosophers of biology. His work includes the exploration of the concept of simplexity, which refers to the initiation of simple processes through complex pathways and the study of association between randomness and the growth of biological organization in ontogenesis and evolution, which originated the notion of anti-entropy, following a 2009 paper with Bailly. Additionally, he introduced the concepts of differential causality and enablement to understand causality in biology and argued that a significant aspect of biological evolution involves the continuous alteration of the relevant phase space. His investigations have led to insights on the default state of cells characterized by proliferation, variation, and motility, as well as the proposal of a framing principle involving non-identical iterations of morphogenetic processes. In 2017, he further explored the dependence of present and future dynamics of life on history, in comparison with path dependence in physics as part of a theoretical framework to organize principles for biological thinking and experimenting. Furthermore, he criticized the current uses of the notion of information in biology, within the framework of exploring the relationship between science and technology.

== Awards and honors ==
- 1974 – National Award for young mathematicians, Unione Matematica Italiana
- 1992 – Member, Academia Europaea, the European Academy of Sciences

== Bibliography ==
=== Books ===
- Categories, types, and structures (1990) ISBN 978-0262011259
- Mathematics and the Natural Sciences: The Physical Singularity of Life (2011) ISBN 978-1848166936
- Perspectives on Organisms: Biological time, Symmetries and Singularities (2014) ISBN 978-3642359378
- Matematica e senso. Per non divenir macchine (2022) ISBN 978-8857587363
- Le cauchemar de Prométhée. Les sciences et leurs limites (2023) ISBN 978-2130843085

=== Selected articles ===
- Barendregt, H. P., & Longo, G. (1980). Equality of lambda terms in the model T omega. JR Hindley; JP Seldin (eds.), To HB Curry: essays on combinatory logic, lambda calculus and formalism, 303–337.
- Longo, G., & Moggi, E. (1990). A category-theoretic characterization of functional completeness. Theoretical Computer Science, 70(2), 193–211.
- Longo, G. (2002, February). On the proofs of some formally unprovable propositions and Prototype Proofs in Type Theory. In Types for Proofs and Programs: International Workshop, TYPES 2000 Durham, UK, December 8–12, 2000 Selected Papers (pp. 160–180). Berlin, Heidelberg: Springer Berlin Heidelberg. (revised: in Philosophia Mathematica, 19(3): 255–280, 2011)
- Bailly, F., & Longo, G. (2007). Randomness and determinism in the interplay between the continuum and the discrete. Mathematical Structures in Computer Science, 17(2), 289–305.
- Bailly, F., Longo, G., & Montevil, M. (2011). A 2-dimensional geometry for biological time. Progress in Biophysics and Molecular Biology, 106(3), 474–484.
- Buiatti, M., Longo, G. (2013 ) Randomness and Multi-level Interactions in Biology. Theory in Biosciences, vol. 132, n. 3:139–158.
- Longo, G. (2018 ) How Future Depends on Past Histories and Rare Events in Systems of Life, Foundations of Science, (DOI), 23 (3):443–474.
- Longo, G. (2019). Interfaces of incompleteness. Systemics of Incompleteness and Quasi-systems, 3–55.
- Longo, G., & Longo, S. (2021). Réinventer le corps et l'espace. in "In difesa dell'umano", 2021
