= Ken Kamoche =

Kenyan writer and academic

- Born: Kambu district, Kenya
- Education: University of Nairobi (BCom); University of Oxford (MPhil, DPhil)
- Occupations: Academic, novelist, short-story writer
- Writing career
- Language: English
- Period: 2007–present
- Genres: Novels, short stories
- Notable works: A Fragile Hope (2007); Black Ghosts (2013); Clan of Warriors (2024)
- Notable awards: Jomo Kenyatta Prize for Literature (2026)

Ken Kamoche, who also publishes as Ken N. Kamoche, is a Kenyan academic, novelist and short-story writer. He is a professor of human resource management and organisation studies at the University of Nottingham and head of the Africa Research Group. His research areas cover knowledge management, organisational improvisation and business relations between Africa and Asia.

His fiction consists of the short story collection A Fragile Hope as well as the novels Black Ghosts and Clan of Warriors. In 2008, A Fragile Hope was shortlisted for the Commonwealth Writers' Prize for Best First Book Award. In 2026, Clan of Warriors won the English Adult Category of the Jomo Kenyatta Prize for Literature.

== Early life and education ==
The University of Nairobi, where Kamoche completed his undergraduate studies.

Kamoche was born and raised in Kenya. He went to Nairobi School, where he was involved in drama and wrote plays and poetry. His early experiences that drew him to writing included childhood storytelling and his school experiences; he spoke about this in an oral history interview with The Rhodes Trust.

He holds a Bachelor of Commerce degree from the University of Nairobi with a major in accounting and finance. Before graduating, he did an internship at an engineering company in Gdańsk, Poland. In 1988, he was awarded a Rhodes Scholarship and attended the University of Oxford. Based at St Catherine's College, he studied management at Templeton College and completed an MPhil and a DPhil.

== Academic career ==
The Trent Building at the University of Nottingham, where Kamoche has served as a professor.

Kamoche began his academic career at the University of Birmingham in 1992. He later served as associate professor at City University of Hong Kong and professor at Nottingham Trent University. He became a professor at the University of Nottingham Business School in 2013.

His research areas include human resource management, talent and knowledge management, organisational improvisation, and management in emerging economies. He has also done research on business relations between Africa and Asia. His academic publications have been featured in journals such as Human Relations, Journal of Management Studies, Organization Studies and Journal of International Business Studies.

Kamoche's work with Kuok Kei Law examined bamboo scaffolders in Hong Kong. Their study was based on interviews with scaffolders and contractors and examined how they perceived risk at work and the impact of social stigma. It discovered that employees used an image of toughness and fearlessness to protect the value of their skills and occupation.

In 2015–2016, Kamoche's research project, which involved a comparative study of tacit knowledge and risk assessment across Africa and Asia, received £9,998 in funding from the British Academy. This was a joint grant with the Society for the Advancement of Management Studies.

Kamoche is the director of the Africa Research Group, where he has worked on research connections between scholars in Africa and other parts of the world. During a lecture at Makerere University in March 2026, he explained that the group was involved in researcher mentoring, supervision of doctoral students, co-authoring publications and applications for research funding. He was appointed as a visiting professor at Universiti Teknologi Malaysia, where he will serve until March 2027 at the Faculty of Management in June 2026.

== Literary career ==
=== Short stories and early writing ===
While working and living in Hong Kong, Kamoche has honed his fiction writing. In his Rhodes Trust oral history interview, he described participating in a writing group that held monthly meetings to talk about each other's work. His stories have been published in Ambit, Wasafiri, Kunapipi and New York Stories among other publications. They have also been featured in anthologies, including Hong Kong ID, Dreams, Miracles and Jazz, One World and New Writing from Africa 2009.

In 2007, Salt published a collection of short stories, A Fragile Hope. The stories are set in Kenya and cities such as London, Copenhagen, Hong Kong, Bangkok and Shanghai. They deal with relationships, family conflict, corruption, discrimination and personal hopes. Many of them had previously been published in literary magazines.

In 2007, he won second prize in the Olaudah Equiano Prize for Fiction for his story, 'A Glimpse of Life'. The organiser declared that Kamoche was the second prize winner and Chibo Onyeji the overall winner. World Literature Today featured Kamoche's "Secondhand Wife" in its September 2011 issue.

=== Novels ===
True Warriors was in circulation by 2011, when Storymoja announced a book-signing event in Nairobi. The novel unfolds the story of Chege, a young Kenyan whose family loses their land when their brother is accused of treason after the 1982 coup attempt. Chege studies abroad and is accused of a financial scandal when he returns to Kenya. An earlier version of True Warriors appeared in the British Council magazine Crossing Borders.

Black Ghosts is about Dan Chiponda, a Zimbabwean student who goes to China and then resides in Hong Kong. His experiences involve racial discrimination, marriage, business challenges, and relations with Chinese investors looking to invest in Africa. The historical background of the novel is the unrest of 1988 among the African students in Nanjing. An East African Educational Publishers issue is recorded as having been published in 2013.

Clan of Warriors was launched by East African Educational Publishers in August 2024. The novel follows Chege and his family after his brother's conviction following the 1982 coup attempt. The novel tells a story that links family strife to political repression and a financial scandal. It won the 2026 Jomo Kenyatta Prize for Literature in the English Adult Category.

The Parting Clouds, written by Kamoche and published by East African Educational Publishers, was selected in February 2026 to be part of the list of approved literature set books for senior school (Kinyanjui, 2026) in Kenya's Ministry of Education.

=== Themes and critical reception ===
Scholarly studies of Black Ghosts have examined migration, belonging, racial identity and relations between Africans and Chinese people. Uchenna P. Vasser made a comparison of the novel to Ufrieda Ho's Paper Sons and Daughters on the theme of displacement and the lives of migrant communities. Tom Odhiambo and Joseph Kwanya discussed personal relations and the political and economic relations between Africa and China.

Helmi Ben Meriem did a study in 2016 that discussed "Secondhand Wife" and A Naked Needle by Nuruddin Farah. He studied the conflict between personal freedom and communal regulation of marriage and sexuality. His reading of Kamoche's story centred on a widow going to marry her brother-in-law.

Reviewing Black Ghosts in The Standard, Abenea Ndago praised its international scope. However, he questioned its suggestion, through a character, that Chinese business interests could be separated from politics. In an ensuing review, Jennifer Muchiri read the novel as a critique of exploitation and of African leaders who facilitated investors' access to public resources.

== Journalism and other writing ==
Kamoche has published newspaper columns and literary commentaries. His biographical profile as a contributor in the Cha: An Asian Literary Journal (2008) listed him as a columnist for the Sunday Nation newspaper in Kenya, and his topics of interest included corruption in Asia and events in Zimbabwe. In September 2011, he contributed "What to read now: Kenya" to World Literature Today, discussing books by Ngũgĩ wa Thiong'o, Meja Mwangi and Michela Wrong.

== Awards and recognition ==
Year	Award	Work	Result
2007	Frank O'Connor International Short Story Award	A Fragile Hope	Longlisted
2007	Olaudah Equiano Prize for Fiction	"A Glimpse of Life"	Second prize
2008	Commonwealth Writers' Prize, Best First Book Award	A Fragile Hope	Shortlisted
2026	Jomo Kenyatta Prize for Literature, English Adult Category	Clan of Warriors	Winner

== Selected works ==
=== Fiction ===
- A Fragile Hope (2007), short-story collection, Salt.
- True Warriors (2011), novel.
- Black Ghosts (2013 EAEP edition), novel, East African Educational Publishers.
- Clan of Warriors (launched in 2024), novel, East African Educational Publishers.
- The Parting Clouds, novel, East African Educational Publishers.

=== Academic books ===
Kamoche has authored and co-edited the following academic books.

Year	Title	Role
2000	Sociological Paradigms and Human Resources: An African Context	Author
2001	Understanding Human Resource Management	Author
2002	Organizational Improvisation	Co-editor
2004	Managing Human Resources in Africa	Co-editor
2013	Effective People Management in Africa	Co-editor
2024	Routledge Handbook of Chinese Business and Management	Co-editor
