= Chika Unigwe =

Nigerian-born Igbo novelist (born 1974)

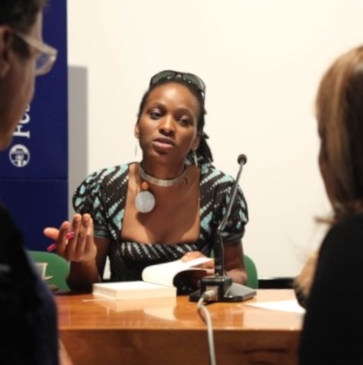
- Born: Chika Nina Unigwe; 12 June 1974 (age 52); Enugu, Nigeria
- Education: University of Nigeria, Nsukka (BA); KU Leuven (MA); University of Leiden (PhD)
- Occupation: Novelist
- Writing career
- Language: English, Dutch
- Notable work: On Black Sisters' Street (2009)
- Notable awards: Nigeria Prize for Literature

Chika Nina Unigwe // (born 12 June 1974) is a Nigerian-born Igbo novelist who writes in English and Dutch. She was the winner of the Nigeria Prize for Literature in 2012 for her novel On Black Sisters' Street. In April 2014, she was selected for the Hay Festival's Africa39 list of 39 Sub-Saharan African writers aged under 40. She is on the Board of Trustees of pan-African literary initiative Writivism, and set up the Awele Creative Trust in Nigeria to support young writers. She has served as a Man Booker International judge and chair of the judges for the Caine Prize for African Writing. In 2023, she was made a Knight of the Order of the Crown (Belgium).

Previously based in Belgium, she now lives in the United States.

== Biography ==
Chika Unigwe was born in 1974 in Enugu, the capital city of Enugu State, southeastern Nigeria, the sixth of her parents' seven children. She attended secondary school at Federal Government Girls' college in Abuja and obtained a BA in English in the University of Nigeria, Nsukka (UNN) in 1995. In 1996, she earned an MA degree in English from the KU Leuven (KUL, the Catholic University of Leuven). She has a Ph.D. in Literature (2004) from the University of Leiden in the Netherlands. She writes in English and Dutch.

Unigwe formerly lived in Turnhout, Belgium, with her husband and four children. In addition to writing, she sat on the Turnhout town council and taught Flemish to immigrants. She emigrated to the United States in 2013. She lives in Atlanta, Georgia, where she is Professor of Creative Writing at Georgia College & State University.

== Career ==
=== Novels and short stories ===
In 2003, (Note: The announcement was broadcast in 2003 and this is usually referred to as the 2003 competition, although the World Service itself refers to it as the 2002 competition.) while a student in Belgium, Unigwe won the BBC World Service Short Story Competition for her story "Borrowed Smile". (Note: Unigwe is listed as Belgian in the results announcement.) The story was later published in Wasafiri. Also in 2003, she won an honourable mention in the Commonwealth Short Story Competition for her story "Weathered Smiles" and a VDAB-Prijs, a Flemish literary prize for writers under 30, for her first short story in Dutch, "De Smaak van Sneeuw" (the taste of snow). In 2004, her story "A Secret" was shortlisted for the Caine Prize for African Writing. In the same year, her short story "Dreams" made the top 10 of the Million Writers Award for best online fiction. In 2005, she won third place in the Olaudah Equiano Prize for Fiction, an award for short stories by Africans living abroad, with her story "Confetti, Glitter, and Ash". Her early short fiction also appeared in journals including Eclectica, Moving Worlds, Per Contra, and Litro.

Unigwe's first novel, De Feniks (The Phoenix), was published in Dutch in September 2005 by Meulenhoff and Manteau. Telling of a young Nigerian woman living in a northern Belgian town who is diagnosed with cancer, it is the first book of fiction written by a Flemish author of African origin. It was shortlisted for the Vrouw en Kultuur debuutprijs for the best first novel by a female writer. In 2007 it was shortlisted for the Literatuurprijs Gerard Walschap, awarded to Dutch or Flemish authors in the early stages of their career.

Unigwe's second novel, Fata Morgana, was published in Dutch in 2008. It was published in Unigwe's own English version as On Black Sisters' Street by Jonathan Cape in 2009 and Random House in 2011. The novel's protagonists are four African prostitutes living and working in Antwerp. Praising the novel in The Guardian, Zukiswa Wanner rated Unigwe as one of the "top five African writers". In 2012, On Black Sisters' Street won the Nigeria Prize for Literature, Africa's largest literary prize at $100,000. The shortlist that year also included Olushola Olugbesan's Only A Canvass and Ngozi Achebe's Onaedo: The Blacksmith's Daughter. Unigwe was the second diaspora winner.

Her 2012 novel, Night Dancer, is set in Nigeria and spans the years from the 1970s to the 2010s. The title comes from an Acholi word for a woman who does not act like a woman. The story concerns Ezi, who becomes a social outcast when she leaves her husband, her daughter Adamma, who gradually comes to terms with her mother's actions, and Rapu, the teenage maid who bears Ezi's husband a son and eventually rises above her circumstances. The novel was shortlisted for the Nigeria Prize for Literature in 2016. The winner was subsequently announced as Abubakar Adam Ibrahim.

In 2014, she published Zwarte Messias (Black Messiah), a novel about Olaudah Equiano. This was her second fictional engagement with Equiano, having written a children's book about him in the late 1990s.

In 2019, Unigwe published Better Never Than Late, a collection of linked short stories about Nigerian immigrants in Belgium, with Cassava Republic Press.

Unigwe was included in the 2019 anthology New Daughters of Africa. A follow-up to the original 1992 anthology Daughters of Africa, it is a compilation of orature and literature by more than 200 women from Africa and the African diaspora, and like the earlier anthology, is edited and introduced by Margaret Busby. New Daughters of Africa was nominated for the NAACP Awards for Outstanding Literary Work.

In 2020, Unigwe contributed "Two Happy Meals", to The middle of a sentence, an anthology of very short fiction featuring commissions from contemporary writers, new submissions, and selections from literature.

In 2021, Unigwe was shortlisted for the Dzanc Books Diverse Voices Award.

Unigwe published her most recent novel, The Middle Daughter, in 2023. Set in Enugu and Atlanta, it reimagines the myth of Hades and Persephone through middle daughter Nani's marriage to preacher Ephraim. (Note: Some extracts from this novel had previously been published under the title Leaving Meshach.) In 2025, the novel was announced as a finalist for the Townsend Prize for Fiction, given for outstanding works by Georgia writers.

Unigwe has also published children's books and poetry.

=== Journalism, academia and literary activism ===
Unigwe attended the 2013 Adelaide festival in Australia, where she met an Aboriginal chief and an Aboriginal writer. She wrote an article about this experience, "what I'm thinking about ... forgiveness and healing". She has also written on Boko Haram, Nigerian religious tradition, and environmental activism. In November 2020, she began writing a weekly column for Nigeria's Daily Trust.

Unigwe sits on the Board of Trustees of pan-African literary initiative Writivism, and set up the Awele Creative Trust in Nigeria to support young writers. In April 2014, she was selected for the Festival's Africa39 list of 39 sub-Saharan African writers aged under 40 with potential and talent to define future trends in Africa.

In autumn 2014, the University of Tübingen welcomed Unigwe and her fellow authors Taiye Selasi, Priya Basil and Nii Ayikwei Parkes to the year's Writers' Lectureship, all of them authors representing what Selasi calls Afropolitan literature.

In 2016, Unigwe was appointed as the Bonderman Professor of Creative Writing at Brown University in Providence, Rhode Island.

In 2017, she served as a Man Booker International judge. From 2017 to 2019, she was a visiting professor at Emory University, Atlanta, Georgia.

In July 2020, Unigwe was appointed a professor of creative writing at Georgia College & State University. She currently serves as the fiction editor for their MFA program's literary journal Arts & Letters.

In 2023, Unigwe was knighted into the Order of the Crown by the Belgian Government for her contributions to literature and services to the Belgian nation. On the same occasion, she was also awarded the Proclamation/Oorkonde by the Christoffel Plantin Fonds, an award presented to Belgian nationals who have made an exceptional contribution to the prestige and image of Belgium abroad.

In April 2024, she was appointed chair of the Judges for the Caine Prize for African Writing.

== Fellowships ==
- 2007: Unesco-Aschberg Fellowship for creative writing
- 2009: Rockefeller Foundation Fellowship (Bellagio Centre, Italy)
- 2011: HALD Fellowship (HALD Centre, Denmark)
- 2011 and 2016: Writing Fellowship at the Ledig House (Omi NY, USA)
- 2013: Writing Fellowship at Cove Park (Scotland)
- 2014: Writer-in-Residence, Haverford College (Philadelphia PA, USA)
- 2014: Sylt Fellowship for African Writers

== Works ==
=== Novels ===
- The Phoenix. Lagos: Farafina Publishers, 2007. ISBN 978-978-48013-6-2
- On Black Sisters’ Street (translation of Fata Morgana). London: Jonathan Cape, 2009. ISBN 978-0-224-08530-4
- Night Dancer. London: Jonathan Cape, 2012. ISBN 978-0-224-09383-5
- Black Messiah (2014)
- The Middle Daughter. Dzanc Books, 2023. ISBN 9781950539468

=== Short stories ===
- Better Never Than Late. Cassava Republic Press, 2019. ISBN 978-1911115540

=== Poetry ===
- Tear Drops, Enugu: Richardson Publishers, 1993.
- Born in Nigeria, Enugu: Onyx Publishers, 1995.

=== For children ===
- A Rainbow for Dinner. Oxford: Macmillan, 2002. ISBN 978-0-333-95588-8
- Ije at School. Oxford: Macmillan, 2003
- Obioma Plays Football. Cassava Republic Press, 2022. ISBN 978-1913175368

=== Dissertation ===
- In the Shadow of Ala; Igbo women's writing as an act of righting. Dissertation, Leiden University, 2004.

=== Anthologies ===
- Zwart, Amsterdam: Uitgeverij Atlas Contact, 2018. A collection of stories and essays in Dutch, collected and edited by Vamba Sherif and Ebissé Rouw. ISBN 978-90-254-5154-7. Contains a story by Unigwe: Anekdotes om rond de tafel te vertellen.
- The Middle Of A Sentence: Short Prose Anthology. The Common Breath, 2020. ISBN 9781916064133
