= Roc Llop i Convalia =

Catalan anarchist and writer (1908–1997)

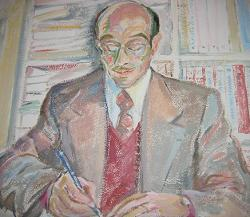
Roc Llop i Convalia

Roc Llop i Convalia (1908–1997) was a Catalan trade unionist, teacher, and editor. A member of the Confederación Nacional del Trabajo, he was jailed in October 1934. He lived in France during his exile after the Spanish Civil War where he edited the publication Terra Lliure. He also spent five years in the Nazi Mauthausen-Gusen concentration camp.

== Works ==
- Poemes de llum i tenebra. Choisy-le-Roi: Imprimerie des Gondoles, 1967
- Mission ratée de l'home sur terre
- Contes negres de les vores del Danubi
- Mission Ratée de l'Home sur Terre, 1979.
- Tríptic de l'amor i proses. Choisy-le-Roi: Imprimerie des Gondoles, 1986

== See also ==
- Anarchism in Spain
