= Jean McNeil =

Canadian fiction and travel author

Jean McNeil, born 1968, is a Canadian fiction and travel author. She is a Reader in Creative Writing and co-convenor of the MA in Creative Writing (Prose Fiction) at the University of East Anglia.

She grew up on Cape Breton Island in Nova Scotia. She presently lives in London, England.

== Awards and recognition ==
- Winner, Grand Prize and Adventure Travel category at the Banff Mountain Film Festival Book Awards Book Competition for Ice Diaries: an Antarctic Memoir, 2016.
- Nominated for a Canadian National Magazine Award for Ice Diaries: A Climate Change Memoir, (extract from book in progress) 2013.
- Awarded a Canada Council Grant for the Arts, 2013.
- Finalist, Prism International prize for creative non-fiction, for The Skeleton Coast, Vancouver, Canada, 2013.
- Nominated for the 2013 Pushcart Prize, USA for Ice Diaries, published 2012.
- Winner, Prism International prize for creative non-fiction, for Ice Diaries: A Climate Change Memoir, Vancouver, Canada, 2012.
- Shortlisted for the BBC/AHRC New Generation Thinkers scheme, 2012.
- Winner, Walkopedia travel writing award, 2011.
- Shortlisted, Metcalfe-Rooke award for an unpublished novel manuscript, for Fire on the Mountain, 2011.
- Awarded British Antarctic Survey/Arts Council England International Fellowship to Antarctica, 2005
- Nominated, Governor General's Award for English-language fiction, Canada, 2003
- Awarded Canada Council Award for the Arts, 2002.
- Awarded London Arts Board Award for the Arts, 1997.
- Shortlisted, Journey Prize for short fiction (Canada), 1997.
- Winner, Prism International short story competition, 1997.

== Bibliography ==
- Hunting Down Home (UK: Phoenix 1996, US: Milkweed Editions 1999) ISBN 978-1-57131-026-2
- Nights in a Foreign Country (2000) ISBN 1-86159-186-1
- Costa Rica (2001) ISBN 1-85828-136-9
- Private View (2002) ISBN 1-86159-188-8
- The Interpreter of Silences (2006) ISBN 1-55278-563-7
- The Ice Lovers (2009) ISBN 978-1-55278-802-8
- Night Orders: Poems from Antarctica and the Arctic (2011) ISBN 978-1-906613-39-6
- Ice Diaries: an Antarctic Memoir (2016) ISBN 978-1-77041-318-4
- The Dhow House (2016) ISBN 978-1785079443
- Fire on the Mountain (2018) ISBN 978-1785078996
