= Russell Celyn Jones =

British writer and academic (born 1952)

Russell Celyn Jones is a British writer and Emeritus Professor, Birkbeck, University of London. Jones was born in London and brought up in Swansea, Wales. He has written novels, mostly focused on crime and issues of guilt and morality, and also teaches creative writing. He may be best known for Ten Seconds from the Sun about the rehabilitation of a child murderer. Jones received his B.A. degree from University College London and his M.F.A. from the University of Iowa. He has three children: Rebecca, Rachel, and Benjamin.

== Books ==
=== Soldiers and Innocents ===
His first novel, Soldiers and Innocents (1990) is about a father and son who both pursued military careers, the former in North Africa in World War II, the latter in the more morally complex setting of the Northern Irish Troubles. The novel was made into a six-part series for BBC Radio 4 and won the David Higham Prize.

=== The Eros Hunter ===
The Eros Hunter is a 1998 crime novel about police investigating paedophilia in London. The Independent found its oblique, subtle approach to be impressive, while conceding that some crime fans may prefer more direct thrills.

=== Surface Tension ===
His novel Surface Tension (2001) has central characters Mark and Geena, brother and sister, whose parents fled Apartheid-era South Africa. After finding out that Geena was adopted they return to South Africa to uncover their family secrets. The Guardian praised it for both its style and its themes of identity, morality, and power.

=== Ten Seconds from the Sun ===
Ten Seconds from the Sun (2005) is a novel about a Thames river tug boat captain who as a 12-year-old was sent to jail for murder but on completing his sentence was released and allowed to rejoin society, until a car accident brings him together with a figure from his past, his former partner in crime and half-sister Celestine. The Observer found it at once a "clever psychological thriller" and a deeper reflection on guilt, memory, truth, and other issues. The Telegraph found it slightly overburdened by research but a "tightly written" exploration of a societal taboo. The novel won the Weishanhu Prize in China for the best foreign novel.

=== The Ninth Wave ===
The Welsh collection of tales the Mabinogion provides the raw material for The Ninth Wave (2009), part of a series in which publisher Seren asked writers to reinterpret the classic Welsh stories. Celyn Jones updates "Pwyll, Lord of Dyfed" to an alternate reality where modern consumerism and recreational drugs exist alongside mounted knights.

== Selected bibliography ==
- Soldiers and Innocents (1990)
- Small Times (1992)
- An Interference of the Light (1995)
- The Eros Hunter (1998)
- Surface Tension (2001)
- Second Nature (2005)
- Ten Seconds from the Sun (2005)
- The Ninth Wave (New Stories from the Mabinogion) (2009)
- Writing Fiction (2010)
