= José Carlos Llop =

Spanish writer

- Born: 1956 (age 69–70); Palma de Majorca
- Occupation: Writer
- Writing career
- Genres: Poetry and plays to essays and novels
- Notable work: Solstice
- Notable awards: Prix Laure Bataillon

José Carlos Llop (born 1956) is a Spanish writer. He was born in Palma de Mallorca. He lives and works in Palma, where he runs the Lluís Alemany library.

A prolific writer, he has published more than thirty books, spanning a range of genres from poetry and plays to essays and novels. His work has been translated extensively into French, principally by Edmond Raillard. Llop is one of the leading Spanish diarists of his generation, and has published five volumes of journals so far. As a translator, Llop has translated the works of Derek Walcott and Llorenç Villalonga among others. He has won a number of literary prizes, for example, his novel Solstice (2016) won the prix Laure Bataillon in 2017 for both author and translator.

== English translations ==
The Stein Report (El informe Stein), translated by Howard Curtis, Hispabooks, 2014
