= Dolapo Oni =

Nigerian TV host

- Born: Lagos
- Education: University of Bristol, United Kingdom
- Occupations: TV host, producer, actress.
- Spouse: Adegbite Sijuwade

Dolapo Oni, sometimes referred as Marcy Dolapo Oni is a Nigerian actress, TV presenter, mentor and MC.

== Early life ==
Oni is the youngest of four children of her family. She spent 20 years living in the United Kingdom before she returned to Nigeria in 2010. As a 10 year old, she wanted to be an actress after she saw Andrew Lloyd Webber's musical, Aspects of Love, at The Oxford Playhouse.

She had her secondary education at Headington School, a girls' fee-paying school in Oxford, England, where she was the first black head girl. She attended the University of Bristol where she obtained a degree in chemistry.

== Career ==
Oni started acting while she was living in the United Kingdom, after completing her university degree, by going to drama school. She secured a place to study at Academy of Live and Recorded Arts (ALRA) in Wandsworth, London, where she acted in numerous plays including Walking Waterfall by Nii Ayikwei Parkes, William Shakespeare's A Midsummer Night's Dream, In Time by Bola Agbaje, God is a DJ and Iya-Ile (The First Wife by Oladipo Agboluaje. She once received the Dorothy L. Sayers Drama Award.

Oni made her TV debut in the UK in the BBC mini-series Vexed, before she moved back to Nigeria.

Her first job was in Nigeria shortly after her return, at Studio 53 Extra where she spent three years learning about TV presenting and production. She left Studio 53 Extra at almost the same time as she left Moments with Mo to start her own show, The Marcy Project.

She has presented on the MNET show, 53 Extra (formerly Studio 53 Extra) on Africa Magic, before co-hosting Moments with Mo on Ebony Life TV. She starred in Diary of a Lagos Girl and Desperate Housewives Africa.

Oni was involved with the panel show You Wanna Get Married in the United Kingdom. She is the producer of Diary of a Lagos Girl. Among her role models in the film industry are Mrs. Biola Alabi and Mrs.Bolanle-Austen Peters.

== Personal life ==
She married Prince Adegbite Sijuwade on 2 August 2015. She had her first child in 2017.
