= Susan Elderkin =

English author

Susan Elderkin (born 1968 in Crawley) is an English author of two critically acclaimed novels, her first, Sunset Over Chocolate Mountains won a Betty Trask Prize and was shortlisted for the Orange Prize for Fiction, her second, The Voices was shortlisted for the Ondaatje Prize and longlisted for the International Dublin Literary Award. She was one of Granta Magazine's 20 Best Young British Novelists in 2003 and won the 2007 Society of Authors Travel Award. She is the author, with Ella Berthoud, of The Novel Cure: An A-Z of Literary Remedies and The Story Cure: Books to Keep Kids Happy, Healthy and Wise.

== Life ==
Elderkin grew up in Leatherhead, Surrey and studied English at Downing College, Cambridge then an MA on the UEA Creative Writing Course taught by Malcolm Bradbury and Rose Tremain. She went on to become a travel writer, journalist and reviewer, mainly for the Financial Times and to teach creative writing herself at Goldsmiths College, Birkbeck, University of London, City University London, the Arvon Foundation and Manchester University. She has also worked as an ice-cream seller and taught English at a Slovak shoe factory. She lives between Somerset and America with her partner and young son and is working on adapting her first novel for film. She is a bibliotherapist at The School of Life. Together with fellow bibliotherapist Ella Berthoud, she is the author of two books about bibliotherapy, The Novel Cure and The Story Cure (both published by Canongate).

== Bibliography ==
=== Novels ===
- Sunset Over Chocolate Mountains (2000)
- The Voices (2003) - The story, set in the western Australian outback, is about a boy who is found ten years after disappearing into the Outback following ghostly voices.

=== Non-fiction ===
- The Novel Cure: An A-Z of Literary Remedies (2013) - "An exuberant pageant of literary fiction and a celebration of the possibilities of the novel."
- The Story Cure: Books to Keep Kids Happy, Healthy and Wise (2016) - "A treasure trove of practical, stimulating knowledge for anyone faced with the daunting and joyous task of matching the right book to the right child. A magical resource".

=== Short stories ===
- "This One (or How The Blackthorn Got Its Flowers)" (2011) - appears in Why Willows Weep: Contemporary Tales from the Woods, published by IndieBooks in association with The Woodland Trust
