= Priya Basil =

British author and political activist

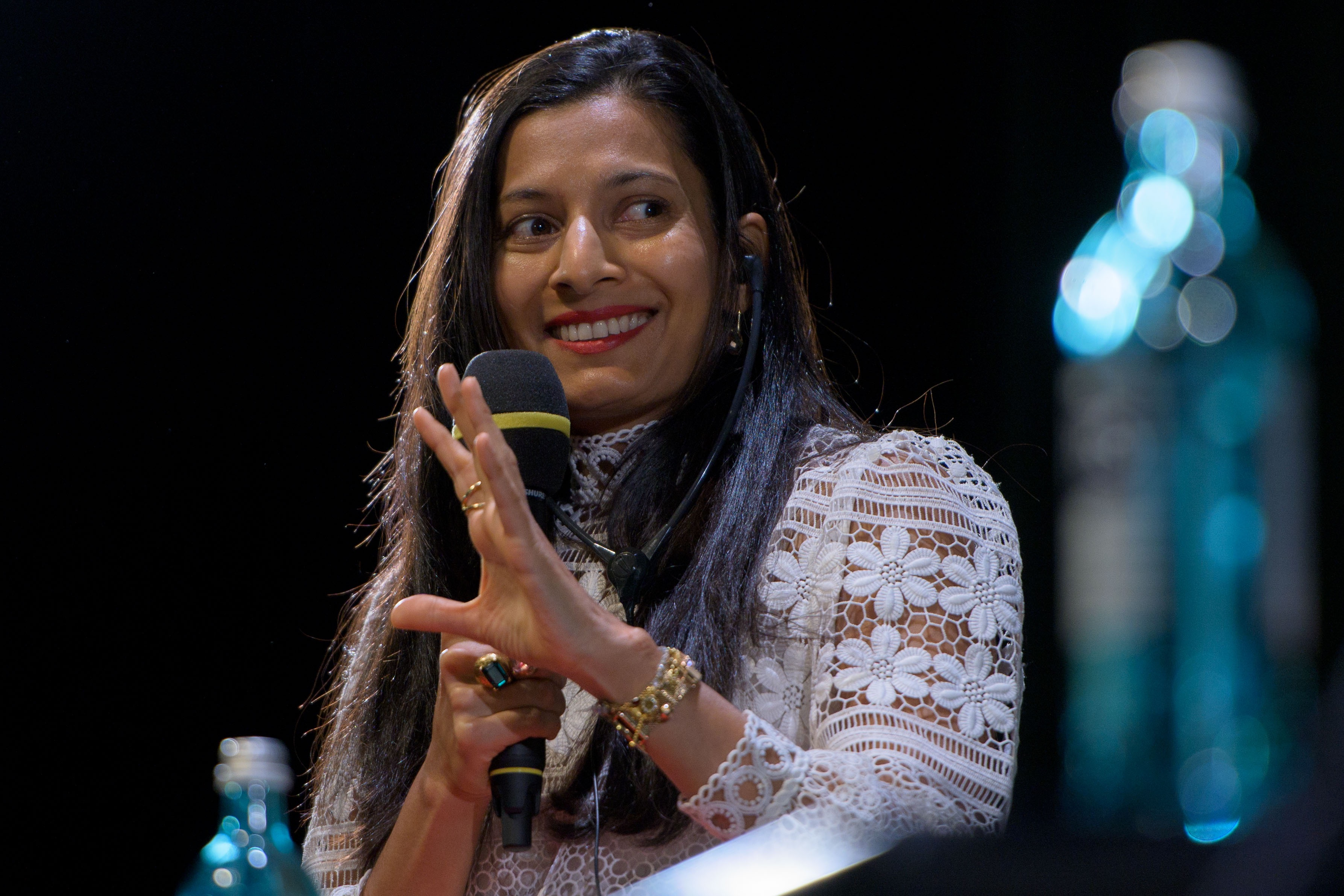
- Basil, 2019
- Born: 27 March 1977 (age 49); London, United Kingdom
- Occupation: Novelist
- Writing career
- Period: 2007–present
- Movement: Realism

Priya Basil (born 1977 in London, England) is a British and German author and political activist. Her work has been translated into over half a dozen languages, and her first novel was shortlisted for the Commonwealth Writers' Prize. She is co-founder and board member of WIR MACHEN DAS, an organisation working with refugees and migrants. Basil is a member of the advisory board of the European Center for Constitutional and Human Rights. She has conceptualised and curated projects for various institutions including the Goethe-Institut , the Literarisches Colloquium Berlin and the International Literature Festival Berlin . Priya was curator of Europe's Kitchen , a multidisciplinary, Europe-wide series of events that she conceptualized with the Goethe-Institute to mark Germany's EU Council Presidency from July to December 2020. Since 2021, Priya Basil is curator of the ongoing event series Objects Talk Back at the Humboldt Forum, Berlin. And she is also editor of a related book series .

From 2021 to 2023 Basil was International Writer in Residence for Mindscapes, a project of the Wellcome Trust UK, devoted to transforming how we understand, talk about and treat mental health. As part of this Priya undertook a research journey which spanned six continents to learn about different understandings of well-being and practices of healing. In 2024, Basil was writer in residence with Canopy, a project by Wellcome intended to put health at the centre of climate action.

== Writing ==
Her first novel, Ishq and Mushq, was published in 2007. Ishq and Mushq is a family saga which illuminates the problem of cultural identity for immigrants over several generations, and raises questions of memory, exile and self-rediscovery. Ishq and Mushq came second in the World Book Day "Book to Talk About 2008" competition. The novel was also short-listed for a Commonwealth Writers' Prize, and long-listed for the Dylan Thomas Prize and the International Dublin Literary Award.

Her second novel, The Obscure Logic of the Heart, was published in June 2010. It tells the love story of the Muslim Lina and the secular Kenyan architecture student, Anil, against a background of socio-political problems.

Basil's novella Strangers on the 16:02 was published in 2011.

Her book Be My Guest: Reflections on Food, Community and the meaning of Generosity, was one of The Observer's Best Books of 2019, and was selected as non-fiction book of the year by Deutschlandfunk Kultur in Germany. Her book In Us and Now, Becoming Feminist was published in German translation (Im Wir und Jetzt, Feministin werden) with Suhrkamp in 2021.

In autumn 2014, Basil took up the Writers' Lectureship at the University of Tübingen. She shared the honour with Chika Unigwe.

Basil is for 2025/26 at The Centre for Advanced Study inherit.heritage in transformation, a Käte Hamburger Kolleg based at the Humboldt-Universität zu Berlin, a fellow.

Basil's other writings have been published in The Guardian, Die Zeit and the Asia Literary Review. She is a contributor to Lettre International, a German-language literary magazine. Her themes include art, Europe, democracy, migration and (neo-)colonialism.

== Political work ==
In 2010, Basil co-founded Authors for Peace. with the journalist Matt Aufderhorst. It was intended to be a platform from which writers can actively use literature in different ways to promote peace. The first event by Authors for Peace took place on 21 September 2010, the UN's International Day of Peace. With the support of the International Literature Festival Berlin, Priya hosted a 24hour-live-online-reading by 80 authors from all over the world.

Basil is one of the initiators of 'Writers Against Mass Surveillance', a worldwide movement that was launched on 10 December 2013. She is one of the group of seven international writers who wrote the appeal, gathered the first 560 signatures, and organized the global launch of the appeal.

Basil spoke at Re:publica Berlin 2014, and has published articles about the threat mass surveillance poses to democracy and individual freedom, including in the Frankfurter Allgemeine Zeitung, Der Tagesspiegel and the Danish newspaper Politiken.

== Personal life ==
Basil now lives in Berlin. Wired called her "a British, Kenyan, Indian, German-resident fiction-writer. Priya is another of those contemporary novelists whose life wouldn't do within a novel, because it's simply too implausible".

== Bibliography ==
- Ishq and Mushq, 2007 (Hardback ISBN 0-385-61142-0, Paperback ISBN 0-552-77384-0)
- The Obscure Logic of the Heart, 2010 (Trade Paperback ISBN 0-385-61145-5; Paperback ISBN 0-552-77385-9 and ISBN 978-0-552-77385-0)
- Strangers on the 16:02, 2011 (Paperback ISBN 978-0-552-77705-6)
- Erzählte Wirklichkeiten: Tübinger Poetik Dozentur 2014 (Poetics lectures, in German, with Chika Unigwe, Paperback ISBN 978-3-89929-319-7)
- Be My Guest: Reflections on Food, Community and the Meaning of Generosity, non-fiction, 2019 (Hardback ISBN 978-1786898494)
- Im Wir und Jetzt, Feministin werden, non-fiction, 2021 (ISBN 978-3-518-47128-9)
- Locked In and Out, non-fiction, 2025, The University of Chicago Press (ISBN 978-3-035-80752-3)
