= Julia Bell (author) =

British novelist and poet

Julia Bell (born 1971) is a British novelist and poet living in North London. She is Senior Lecturer at Birkbeck and the founder and Project Director of the annual publication the Mechanics’ Institute Review and the website "Writers Hub" .

She has published two novels for young adults – Massive and Dirty Work – and the bestselling Creative Writing Coursebook, as well as poetry and short stories in various magazines and anthologies. She is an alumna of the University of East Anglia MA programme and a member of the Birmingham-based Tindal Street Fiction Group.

== Works ==
Massive

Her first novel, Massive, was published in the UK in 2002 (Macmillan) and the US in 2005 (Simon and Schuster). The novel is set in Birmingham and deals with a mother-daughter relationship in which the mother is suffering from anorexia. Imogen Russell Williams describes the book in The Guardian: "Julia Bell's 2002 novel Massive focuses on Carmen, the unlucky teenage daughter of rail-thin, glamorous, ambitious Maria, who oscillates between anorexia and bulimia like a nightmarish pinball, calling Carmen "Miss Piggy" and castigating her for hoarding sweet wrappers behind her headboard. Eventually, Maria inculcates Carmen with the seductive delusion that mastery of food equals mastery of fate, and the book culminates in a dreadful duel between mother and daughter, both desperate to prove themselves stronger, more powerful and more in control of their fabulous destiny by refusing to cave in and eat." According to WorldCat, the book is in over 430 libraries.

Dirty Work

Her second novel, Dirty Work, published in the UK (Macmillan) and US (Simon & Schuster) in 2007, deals with issues of human trafficking, especially for the sex trade. The book was well-received, with Stephanie Merritt describing it in The Observer as: "Julia Bell's gritty second novel […} follows two teenage girls through the brutality of Europe's sex trade. Hope, the wealthy English teenager mistakenly kidnapped by traffickers, makes explicit the comparison with slavery: 'No one buys people any more, they banned that, we did it in history. And anyway, it was only people from Africa, it wasn't, like, white people. William Wilberry or something.' Bell's dual narrative, divided between spoilt but resourceful Hope and fierce, broken Oksana from Russia, is pitch-perfect and the careful research is worn lightly." According to WorldCat, the book is in over 343 libraries.

The Creative Writing Coursebook

Published in 2001 (Macmillan), the book was created while Bell was teaching an undergraduate creative writing course at the University of East Anglia. It is devised as a series of lesson plans with contributions from 40 authors including David Lodge, Malcolm Bradbury, Ali Smith, Vicki Feaver.

Bell's teaching is also available online on the Writers Hub website. She gives an annual lecture to the MA students at Birkbeck. Her most recent on "Territory and the work of Damon Galgut."
