= Grace Jones (disambiguation) =

Grace Jones (born 1948) is an American model, singer and actress.

Grace Jones may also refer to:

- Grace Jones Morgan (1884—1977), Canadian author.
- Grace Adelaide Jones (1899—2013) and Grace Catherine Jones (1906—2019), British supercentenarians.
- Emily Grace Jones (2013—2020), a murder victim.
- Grace Jones, a novel by Irenosen Okojie.
