= Sareeta Domingo =

British author, editor and publisher (1980–2025)

- Born: Sareeta Ayodeley Domingo; 1980
- Died: 12 September 2025 (aged 44–45)
- Other names: Sunday James; S A Domingo
- Education: University of Warwick
- Occupations: Author; editor; publisher; blogger
- Years active: 2005–2025
- Website: www.sareetadomingo.com

Sareeta Ayodeley Domingo (1980 – 12 September 2025) was a British author, editor, publisher and blogger. She held senior positions at Mills & Boon, Trapeze Books and Jacaranda Books. Her adult novels included The Nearness of You (2016), If I Don't Have You (2020) and Possibility (2025). She edited the collection Who's Loving You: Love Stories by Women of Colour (2021). Domingo also wrote young adult fiction as S A Domingo. Her second young adult novel Love on the Main Stage (2020) was shortlisted for Lancashire Book of the Year.

== Early life and education ==
Domingo and her twin brother were born to parents Larry and Valda. She spent her early life in Camberwell, South London, and East Sussex before moving to Bahrain when she was nine years old for her father's work. At the age of 16, Domingo returned to England for boarding school at Cranbrook School, while the family settled in Tunbridge Wells. She graduated with a degree in Comparative American Literature from the University of Warwick in 2002.

== Career ==
Domingo began her career working in a local bookshop and then in the marketing department of Chrysalis Books (now Pavilion Books). She was commissioned to write shorts for Agent Provocateur as well as the novella The Confessional Diaries of a Girl in Town. Domingo then moved to Hothouse Fiction in 2008, where she worked as an editor and commissioner until 2016. During this time, she started a blog titled The Palate Cleanser on which she reviewed contemporary romance novels and wrote a 2014 novel under the pseudonym Sunday James titled Bittersweet.

Via Piatkus Books, Domingo published her debut romantic drama novel under her own name The Nearness of You in 2016. After freelancing for a year, Domingo joined Mills & Boon (part of Harlequin UK) in 2017 as Commissioning Editor.

Through a collaboration between Jacaranda Books and the London Library titled 20 in 20, Domingo published her second adult romance novel If I Don't Have You in 2020. If I Don't Have You was shortlisted for a Diverse Book Award in the Adult category and Refinery29 Black Girls Book Club pick. Domingo also wrote two young adult novels with Hachette Children's under the name S A Domingo: Love, Secret Santa (2019) and Love on the Main Stage (2020). Love on the Main Stage was shortlisted for Lancashire Book of the Year.

In 2019, Trapeze Books (an Orion Books and Hachette UK imprint) acquired the rights to publish the short story collection Who's Loving You: Love Stories by Women of Colour in 2021, created and edited by Domingo. Contemplating the romance genre, Domingo said: "[I]t was important to me that it didn't feel like [the authors] had to adhere to a particular idea of what a romance fiction story should be like, I just wanted them to write a love story." Contributors included Rowan Hisayo Buchanan, Irenosen Okojie, Sara Collins, Sara Jafari and Dorothy Koomson. Who's Loving You was longlisted for a Diverse Book Award.

At the start of 2022, Domingo joined Orion Publishing Group as editorial director of Trapeze Books. Domingo's novel The Nearness of You was re-published that year under the title The Three of Us. She also had a weekly book recommendation segment on the Worldwide FM morning programme The People's Breakfast: Morning Mari*.

In March 2025, Domingo was appointed publishing director of Jacaranda Books. Via a three-way auction in 2024, Renegade Books acquired the rights to publish Domingo's third and final romance novel Possibility in 2025.

In 2026, the Sareeta Domingo Prize was launched in her honour to support Black and Global Majority authors, founded by Dorothy Koomson, in partnership with Domingo's family, Hachette UK, Jacaranda Books and literary agency David Higham Associates (DHA).

== Personal life and death ==
Domingo lived in South London with her husband Will.

Domingo died "suddenly" on 12 September 2025. A number of tributes were paid. Valerie Brandes stated that Domingo's "contribution to literature and culture was extraordinary. Through her own writing and her editorial work, she was a keen supporter of underrepresented voices… in doing so, she helped reshape the literary landscape to be more inclusive, authentic and rich with diversity".

== Bibliography ==
=== Adult novels ===
- Bittersweet (2014) (as Sunday James)
- The Nearness of You (2016) (re-published as The Three of Us, 2022)
- If I Don't Have You (2020)
- Possibility (2025)

=== Young adult ===
- Love, Secret Santa (2019)
- Love on the Main Stage (2020)

=== Novellas and shorts ===
- Agent Provocateur:
  - "The Quiet One" (2006)
  - "Ritual" (2006)
  - "Perfect" (2009)
- The Confessional Diaries of a Girl in Town (2007)

=== Edited collections ===
- Who's Loving You: Love Stories by Women of Colour (2021)
