= Rest in Power =

Rest in Power may refer to:

- Rest in power, variation on rest in peace, to commemorate a person whose death is considered unjust or wrongful
- Rest in Power: The Enduring Life of Trayvon Martin, a 2017 book
- Rest in Power: The Trayvon Martin Story, a 2018 TV series
