= Betty Trask Prize and Awards =

Annual literary award

The Betty Trask Prize and Awards are for first novels written by authors under the age of 35 who reside in a current or former Commonwealth nation. Each year the awards total at least £20,000, with normally one author receiving a larger prize amount (£10,000 in very recent years), called the "Prize", and the remainder given to the other nominees, called the "Awards". These were established in 1984 by the Society of Authors at the bequest of the late Betty Trask, a reclusive author of over thirty romance novels. They're given to traditional or romantic novels, rather than those of an experimental style, and either published or unpublished works.

== List of award and prize winners ==
=== 1980s ===
Betty Trask Prize and Award winners, 1984–1989
Year	Author	Title	Prize
1984	Ronald Frame	Winter Journey	£6,750
1984	Clare Nonhebel	Cold Showers	£6,750
1984	James Buchan	A Parish of Rich Women	£1,000
1984	Helen Harris	Playing Fields in Winter	£1,000
1984	Gareth Jones	The Disinherited	£1,000
1984	Simon Rees	The Devil's Looking Glass	£1,000
1985	Susan Kay	Legacy	£12,500
1985	Gary Armitage	A Season of Peace	£1,000
1985	Elizabeth Ironside	A Very Private Enterprise	£1,000
1985	Alice Mitchell	Instead of Eden	£1,000
1985	George Schweiz	The Earth Abides For Ever	£1,000
1985	Caroline Stickland	The Standing Hills	£1,000
1986	Tim Parks	Tongues of Flame	£9,000
1986	Patricia Ferguson	Family, Myths and Legends	£4,500
1986	Philippa Blake	Mzungu's Wife	£1,000
1986	Matthew Kneale	Whore Banquets	£1,000
1986	J. F. McLaughlin	The Road to Dilmun	£1,000
1986	Kate Saunders	The Prodigal Father	£1,000
1987	James Maw	Hard Luck	£8,000
1987	Peter Benson	The Levels	£4,500
1987	Helen Flint	Return Journey	£4,500
1987	Catherine Arnold	Lost Time	£1,000
1987	H. S. Bhabra	Gestures	£1,000
1987	Lucy Pinney	The Pink Stallion	£1,000
1988	Alex Martin	The General Interruptor MS	£6,500
1988	Candia McWilliam	A Case of Knives	£6,500
1988	Georgina Andrewes	Behind the Waterfall	£2,000
1988	James Friel	Left of North	£2,000
1988	Glenn Patterson	Burning Your Own	£2,000
1988	Susan Webster	Small Tales of a Town	£2,000
1989	Nigel Watts	The Life Game	£10,000
1989	William Riviere	Watercolour Sky	£5,000
1989	Paul Houghton	Harry's Last Wedding	£2,000
1989	Alasdair McKee	Uncle Henry's Last Stand	£2,000

=== 1990s ===
Betty Trask Award winners, 1990–1999
Year	Author	Title	Prize
1990	Robert McLiam Wilson	Ripley Bogle	£16,000
1990	Elizabeth Chadwick	The Wild Hunt	£3,000
1990	Rosemary Cohen	No Strange Land	£3,000
1990	Nicholas Shakespeare	The Vision of Elena Silves	£3,000
1991	Amit Chaudhuri	A Strange and Sublime Address	£10,000
1991	Mark Swallow	Teaching Little Fang	£7,000
1991	Suzannah Dunn	Quite Contrary	£2,000
1991	Lesley Glaister	Honour Thy Father	£2,000
1991	Simon Mason	The Great English Nude	£2,000
1991	Nino Ricci	Lives of the Saints	£2,000
1992	Peter M. Rosenburg	Kissing Through a Pane of Glass	£5,000
1992	Tibor Fischer	Under the Frog	£3,000
1992	Liane Jones	The Dream Stone	£3,000
1992	Eugene Mullan	The Last of His Line	£3,000
1992	Edward St Aubyn	Never Mind	£3,000
1993	Mark Blackaby	You'll Never be Here Again	£10,000
1993	Andrew Cowan	Pig	£7,000
1993	Simon Corrigan	Tommy Was Here	£5,000
1993	Joanna Briscoe	Mothers and Other Lovers	£2,000
1993	Olivia Fane	Landing on Clouds	£2,000
1994	Colin Bateman	Divorcing Jack	£12,000
1994	Nadeem Aslam	Season of the Rainbirds	£10,000
1994	Guy Burt	After the Hole	£1,000
1994	Frances Liardet	The Game	£1,000
1994	Jonathan Rix	Some Hope	£1,000
1995	Robert Newman	Dependence Day	£10,000
1995	Mark Behr	The Smell of Apples	£8,000
1995	Martina Evans	Midnight Feast	£3,000
1995	Rohit Manchanda	A Speck of Coaldust	£1,000
1995	Juliet Thomas	Hallelujah Jordan	£1,000
1995	Philippa Walshe	The Latecomer	£1,000
1995	Madeleine Wickham	The Tennis Party	£1,000
1996	John Lanchester	The Debt to Pleasure	£8,000
1996	Meera Syal	Anita and Me	£7,000
1996	Rhidian Brook	The Testimony of Taliesin Jones	£5,000
1996	Louis Caron Buss	The Luxury of Exile	£5,000
1997	Alex Garland	The Beach	£12,000
1997	Josie Barnard	Poker Face	£5,000
1997	Ardashir Vakil	Beach Boy	£5,000
1997	Diran Adebayo	Some Kind of Black	£1,500
1997	Sanjida O'Connell	Theory of Mind	£1,500
1998	Kiran Desai	Hullabaloo in the Guava Orchard	£10,000
1998	Nick Earls	Zig Zag Street	£8,000
1998	Phil Whitaker	Eclipse of the Sun	£5,000
1998	Tobias Hill	Underground	£1,000
1998	Gail Anderson-Dargatz	The Cure for Death by Lightning	£1,000
1999	Elliot Perlman	Three Dollars	£7,000
1999	Catherine Chidgey	In a Fishbone Church	£6,000
1999	Giles Foden	The Last King of Scotland	£4,000
1999	Dennis Bock	Olympia	£3,000
1999	Rajeev Balasubramanyam	In Beautiful Disguises	£2,500
1999	Sarah Waters	Tipping the Velvet	£1,000

=== 2000s ===
Since 2009, the Betty Trask Prize has been given to a single author; the remaining receive the Betty Trask Award. A blue ribbon indicates the winner for that year.

Betty Trask Award winners, 2000–2009
Year	Author	Title	Prize	Ref.
2000	Jonathan Tulloch	The Season Ticket	£10,000	
2000	Julia Leigh	The Hunter	£7,000	
2000	Susan Elderkin	Sunset Over Chocolate Mountains	£4,000	
2000	Galaxy Craze	By the Shore	£2,000	
2000	Nicholas Griffin	The Requiem Shark	£2,000	
2001	Zadie Smith	White Teeth	£8,000	
2001	Justin Hill	The Drink and Dream Teahouse	£5,000	
2001	Maggie O'Farrell	After You'd Gone	£5,000	
2001	Vivien Kelly	Take One Young Man	£4,000	
2001	Mohsin Hamid	Moth Smoke	£2,500	
2001	Patrick Neate	Musungu Jim and the Great Chief Tuloko	£2,500	
2002	Hari Kunzru	The Impressionist	£8,000	
2002	Rachel Seiffert	The Dark Room	£5,000	
2002	Shamim Sarif	The World Unseen	£4,000	
2002	Helen Cross	My Summer of Love	£2,000	
2002	Chloe Hooper	A Child's Book of True Crime	£2,000	
2002	Susanna Jones	The Earthquake Bird	£2,000	
2002	Gwendoline Riley	Cold Water	£2,000	
2003	Jon McGregor	If Nobody Speaks of Remarkable Things	£10,000	
2003	Sarah Hall	Haweswater	£6,000	
2003	Stephanie Merritt	Gaveston	£4,000	
2003	Elizabeth Garner	Nightdancing	£2,000	
2003	Zoë Strachan	Negative Space	£2,000	
2003	Adam Thirlwell	Politics	£1,000	
2004	Louise Dean	Becoming Strangers	£8,000	
2004	Hannah MacDonald	The Sun Road	£6,000	
2004	Anthony Cartwright	The Afterglow	£3,000	
2004	Siddharth Dhanvant Sanghvi	The Last Song of Dusk	£3,000	
2005	Susan Fletcher	Eve Green	£16,000	
2005	Diana Evans	26a	£2,000	
2005	Helen Walsh	Brass	£2,000	
2006	Nick Laird	Utterly Monkey	£10,000	
2006	Peter Hobbs	The Short Day Dying	£5,000	
2006	Nicola Monaghan	The Killing Jar	£5,000	
2007	Will Davis	My Side of the Story	£10,000	
2007	Adam Foulds	The Truth About These Strange Times	£2,500	
2007	Cynan Jones	The Long Dry	£2,500	
2007	Julie Maxwell	You Can Live Forever	£2,500	
2007	Karen McLeod	In Search of the Missing Eyelash	£2,500	
2008	David Szalay	London and the South-East	£10,000	
2008	Ross Raisin	God's Own Country	£6,000	
2008	Thomas Leveritt	The Exchange Rate Between Love and Money	£2,000	
2008	Anna Ralph	The Floating Island	£2,000	
2009	Samantha Harvey	The Wilderness	£12,000	
2009	Eleanor Catton	The Rehearsal	£8,000	

=== 2010s ===
Betty Trask Award winners, 2010–2019
Year	Author	Title	Prize	Ref.
2010	Nadifa Mohamed	Black Mamba Boy	£10,000	
2010	Evie Wyld	After the Fire, A Still Small Voice	£7,000	
2010	Jenn Ashworth	A Kind of Intimacy	£1,500	
2010	Adaobi Tricia Nwaubani	I Do Not Come to You By Chance	£1,500	
2011	Anjali Joseph	Saraswati Park	£10,000	
2011	Laura Barton	Twenty-One Locks	£6,000	
2011	Simon Lelic	Rupture	£2,500	
2011	Robert Williams	Luke and Jon	£2,500	
2012	David Whitehouse	Bed	£8,000	
2012	Kalinda Ashton	The Danger Game	£3,000	
2012	Elizabeth Day	Scissors, Paper, Stone	£3,000	
2012	Annabel Pitcher	My Sister Lives on the Mantelpiece	£3,000	
2012	Emma Jane Unsworth	Hungry the Stars and Everything	£3,000	
2013	Grace McCleen	The Land of Decoration	£8,000	
2013	Chibundu Onuzo	The Spider King's Daughter	£7,000	
2013	Francesca Segal	The Innocents	£2,500	
2013	Will Wiles	Care of Wooden Floors	£2,500	
2014	Nathan Filer	The Shock of the Fall	£10,000	
2014	NoViolet Bulawayo	We Need New Names	£3,750	
2014	Sam Byers	Idiopathy	£3,750	
2014	Mave Fellowes	Chaplin and Company	£3,750	
2014	Matt Greene	Ostrich	£3,750	
2015	Ben Fergusson	The Spring of Kasper Meier	£10,000	
2015	Emma Healey	Elizabeth Is Missing	£5,000	
2015	Zoe Pilger	Eat My Heart Out	£5,000	
2015	Simon Wroe	Chop Chop	£5,000	
2016	Alex Christofi	Glass	£10,000	
2016	Irenosen Okojie	Butterfly Fish	£5,000	
2016	Natasha Pulley	The Watchmaker of Filigree Street	£5,000	
2016	Lucy Wood	Wood for Weathering	£5,000	
2017	Daniel Shand	Fallow	£10,000	
2017	Rowan Hisayo Buchanan	Harmless Like You	£3,000	
2017	Elnathan John	Born on a Tuesday	£3,000	
2017	Kathleen Jowitt	Speak Its Name	£3,000	
2017	Rob McCarthy	The Hollow Men	£3,000	
2017	Barney Norris	Five Rivers Met on a Wooded Plain	£3,000	
2018	Omar Robert Hamilton	The City Always Wins	£10,000	
2018	Sarah Day	Mussolini's Island	£3,250	
2018	Clare Fisher	All the Good Things	£3,250	
2018	Eli Goldstone	Strange Heart Beating	£3,250	
2018	Lloyd Markham	Bad Ideas/Chemicals	£3,250	
2018	Masande Ntshanga	The Reactive	£3,250	
2019	James Clarke	The Litten Path	£10,000	
2019	Samuel Fisher	The Chameleon	£2,700	
2019	Imogen Hermes Gowar	The Mermaid and Mrs Hancock	£2,700	
2019	Ruqaya Izzidien	The Watermelon Boys	£2,700	
2019	Daisy Lafarge	Paul	£2,700	
2019	Rebecca Ley	Sweet Fruit, Sour Land	£2,700	
2019	Sophie Mackintosh	The Water Cure	£2,700	

=== 2020s ===
Betty Trask Award winners, 2020–present
Year	Author	Title	Prize	Ref.
2020	Kathryn Hind	Hitch	£10,000	
2020	Stacey Halls	The Familiars	£5,400	
2020	Isabella Hammad	The Parisian	£5,400	
2020	Okeychukwu Nzelu	The Private Joys of Nnenna Maloney	£5,400	
2021	McMullan	The Last Good Man		
2021	Graeme Armstrong	The Young Team		
2021	Maame Blue	Bad Love		
2021	Kiran Millwood Hargrave	The Mercies		
2021	Eley Williams	The Liar’s Dictionary		
2021	Nneoma Ike-Njoku	The Water House		
2022	Will McPhail	IN: The Graphic Novel		
2022	A. K. Blakemore	The Manningtree Witches		
2022	Natasha Brown	Assembly		
2022	Caleb Azumah Nelson	Open Water		
2022	Megan Nolan	Acts of Desperation		
2023	Daniel Wiles	Mercia's Take	£10,000	
2023	Paddy Crewe	My Name Is Yip		
2023	Imogen Crimp	A Very Nice Girl		
2023	Maddie Mortimer	Maps of Our Spectacular Bodies		
2024	Tom Crewe	The New Life	£10,000	
2024	Stephen Buoro	The Five Sorrowful Mysteries of Andy Africa		
2024	Rachel Connolly	Lazy City		
2024	Rachel Dawson	Neon Roses		
2024	C. E. McGill	Our Hideous Progeny		
2024	Nathan Munday	Whaling		
2025	Bonnie Burke-Patel	I Died at Fallow Hall		
2025	Madeline Docherty	Gender Theory		
2025	Genevieve Jagger	Fragile Animals		
2025	Ashani Lewis	Winter Animals	£10,000	
2025	Elizabeth O'Connor	Whale Fall		
2025	Nicolas Padamsee	England Is Mine		
