= Sara Jafari =

English writer

- Born: 1993 (age 32–33); Kingston upon Hull, England
- Education: Goldsmiths, University of London
- Occupations: Writer, editor
- Years active: 2017–present
- Spouse: Matthew Thompson (m. 2024)
- Website: www.sarajafari.com

Sara Jafari (born 1993) is an English writer and editor. She is known for her contemporary novels The Mismatch (2021) and People Change (also known as Things Left Unsaid, 2023). Jafari appeared on the 2023 Country & Town House list of emerging British authors.

== Early life ==
Jafari was born in Kingston upon Hull to Iranian parents and moved to Brighton at age 16. She attended Wolfreton School and then completed her A Levels at Varndean College. She graduated from Goldsmiths, University of London with a Bachelor of Arts (BA) in English and Comparative Literature.

== Career ==
Jafari founded and became editor-in-chief of the literary and arts print magazine Token (also stylised uppercase as TOKEN) in 2017. That same year, she began working as an editorial assistant at Mills & Boon. She then became a children's editor at Penguin Random House and later Bloomsbury Publishing. Jafari received a 2018 London Writers Award in the literary fiction category.

In 2020, Jafari signed a two-book deal with Arrow Books (a Penguin Random House imprint), through which she published her debut novel The Mismatch. The contemporary novel follows the sheltered 21-year-old Soraya as she explores romance and sexuality with rugby player Magnus amid the backdrop of her mother's journey from Iran to England. Jafari also contributed to Sareeta Domingo's romance anthology Who's Loving You.

Via the Penguin imprint Cornerstone, Jafari's second adult contemporary novel People Change was published in 2023. featuring a romance between two estranged British Iranian school friends Shirin and Kian who reunite in their 20s. Jafari had first come up with the concept when she was a teenager, inspired by David Nicholls' One Day (2009). People Change had a second release in other territories in May 2025 under the title Things Left Unsaid via St Martin's Press. In addition, Jafari and Ruth Knowles edited Jenny Ireland's young adult novel The First Move, which was shortlisted for the 2024 Branford Boase Award.

In August 2024, Delacorte Press (another Penguin Random House imprint) acquired the rights to publish Jafari's next work and her first young adult romantic fantasy novel Heavensent and Hellbent in 2026.

== Personal life ==
Jafari married Matthew Thompson in 2024.

== Bibliography ==
=== Novels ===
- The Mismatch. London: Arrow. 2021. ISBN 9781787465015. OCLC 1194958887.
- People Change. London: Penguin. 2023. ISBN 9781529157550. (published as Things Left Unsaid in some territories)
- Heavensent and Hellbent (2026)

=== Short stories and essays ===
- "Body Hair & Me". Tales Magazine: Empowered. No. 5. 2017. pp. 50–53.
- Buchanan, Rowan Hisayo, ed. (2018). "The Exotic (novel excerpt)". The Good Journal. Vol. 2.
- Domingo, Sareeta, ed. (2021). "Motherland". Who's Loving You: Love Stories by Women of Colour. London: Trapeze. ISBN 9781409193722. OCLC 1089485075.
