= MiG-29: Soviet Fighter =

Shoot 'em up video game

- Cover art
- Developers: Richard Chaney; Peter Williamson (ports); Paul Black C64 conversion
- Publisher: Codemasters
- Composer: Allister Brimble (Amiga)
- Platforms: Amstrad CPC, Commodore 64, Amiga, Atari ST, NES, ZX Spectrum
- Release: 1989
- Genres: Action, shoot 'em up
- Mode: Single player

Reception

Review score
Publication	Score
GameZone	NES: 65/100

MiG-29: Soviet Fighter is a shoot 'em up game developed by Codemasters in 1989 and released for several contemporary home computers. An unlicensed version was also released for the Nintendo Entertainment System by Camerica.

== Gameplay ==
The player plays the role of a Soviet MiG-29 fighter pilot. The object of the game is to defeat the World Terrorist Army. It is similar in style to After Burner. MiG-29 cartridges have a small switch in the back to enable or disable hardware to bypass the console's 10NES lockout chip.

== Development ==
The original version of the game was written for the ZX Spectrum by Richard Chaney while he was a pupil at Wolfreton School, Hull, UK. Updated graphics and sound were later added by Codemasters. The ten names on the high score table are pupils in Richard's form at the school, giving away the game's home-grown origins.
