= Butterfly Fish (novel) =

2015 novel by Irenosen Okojie

- First edition
- Author: Irenosen Okojie
- Language: English
- Genre: Magic realism
- Publisher: Jacaranda Books
- Publication date: 2015
- Publication place: Nigeria
- Pages: 304 (first edition)
- Awards: Betty Trask Prize (2016)
- ISBN: 9781909762060
- Followed by: Speaking Gigantular

Butterfly Fish is the 2015 debut novel of Nigerian writer Irenosen Okojie. It was published by Jacaranda Books, winning the Betty Trask Prize in 2016.

== Plot summary ==
The novel focuses on Joy, a Nigerian London-based photographer who lives with her mother. As the novel progresses, Joy's mother dies leaving her with the family inheritance which includes her grandfather's journal and a bronze from Benin Kingdom, she is tasked grieving for her dead mother and finding her family secrets.
