= Christofi =

Christofi is a Greek surname, commonly found in Cyprus. Notable people with the surname include:

- Alex Christofi, British Cypriot novelist
- Alkiviadis Christofi (born 1992), Cypriot footballer
- Demetris Christofi (born 1988), Cypriot footballer
- Demetris Christofi (born 1994), Cypriot footballer
- Eleni Christofi (born 1998), Greek tennis player
- Styllou Christofi (1900–1954), Greek Cypriot convicted of murder
