= Beach Boy =

1997 novel by Ardashir Vakil

- Author: Ardashir Vakil
- Publisher: Penguin Books
- Publication date: January 1, 1997
- ISBN: 978-0-140-26489-0

Beach Boy (1997) is the debut novel of Indian novelist Ardashir Vakil. It is a coming-of-age story (bildungsroman) set in 1970s Bombay. The novel won the Betty Trask Award and was nominated for the Whitbread Prize. It was first published by Penguin Books.
