= My Summer of Love (novel) =

2001 novel by Helen Cross

- Author: Helen Cross
- Language: English
- Genre: Novel
- Publisher: Bloomsbury Publishing
- Publication date: 2001
- Publication place: United Kingdom
- Media type: Print (Paperback)
- Pages: 256 pp (first edition, paperback)
- ISBN: 0-7475-5276-2 (first edition, paperback)
- OCLC: 47985253

My Summer Of Love is a novel by Helen Cross, first published in Great Britain in 2001, winning a Betty Trask Award in the subsequent year.

Set in the fictional Yorkshire market town of Whitehorse, and the surrounding area, it tells the story of the intense relationship that develops between Tamsin and Mona, two 15-year-old girls of different social classes. Mona narrates as a recollection for the entire novel, though it is not clear how much time has passed since the events she is describing. In the first chapter, she brings the narrative back to the present with cryptic references to the end of the tale, but after this the narrative is uninterrupted and stays in the past tense.

In 2004, a film based on the novel was released, but it was a fairly free adaptation, and differs from the novel in a number of ways.

== Plot summary ==
At the beginning of the novel, Mona's sister, Lindy, is getting married for the second time. The date is given as 23 May 1984.

Mona is self-conscious of her appearance; she is a bridesmaid. She plays on the fruit machines in the pub in which her family lives, and drinks alcohol to help her cope with the day.

After the festivities of the day, she goes to a large house in a nearby village. She occasionally tends to the residents' pony, Willow, though the Fakenhams don't pay her much attention, or any money. This evening, however, Mr. Fakenham speaks to her and asks her, in rather an awkward manner, to befriend his youngest daughter, Tamsin - she has been sent home from boarding school and seems to be lonely.

Mona herself is feeling quite friendless - she refers to 'poor lost Anne-Marie' as someone who had once been a school-friend. However, they have drifted apart - Mona had lost her mother to cancer a year previously, and she reflects that Anne-Marie was probably emotionally drained by having to support her through her bereavement. However, she thinks it's a very pitiful state of affairs that Tamsin's father is begging people to be her friend.

Despite this, in the days after the wedding, Mona feels lonely and bored. She is off school - it appears to be exam leave - and she decides to visit the Fakenham's house. She finds Mr. and Mrs. Fakenham in a blazing row.

The girls are then left to their own devices. Mona finds herself instantly drawn to - and fascinated by - Tamsin.

== Reviews ==
A Kirkus Review said "Scabrous and cleverly evocative of the confusion of emergent adulthood, Cross’s blistering prose lifts a familiar storyline to another level." Danika Ellis said "In conclusion, while this book is Sapphic, unless you are in the mood for a dark read – don’t read it."

== Awards ==
- Betty Trask Award
