= Simon Corrigan =

British author (born 1964)

Simon Corrigan is the British author of Tommy Was Here, which won the Betty Trask Award in 1993, and Sweets With Strangers.

== Life and career ==
Born in Barnsley in 1964, Corrigan studied at Chetham's School of Music and went on to read English at King's College, Cambridge.

After leaving Cambridge, he studied music at the Paris Conservatoire, and wrote his first novel, the semi-autobiographical Tommy Was Here, published by Andre Deutsch, which won the Betty Trask Award in 1993.

Described as "promising", Tommy Was Here received extensive coverage in the literary press. Publishers Weekly said: "Corrigan's elegant prose is flecked with irony, wit and astute social observation," although Kirkus Reviews described the novel as "melodramatic," saying: "Corrigan has yet to find his sea legs as a novelist, but he does have one great asset: the ability to keep a story moving."

Corrigan's second novel, Sweets From Strangers, was published in 1994 with considerably less press coverage, although it was described by Kirkus as: "an eerie and strangely satisfying read."

Corrigan lived in London, Paris, Lisbon and Trieste before settling in Budapest, where he wrote about the challenges of learning the language, and his growing appreciation for Hungarian literature in translation. In 2004, he said in an article that he was researching and working on two more books, "dealing respectively with vampirism and Empress Elisabeth of Austria."

In 2013 Corrigan was named as editor to a memoir in two volumes about the decline of Communism in Hungary by fellow-immigrant and musician Marion Merrick, Now You See it, Now You Don't, which was followed by House of Cards. Simon Corrigan died in 2006, in Budapest.

== Books ==
- Tommy Was Here. Deutsch. 1992. ISBN 978-0233987842.
- Sweets From Strangers. Deutsch. 1994. ISBN 978-0233988948.
