= Anthony Cartwright (writer) =

British novelist

- Born: 1973 (age 52–53); Dudley, Staffordshire, England
- Education: University of East Anglia
- Occupation: Novelist
- Writing career
- Language: English
- Notable awards: Betty Trask Award (2004)

Anthony J. Cartwright (born 1973) is a British novelist.

He was educated at the University of East Anglia (BA Creative Writing, 1996). He received the Betty Trask Award for his novel The Afterglow in 2004. The Afterglow was also shortlisted for the James Tait Black Memorial Prize, the John Llewellyn Rhys Prize, and the Commonwealth Writers' Prize. His second novel, Heartland, was shortlisted for The People's Book Prize and the Commonwealth Writers' Prize.

In 2015 he collaborates with the Italian writer Gian Luca Favetto and 66thand2nd editions for "Il giorno perduto - Racconto di un viaggio all'Heysel". Cartwright was responsible for the English part, and Favetto for the Italian part. A boy from Liverpool and a family from Turin, leave their homes to go to see Liverpool-Juventus in Brussels, in what we recall as one of the greatest disasters in the history of soccer.

== Awards ==
- 2004 Betty Trask Award, The Afterglow

== Bibliography ==
- The Afterglow (2004)
- Heartland (2009)
- How I Killed Margaret Thatcher (2012)
- Iron Towns (2016)
- The Cut (2017)
