= Thomas Leveritt =

English painter

Thomas Leveritt is an Anglo-American artist who works in various media. His roots are in figurative painting, for which he has won the Carroll Medal for Portraiture from the UK's Royal Society of Portrait Painters, and other painting awards from the National Portrait Gallery. He has also won the Betty Trask Award for a first novel from the Society of Authors, as well as the Somerset Maugham Award, for his novel The Exchange-Rate Between Love and Money.

Raised in Dallas, Texas, Leveritt was sent to boarding school in England at the age of 8. At 13 he won a full scholarship to Harrow School. He went on to study history at Peterhouse, Cambridge, graduating with a double first.
