= Simon Lelic =

British author

- Born: Simon Lelic; 1976 (age 49–50); Brighton, England
- Education: University of Exeter
- Occupation: Novelist
- Children: 3
- Writing career
- Language: English
- Period: 2010 – present
- Genres: Crime fiction, thrillers
- Website: www.simonlelic.com

Simon Lelic (/ˈlɛlɪtʃ/ LELL-itch) is a British novelist of mysteries and thrillers.

== Life and career ==
Lelic was born in 1976 in Brighton. He studied history at the University of Exeter and then took a post-graduate course in Journalism. He worked as a freelancer and in business-to-business publishing before becoming a novelist, and has also owned an import/export company.

His first novel, Rupture (2010) won a Betty Trask Award in 2011. He has also written the Haven series of young adult thrillers; the first book, The Haven, was published in 2019.

== Published works ==
- Rupture (US: A Thousand Cuts) (Picador/Viking, 2010)
- The Facility (Mantle, 2011)
- The Child Who (Mantle, 2012)
- The House (US: The New Neighbors) (Berkley, 2017)
- The Liar's Room (Berkley, 2019)
- The Search Party (Berkley, 2020)
- The Hiding Place (Penguin, 2022)

=== Haven ===
- The Haven (2019)
- Revolution (2019)
- Deadfall (2020)
