= Nathan Filer =

British writer (born 1980)

- Born: 1980 (age 45–46)
- Education: University of the West of England
- Occupations: Writer, Broadcaster
- Writing career
- Notable work: The Shock of the Fall
- Notable awards: Costa Book of the Year; Betty Trask Prize

Nathan Filer is a British writer and broadcaster best known for his novel, The Shock of the Fall. This won several major literary awards, including the Costa Book of the Year and the Betty Trask Prize. It was a Sunday Times Bestseller, and has been translated into thirty languages.

== Life and career ==
Filer was born in Bristol in 1980. He attended the Ridings High School, a large secondary school located in the village of Winterbourne in South Gloucestershire. In 2002 he trained as a psychiatric nurse gaining a first class degree in Mental Health Nursing from the University of the West of England and later worked in mental health research at the University of Bristol.

His novel The Shock of the Fall describes the life of a boy from Bristol dealing with his grief at the death of his brother, and experience of mental health care services for schizophrenia. Reviewing the book in The Psychologist, Caroline Flurey writes, "This is a beautifully poignant book, written with sympathy and sensitivity, well deserving of its Costa Book of the Year award." Filer's subsequent book of non-fiction, The Heartland: Finding and Losing Schizophrenia, was published by Faber and Faber in 2019. It was a Sunday Times Book of the Year and the charity, Rethink Mental Illness, named it as one of their Mental Health Books of the Decade. It was also longlisted for the Rathbones Folio Prize.

Filer writes on a range of issues for The Guardian. A story he wrote for The New York Times that described working with the International Solidarity Movement in Palestine was adapted for an episode of the Israeli prime time radio show, Israel Story, featuring Filer and his partner.

His work as a broadcaster includes the 2017 Archive on 4 documentary, The Mind in the Media, in which he explored representations of mental illness and their impact. This was shortlisted for a Mind Media Award in the best radio programme category. In 2021, Filer presented a five-part podcast series called Why Do I Feel? This was a Financial Times Top 10 podcast of the year. It was praised by the paper for 'counterbalancing bleak stories with moments of levity, successfully steering clear of the clichés of most mental health podcasts'. It also won a silver award at the 2022 Radio Academy ARIAS in the 'Best Independent Podcast' category. In 2026, he wrote and presented All Kinds of Minds, a three-part BBC Radio 4 documentary series exploring neurodivergence.

Filer is the recipient of the honorary degree of Master of Letters from the University of the West of England and the honorary degree of Doctor of Liberal Arts from Abertay University. These degrees were conferred in recognition of his role in raising awareness through literature and his commitment to mental health care.

He holds a master's degree and PhD from Bath Spa University, where he is a Reader in Creative Writing.

== Books ==
- The Shock of the Fall (HarperFiction, 2013; The Borough Press, 2014)
- The Heartland (also published as This Book will Change Your Mind about Mental Health) (Faber, 2019)

== Audio ==
- The Mind in the Media (BBC, 2017)
- Why Do I Feel? (Bite Your Tongue Productions, 2021)
- All Kinds of Minds (BBC, 2026)

== Awards and honours ==
- 2013 Costa Book Awards First Novel Award for The Shock of the Fall
- 2013 Costa Book Awards Book of the Year for The Shock of the Fall
- 2014 Betty Trask Prize winner for The Shock of the Fall
- 2014 Specsavers National Book Awards Popular Fiction Book of the Year for The Shock of the Fall
- 2014 Writers' Guild of Great Britain (WGGB Awards) Best First Novel for The Shock of the Fall
- 2015 Honorary Degree of Master of Letters from the University of the West of England
- 2015 Honorary Doctorate of Liberal Arts from Abertay University
- 2017 Mind Media Awards Radio Category shortlisted for The Mind in the Media
- 2020 Rathbones Folio Prize longlist for The Heartland
- 2022 Radio Academy ARIAS Silver Award for Why Do I Feel?
