= Gender Theory (novel) =

2024 novel by Madeline Docherty

- Author: Madeline Docherty
- Language: English
- Genre: Novel, Literary realism
- Set in: Scotland (Glasgow, Aberdeen, Edinburgh as well as the country side)
- Publisher: John Murray
- Publication date: 6 June 2024
- Publication place: United Kingdom
- Pages: 208 pp
- ISBN: 9781399812214

Gender Theory is the debut novel by Scottish author Madeline Docherty. It was published by John Murray in 2024. The narrative follows a young woman's health and relationships told largely through vignettes. The book deals with themes such as alienation, identity, sexuality. It is notably written in the second person singular.

== Development ==
Docherty wrote the first draft of Gender Theory in the course of a creative writing workshop. The second person perspective was inspired by Carmen Maria Machado's 2019 memoir In the Dream House. Docherty has stated in an interview that the perspective allowed for a needed "physicality and immediacy" in the writing. Docherty has talked about her personal history with endometriosis and basing the character's health on herself.

In 2023 John Murray bought the rights to Gender Theory by preempting.

== Critical reception ==
Nb magazine called Gender Theory "razor-sharp, smart and utterly consuming", especially highlighting the educational role the book could fulfill for people learning about endometriosis. Michaela Minder, writing a review of the German translation for the literary student magazine Rezensöhnchen, compliments Docherty's writing style as well as the second-person perspective for achieving a specific closeness between reader and protagonist, but criticizes what she has picked up on as a "certain value judgement in the comparison of two [of the book's] long-term partners."

In May 2025 the novel was shortlisted for the Betty Trask Prize, an award for debut novels by authors under 35 hosted by the Society of Authors.

== Reviews ==
- Kelly, Stuart (12 June 2024). "Book review: Gender Theory, by Madeline Docherty". The Scotsman.
- Townes, Gabriela. "Gender Theory, Madeline Docherty". nb magazine.
- Minder, Michaela (4 April 2025). "Madeline Docherty - Erdbeeren und Zigarettenqualm". Rezensöhnchen (in German).
