= Rest in power =

Idiomatic expression; variant of "rest in peace"

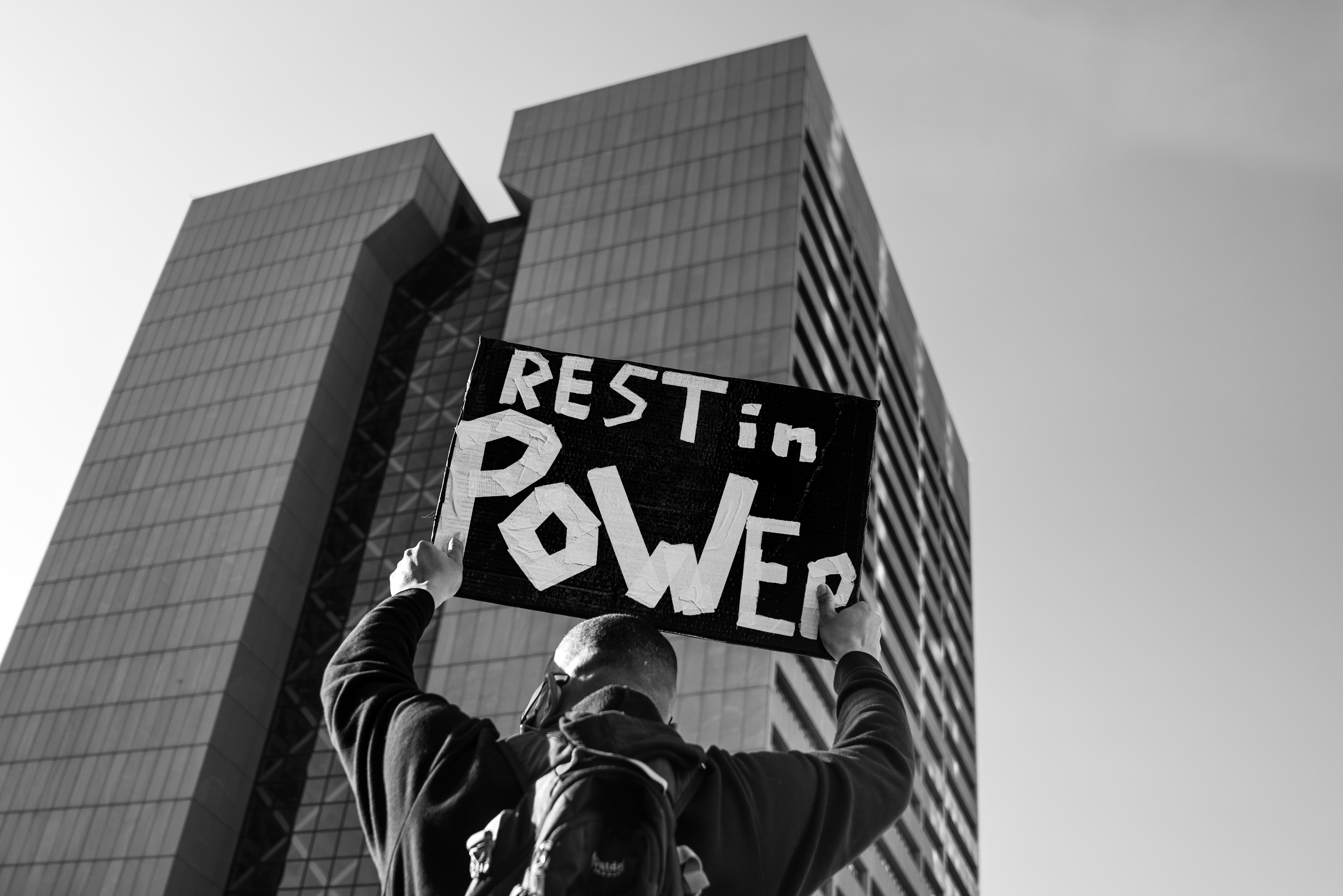
A protester holding a sign reading "rest in power" outside of the Hennepin County Government Center during the 2021 trial of Derek Chauvin

Rest in power (a variation on rest in peace) is an expression used to mourn, remember or celebrate a deceased person, especially someone who is thought to have struggled against systemic prejudice such as homophobia, transphobia, racism or suffered because of it in the United States. It has been used to eulogize victims of hate crimes while protesting the social inequality and institutionalised discrimination that may have led to their deaths. It is a common phrase to use to honor someone's legacy, though as an activist.

As a leftist alternative in opposition to the traditional Christian phrase "rest in peace", "rest in power" suggests that even in death the deceased person has the power to make a difference to others. The phrase is a statement of solidarity and a call to continue the struggle for social justice, as the deceased person will not be able to 'rest in peace' until society itself is in peace. However, it also implies the hope that the deceased person can now rest, free from oppression. "Rest in power" can also be used for murder victims, especially if the case is left unresolved.

== History ==
An early example of the phrase "rest in power" was published in an LA Weekly article about Latino gangs in East L.A., "Going up L.A." by Rubén Martínez, on 13 April 1989.

Etymologist Barry Popik traced one of the earliest recorded uses of the phrase to a newsgroup post on February 18, 2000, which paid tribute to Oakland, California graffiti artist Mike 'Dream' Francisco, who had been shot and killed during an armed robbery. Dream's graffiti art was political in tone, and his pieces often critiqued the United States government's treatment of poor and marginalized people. The post to alt.graffiti, by a contributor identified only as "SPANK", ended with the words "REST IN POWER PLAYA".

By the mid-2000s, the phrase began to appear in print, again linked to young people's premature, violent deaths. In March 2003, under the headline "Rest In Power, Rachel Corrie", In These Times eulogised the death of activist Rachel Corrie at the hands of the Israeli military in Gaza. In a 2005 opinion piece in the San Francisco Chronicle, Meredith Maran reflected on 19-year-old Meleia Willis-Starbuck, a Dartmouth College scholarship student who was home in Berkeley for the summer when she was shot and killed by an unknown assailant outside her apartment. Writing of the makeshift public altar set up to mourn Willis-Starbuck, Maran wrote, "I've never seen 'Rest in Power' written as a substitute for 'Rest in Peace.'"

A September 29, 2005, article in the Ottawa Citizen, a Canadian newspaper, described a public graffiti memorial for teenage Ottawa murder victim Jennifer Teague that portrayed "a smiling Ms. Teague beneath the words, 'Rest in power'" and framed by "two black angels."

== Protesting transphobia ==
"Rest in power" has since become widely used when mourning the deaths of trans people, and is a rallying cry on the Transgender Day of Remembrance, observed each year on November 20.

== Black Lives Matter ==
The parents of Trayvon Martin, the 17-year-old African-American who was fatally shot by George Zimmerman in 2012, wrote a 2017 nonfiction book titled Rest in Power about their son's life and legacy. In 2018 the book was adapted into a six-part television documentary series titled Rest in Power: The Trayvon Martin Story.

But it was the deaths of two more African-Americans in the summer of 2014 – Michael Brown, who was shot by police in Ferguson, Missouri, and Eric Garner, who was choked to death by police in New York City – that galvanised the broader visibility of "Rest in power", along with other phrases that had previously circulated in vernacular usage in minority communities and among activists, such as "Black lives matter" and "stay woke".

In the song 'Rest in Power', the official theme for the 2018 documentary series of the same name, Black Thought raps: "To them it's real, sins of the father remembered still / For every Trayvon Martin, there was an Emmett Till".

== Wider usage ==
"Rest in power" is sometimes used outside the context of activist social media to mark the deaths of respected public figures who leave strong legacies, even if they are not known for their political activism. Some internet users used the phrase to commemorate the assassination of Jo Cox, a British MP killed by a far-right gunman. After the death of Queen Elizabeth II in 2022, some commentators used the phrase.
