= Grace Jones (short story) =

Short story by Irenosen Okojie

- Short story by Irenosen Okojie
- Country: Nigeria
- Language: English
- Genres: Short story, fiction

Publication
- Published in: Nudibranch
- Publisher: Dialogue Books
- Publication date: 2019
- Awards: Caine Prize for African Writing

"Grace Jones" is young adult short story that won the 2020 Caine Prize for African Writing, written by Nigerian short story writer Irenosen Okojie. It is included in her collection Nudibranch, which was published by Little, Brown and Company via its Dialogue Books imprints in 2019. The short story received critical reviews.

== Plot summary ==
The short story centres on a young lady who impersonates Grace Jones after watching her on television. She does this in order to secure a job.

== Reception ==
"Grace Jones" won the Caine Prize for African Writing in 2020. The Irish Times described it as "...a radical story that plays with logic, time and place; it defies convention, as it unfolds a narrative that is multi-layered and multi-dimensional."
