= Ruqaya Izzidien =

Iraqi–Welsh novelist and freelance journalist

Ruqaya Izzidien is an Iraqi–Welsh novelist and freelance journalist. She lives in England.

== Life and career ==
Born to an Iraqi father and an English mother, Izzidien grew up in Llanybydder, Wales. She studied Modern Languages at Durham University in 2005. As a journalist, her work has appeared in The New York Times, The Guardian, Al Jazeera English and the BBC. She has lived in Gaza, Egypt, and Morocco, before moving to the North West of England, where she currently resides.

In 2019, she was among six of the authors awarded the Betty Trask Awards for her debut novel The Watermelon Boys, 2018 published by Hoopoe Fiction (AUC Press).

== Work ==
Novels

- The Watermelon Boys (Hoopoe, London 2018. ISBN 978-9774168802.)

== See also ==
- List of Iraqi artists
- List of Iraqi women artists
