= The Shock of the Fall =

2013 novel by Nathan Filer

- First edition
- Author: Nathan Filer
- Language: English
- Genre: Psychological fiction
- Published: 9 May 2013 (UK)
- Publisher: HarperCollins (UK); St. Martin's Press (US)
- Publication place: United Kingdom
- Media type: Print (Hardcover, paperback)
- Pages: 320 pp
- ISBN: 9780007491452

The Shock of the Fall is British author Nathan Filer's debut novel, published in 2013 through HarperCollins. The book tells the story of Matthew Homes, a 19-year-old boy from Bristol, dealing with the death of his older brother. It explores the central themes of loss, guilt, and mental illness. It takes place over three timelines: the present in which Matt is writing; the past when Simon was alive; and the decade after Simon died.

The novel was first published in the UK on 9 May 2013, by HarperCollins. It was originally published in the United States by St. Martin's Press under the title Where the Moon Isn't.

It is a Sunday Times Bestseller and has been translated into over 30 languages.

== Synopsis ==
The novel starts with Matt reciting recollections from his childhood, where he blatantly states that he is not a nice person and has not dealt with pain since scraping his knee at the age of nine. This episode happened when he and his brother Simon went camping with their parents at Ocean Grove Holiday Park in Dorset. After scraping his knee, Simon carries Matt back to where they are staying. Shortly after, Simon, who has Down syndrome and several other medical conditions, is found dead.

In the present, Matt is being treated at the Hope Road Day Centre mental hospital. He was committed there by his parents, Richard and Susan, after his grandmother found him attempting to make a giant ant farm in his flat, which a hallucination of Simon told him to do. Matt finds his experience at the ward repetitive, and often complains about the rigid schedule. One of Matt's therapists asks him to perform a genogram – which eventually makes him remember what happened to Simon by writing about the night he died. It is revealed that Simon's death was the result of a harmless prank gone wrong, where Simon accidentally fell off of a short cliff.

After Simon's parents and the ward doctor, Edward Clement, discuss the progress Matt has made at the ward, he is discharged. The novel ends with Matt awaiting his release, stating that the story does not have an end, as he is still living it.

== Characters ==
Matthew Homes — main protagonist and narrator of the novel, diagnosed with schizophrenia at 17.

Simon Homes — Matthew's older brother with Down syndrome, who died when Matthew was nine.

Richard Homes — Matthew and Simon's father.

Susan Homes — Matthew and Simon's Mother.

Nanny Noo — Matthew's grandmother, and one of the main characters of the novel, who often helps him out.

Jacob Greening — Matthew's best and only friend, as well as former flatmate.

== Background ==
Nathan Filer, who grew up in Bristol, first had the idea for his first novel, The Shock of the Fall, when he was training to be a mental health nurse in 2002. The idea of the central character of Matthew arrived in his head as he was walking home after a shift on an acute psychiatric ward. In 2004 Filer completed his degree in mental health nursing, and in 2007 moved into academia as a research assistant — where he looked into treatments for depression. This experience has resulted in Filer having met many patients and their family, saying this aided his book and his work in nursing. After having worked on the novel for seven years, Filer decided in 2009 to study a creative writing MA and make the novel a priority. The book was eventually published on 9 May 2013, after it was subject to an 11-way auction and sold to HarperCollins for a six-figure sum.

== Reception ==
=== Reviews ===
The novel was praised by The Guardian as "a gripping and exhilarating read", the narrator's voice being "dazzlingly rendered". The British Journal of Psychiatry noted that readers who are psychiatrists hoping to find themselves portrayed within the work would be disappointed, as they are "mentioned less than a handful of times throughout". However, they praise Filer's "very talented storytelling" and "fine description of psychiatry".

The London Review of Books praises Filer's skillful interweaving of time frames and his "impressive feat of storytelling". It is critical of the techniques of suspense used, which the reviewer thought works against the story itself, and "reinforces the distinction between the narrator's point of view and the readers". Additionally, the lack of ambiguity here makes the book "fundamentally out of sympathy with its narrator".

The Telegraph praises the novel as bittersweet and wonderfully etched, noting that it is "an unsettling read but a perceptive and moving one".

=== Awards ===
The novel won the Costa Book of the Year and the Costa Book Award for First Novel in 2013, with chairman of the judges Rose Tremain saying it was "exceptionally moving without being sentimental" and "astonishingly sure-footed" for a first novel. Additionally, the novel was awarded the Betty Trask Prize of £10,000 in 2014.

In 2014 the novel was awarded Specsavers Popular Fiction Book of the Year by Specsavers National Book Award as well as the Writers' Guild of Great Britain award for Best First Novel.

The novel also made the Desmond Elliott Prize longlist in 2014.
