= My Summer of Love =

- Theatrical release poster
- Directed by: Paweł Pawlikowski
- Screenplay by: Paweł Pawlikowski; Michael Wynne
- Based on: My Summer of Love by Helen Cross
- Produced by: Chris Collins; Tanya Seghatchian
- Starring: Natalie Press; Emily Blunt; Paddy Considine
- Cinematography: Ryszard Lenczewski
- Edited by: David Charap
- Music by: Alison Goldfrapp; Will Gregory
- Production companies: BBC Films; The Film Consortium; Baker Street Media Finance; UK Film Council; Take Partnerships; Apoclaypso Pictures
- Distributed by: ContentFilm
- Release dates: 21 August 2004 (EIFF); 5 November 2004 (United Kingdom)
- Running time: 86 minutes
- Country: United Kingdom
- Language: English
- Budget: £1.5 million
- Box office: £5 million

My Summer of Love is a 2004 British drama film directed by Paweł Pawlikowski and co-written by Pawlikowski and Michael Wynne. Based on the 2001 novel of the same name by Helen Cross, the film explores the romantic relationship between two young women from different classes and backgrounds. Working class Mona (Natalie Press), whose once-hotheaded brother Phil (Paddy Considine) became a born-again Christian in prison, meets upper middle class Tamsin (Emily Blunt, in her theatrical film debut) who suffers from a lack of love in her family. Filmed in West Yorkshire, the film went on to win a BAFTA.

== Plot ==
In the Yorkshire countryside, Mona is lying in a field when Tamsin passes by on her horse. Tamsin is from a wealthy family and says she has been suspended from boarding school. Mona comes from a working-class family, and her only living relative is her brother Phil. Both girls regard their lives as mundane and unsatisfying.

Mona finds Phil getting rid of all the alcohol in their late mother's former pub, situated below their living quarters. After going to prison for petty theft and violence, Phil has undergone a religious transformation and now uses the pub to host meetings of local Christians. Mona meets her lover, Ricky, for sex in his car, but he breaks up with her afterward. The next day, the girls begin to bond as they spend the day drinking, smoking, and talking about their problems. The next day, Tamsin takes Mona to the house where Tamsin claims her father's mistress lives. Mona smashes a window of Tamsin's father's car, and the girls flee.

Tamsin purchases an engine for Mona's scooter, and they ride to a small river for a swim. Under a waterfall, the girls share a kiss. At Tamsin's house, Mona tries on her dresses. Tamsin tearfully recounts the death of her sister Sadie from anorexia. In the garden, Tamsin plays the cello while Mona dances. Tamsin kisses Mona passionately, and they later have sex, but they are briefly interrupted when Phil comes to the house looking for Mona.

Phil wants Mona to come with him to a local cross-raising ceremony, and Tamsin accompanies her. During the ceremony, Tamsin seems to be attracted to Phil. At Tamsin's house, she and Mona enter her sister Sadie's bedroom, where they find a bag of magic mushrooms. They take the mushrooms and go to a dance hall, where their raucous behaviour disturbs the patrons. They return to the river and declare their eternal love to each other, swearing a suicide pact should they ever be separated.

Phil later comes to Tamsin's house seeking Mona again. Tamsin lets him inside and pretends open up to him for religious guidance, hinting she is sexually interested in him. When Phil tries to inappropriately have sex with her, she laughs and points out he is a fraud. He angrily chokes Tamsin, then releases her and forces Mona to return home with him, locking her in her bedroom. Later, during a meeting of the Christians, she loudly fakes suicide. Phil intervenes, but Mona further mocks his religious beliefs by pretending to be possessed by a devil. Reverting to his old anger, Phil beats Mona and forces the Christians to leave. Mona packs a suitcase and leaves to be with Tamsin.

When she arrives at Tamsin's house, Mona discovers that Tamsin is returning to boarding school. She also finds out that Tamsin lied about her parents, and that her sister Sadie is still alive. Dejected, Mona goes to the river. Tamsin joins her, and dismissively tells her that she shouldn't have been so gullible. Seemingly forgiving her, Mona slips into the water, enticing Tamsin to join her, and the two girls kiss again. Mona grabs Tamsin by the throat and holds her under the water, as if to kill her, but eventually releases her and walks away.

== Cast ==
- Natalie Press as Mona
- Emily Blunt as Tamsin
- Paddy Considine as Phil
- Dean Andrews as Ricky
- Michelle Byrne as Ricky's wife
- Paul-Anthony Barber as Tamsin's father
- Lynette Edwards as Tamsin's mother
- Kathryn Sumner as Sadie

== Production ==
=== Development ===
The novel of the same title, My Summer of Love by Helen Cross, only served as a blueprint for the film. Whereas the novel pays a lot of attention to the social background of England in the 1980s, Pawel Pawlikowski focused on the relationship between Mona and Tamsin. Most of the characters in the novel were left out in the film and the character Phil was created by Pawlikowski, who had previously directed a documentary on born-again Christians in Yorkshire. Pawlikowski has expressed he was not interested in portraying typical teenage life in England, and instead wanted to give the movie a certain "timeless feeling". In an interview with the BBC, Pawlikowski said,

[...]If you wanted to make a film about British teenagers it would be ... well, it wouldn't interest me, let's put it like that. They'd be listening to music I hate, watching TV all the time, and talking about Big Brother. I needed to remove it, to get to the essence of adolescence without the paraphernalia of today. In a way I am arrested in my adolescent emotions, like most of us I think are, so [the film is] very personal, funnily enough, despite it being about two girls. I identify with Mona to an unhealthy degree [laughs], so the main thing was to make these teenagers the sort of teenagers I could relate to myself, slightly more timeless and removed from now.

=== Casting ===
Pawlikowski knew Paddy Considine from their earlier collaboration Last Resort and cast him as Phil. Casting the two lead actresses for the film proved difficult for Pawlikowski, and the overall casting procedure took about eight months. Pawlikowski searched in schools, universities, theatre groups and public castings. He discovered Natalie Press first, and sought her counterpart by holding workshops together with Press and Considine. During this process, he finally found Emily Blunt, and felt her to be the ideal Tamsin. The two actresses did a tryout with the "Pavlova-dancing scene", and their chemistry delighted Pawlikowski. Blunt, a competent cellist, is listed in the credits as the performer of "The Swan" by Camille Saint-Saëns.

=== Filming ===
The film was shot during the span of five weeks after intensive location scouting by Pawlikowski. The script was minimalist and many scenes were improvised while shooting. The scene in which Mona draws a portrait of Tamsin on the wall of her room was entirely improvised—during Pawlikowski's traveling together with Press, he discovered that she used to do a lot of drawing while she was thinking, so he decided to integrate it into the movie and made a scene out of it. The whole shoot was done on location in Todmorden during the hottest summer Yorkshire had seen in 50 years.

=== Music ===
The score of the film was written by Goldfrapp and the movie theme is a variation of the Goldfrapp song "Lovely Head", the first single from their 2000 album Felt Mountain.

== Release ==
My Summer of Love was first screened at the Edinburgh International Film Festival, being released across the UK on 5 November 2004. In the US, the film was initially screened at the Seattle International Film Festival on 20 May 2005, before going into a limited release across the US on 17 June 2005.

== Reception ==
=== Box office ===
In the US, the film grossed $90,000 on its opening weekend, in 17 theaters; and went on to be released across 63 theaters, grossing a total $1,000,915 in the 8 weeks of its release. Worldwide, it grossed an additional $1,766,061, for a lifetime gross of $2,766,976.

=== Critical response ===
On Rotten Tomatoes the film has an approval rating of 90% based on reviews from 92 critics, with an average rating of 7.6/10. The website's critical consensus states: "My Summer of Love is a moody, bittersweet love story featuring outstanding performances from the leads." On Metacritic it has a weighted average score of 82 out of 100 based on 31 reviews.

Roger Ebert of the Chicago Sun-Times, who gave it three out of four, described it as "a movie that is more about being an age, than coming-of-age" and appreciated Pawlikowski's pacing. The New York Times's A.O. Scott termed it "a triumph of mood and implication", and James Berardinelli of ReelViews called it a "gem" lost in the "hype" of Hollywood blockbusters. Ty Burr of The Boston Globe deemed it "a conceit on a number of levels" and "confused between an 'artistic' lesbian movie and Heavenly Creatures", while commending Blunt's performance and the cinematography and declaring that "at its most interesting, [it] offers us the sight of people desperately embracing faith in the hopes it will pull them through". Steve Schneider of Orlando Weekly called it "slight and predictable at its core" but praised the performances and the "black humor" between the female characters "that endows the movie with most of its genuinely entertaining moments".

Autostraddle listed the film as number 19 in a ranking of the 102 Best Lesbian Movies of All Time.

=== Awards and nominations ===
My Summer of Love won the Alexander Korda Award for Best British Film at the 2005 BAFTA Awards, the Directors Guild of Great Britain Award for Outstanding Directorial Achievement in British Film, and the award for Best New British Feature at the 2004 Edinburgh Film Festival. At the Evening Standard British Film Awards, Pawlikowski won for Best Screenplay, as did both Blunt and Press for Most Promising Newcomer. Natalie Press won the award for British Newcomer of the Year at the London Film Critics Circle Awards.

The film also received five nominations at the 2004 British Independent Film Awards, four European Film Awards nominations, and five nominations at the London Film Critics Circle Awards.

== See also ==
- List of lesbian, gay, bisexual, or transgender-related films by storyline
- New Queer Cinema
