= Andrew Davison (theologian) =

British Christian theologian and professor (born 1974)

The Reverend Canon Andrew Davison
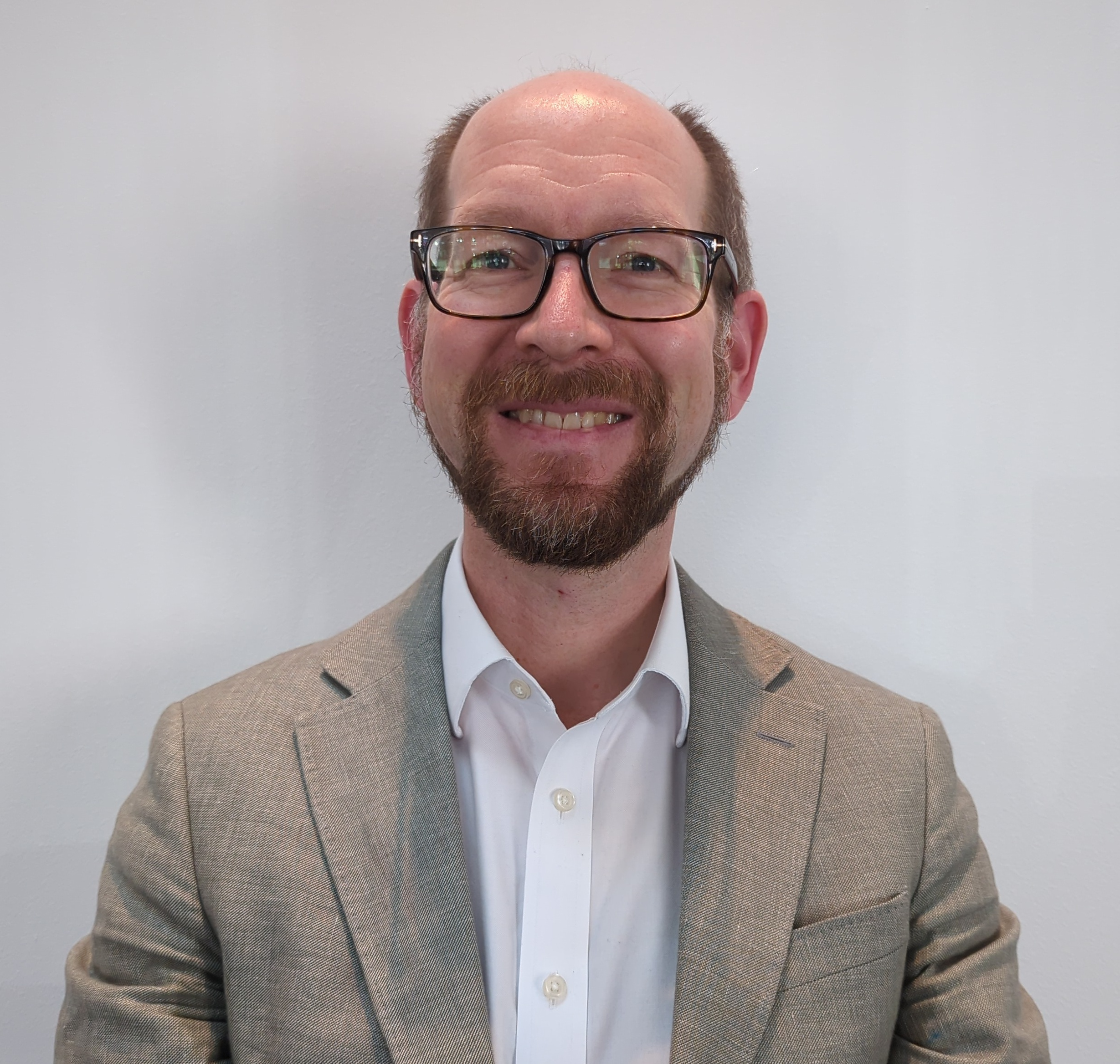
- Davison in 2025
- Born: 24 June 1974 (age 52); Beverley, East Riding of Yorkshire, England
- Occupation: Theologian

Academic background
- Education: Merton College, Oxford; Corpus Christi College, Cambridge

Andrew Paul Davison (born 24 June 1974) is a British Anglican priest and Christian theologian, who is Regius Professor of Divinity and residentiary canon at Christ Church, Oxford. He was previously Starbridge Professor of Theology and Natural Sciences in the Faculty of Divinity, University of Cambridge, and a Fellow of Corpus Christi College, Cambridge, where he was also Dean of Chapel since 2019.

== Biography ==
Davison was educated at Cottingham High School in the East Riding of Yorkshire, Merton College, Oxford (where he studied for an undergraduate degree in chemistry and a DPhil degree in biochemistry) and at Corpus Christi College, Cambridge (where he studied for an undergraduate degree and PhD degree in theology). He trained for ordination at Westcott House.

Following ordination, Davison served his curacy in Southeast London, in the parish of St Dunstan, Bellingham. His first teaching appointment was at St Stephen’s House, Oxford, as tutor in doctrine. He was concurrently junior chaplain of Merton College. He moved to Cambridge in 2010 to be Tutor in Christian Doctrine at Westcott House. In 2014, he was appointed as the second Starbridge Lecturer in Theology and Natural Sciences in the Faculty of Divinity of the University of Cambridge (subsequently senior lecturer, then associate professor and, from 2023, Starbridge Professor of Theology and Natural Sciences). Alongside his lectureship, he became a Fellow of Corpus Christi College.

He is a Canon Emeritus Philosopher at St Albans Cathedral, having been Honorary Canon Philosopher (2015–21), and a founding member of the Leverhulme Centre for Life in the Universe. He has twice been a member of the Anglican–Catholic dialogue for England and Wales, and participated in the Church of England's commission on marriage and sexuality. For the academic years 2022–2024, he was the Distinguished Visiting Fellow in Science and Theology at the Center of Theological Inquiry, Princeton, New Jersey.

Davison was in September 2024 appointed Regius Professor of Divinity in the University of Oxford, together with the dignity of Canon of the Cathedral Church of Christ in Oxford.

Davison is a systematic and philosophical theologian, and a notable Anglican Thomist, who also writes on pastoral and liturgical topics. His Cambridge PhD degree, under the supervision of Professor Catherine Pickstock, was on understandings of finitude in the work of Thomas Aquinas and Duns Scotus. He is a prolific book author and editor, whose titles include Imaginative Apologetics: Theology, Philosophy and the Catholic Tradition, Participation in God: A Study in Christian Doctrine and Metaphysics, For the Parish: A Critique of Fresh Expressions, and Astrobiology and Christian Doctrine: Exploring the Implications of Life in the Universe (2024). His work on the theological implications of finding life or even intelligence beyond Earth have been the subject of attention in the media.

== Bibliography ==
- For the Parish: A Critique of Fresh Expressions (with Professor Alison Milbank). London: SCM Press. 2010.
- Lift Up Your Hearts (with Canon Andrew Nunn and Canon Toby Wright), London: SPCK. 2010.
- Imaginative Apologetics: Theology, Philosophy and the Catholic Tradition, London: SCM Press. 2011; Ada, MI: Baker. 2012.
- Why Sacraments? London: SPCK. 2013.
- The Love of Wisdom: An Introduction to Philosophy for Theologians. London: SCM Press. 2013. (Translated into Dutch as Uit liefde voor de wijsheid: de grote filosofen en hun invloed op de theologie. Utrecht: Kok. 2014.)
- Care for the Dying: A Practical and Pastoral Guide (with Dr Sioned Evans). London: Canterbury Press. 2014.
- Blessing. London: Canterbury Press. 2014.
- Amazing Love: Theology for Understanding Discipleship, Sexuality and Mission London: Darton, Longman and Todd. 2016 (written by Davison in collaboration with a working group)
- The God we Proclaim: Sermons on the Apostles’ Creed (edited with Dr John Hughes), Eugene, OR: Cascade. 2017
- Participation in God: An Exploration in Christian Doctrine and Metaphysics. Cambridge: Cambridge University. 2019.
- Astrobiology and Christian Doctrine: Exploring the Implications of Life in the Universe. Cambridge University Press. 2023.

Academic offices
Preceded by Graham Ward	Regius Professor of Divinity at the University of Oxford; 2024–present	Incumbent
