= Rachel Connolly =

- Born: 1993 (age 32–33)
- Education: University of Manchester
- Years active: 2018–present

Rachel Connolly (born 1993) is an Irish author, journalist, critic and essayist. Her debut novel Lazy City (2023) won a Betty Trask Award.

== Early life ==
Connolly was born in Belfast and is from a Catholic background. Connolly attended Methodist College Belfast. She graduated from the University of Manchester with a degree in maths and physics.

== Career ==
After graduating from university, Connolly had her first full-time job working for an insurance company as a risk analyst. She took leave to pursue two newspaper internships, including at The Independent. In 2018, Connolly earned a Google Fellowship to join the RTÉ investigations department. During this time, she also started freelancing. As a critic and essayist, Connolly has contributed to publications including The Guardian, the London Review of Books, the Financial Times, The New Republic, The Cut and The New York Times.

In 2022, Canongate Books acquired the rights to publish Connolly's debut novel Lazy City in 2023. The contemporary novel follows a character who moves back to Belfast from London after the death of a friend. Lazy City won a Betty Trask Award and was selected as an RTÉ Book of the Week by Aimée Walsh. Connolly was named a summer 2023 emerging author by Dazed.

== Personal life ==
Connolly lives in London.

== Bibliography ==
- Lazy City (2023)
