= Imogen Hermes Gowar =

British writer

- Citizenship: United Kingdom
- Education: University of East Anglia
- Occupation: Writer
- Writing career
- Language: English
- Genre: Historical fiction
- Notable works: The Mermaid and Mrs Hancock (2018)
- Notable awards: Betty Trask Award (2018)
- Website: www.imogenhermesgowar.co.uk

Imogen Hermes Gowar is a British author. She published her debut novel The Mermaid and Mrs Hancock in 2019; it won a Betty Trask Award and was shortlisted for the Women's Prize for Fiction.

== Personal life and early career ==
Gowar's great-grandmother was the engraver and sculptor Gertrude Hermes.

Gowar studied archaeology, anthropology and art history at the University of East Anglia. She then worked in museums, including in Visitor Services at the British Museum, while writing short fiction inspired by the exhibits. She also worked as a barista in London prior to publishing her first book.

== Writing career ==
In 2013, Gowar won the Malcolm Bradbury Memorial Scholarship to study for a master's degree in creative writing at the University of East Anglia. Her dissertation developed into her debut novel The Mermaid and Mrs Hancock. The novel won a Betty Trask Award in 2019 and was shortlisted for the Women's Prize for Fiction and the Sunday Times Young Writer of the Year Award in 2018. It was also longlisted for the Desmond Elliott Prize in 2018.

As of January 2026, Gowar was working on a novel about Lady Eleanor Talbot (c.1436-1468), who was possibly secretly married to Edward IV. She became interested in Eleanor through working on an augmented reality tour of Norwich which tells Eleanor's story and which Gowar wrote and narrates.
