= Ardashir Vakil =

Indian-born British author

Ardashir "Ardu" Vakil is an Indian-born British author whose first novel, Beach Boy, won the Betty Trask Award in 1997 and was shortlisted for the Whitbread First Novel Award. His second novel, One Day was shortlisted for the Encore Award.

== Education ==
Born in 1962 in Bombay and educated at The Doon School, and University of Cambridge, he has lived in London since 1997 with his wife and two children. He teaches Creative Writing at Goldsmiths, University of London.

== Works ==
- Beach Boy. Scribner. 1998. ISBN 978-0-684-85299-7.
- One Day. Hamish Hamilton. 2003. ISBN 978-0-241-14132-8.
