= Hessle High School =

Academy school in Hessle, East Riding of Yorkshire, England

Coordinates: 53°43′30″N 00°27′09″W

Hessle High School and Sixth Form College

Location
- Heads Lane; Hessle, East Riding of Yorkshire, HU13 0JQ; England

Information
- Type: Academy, day school
- Motto: Prosperum iter facias
- Established: 1947
- Founder: Sarah Young
- Local authority: East Riding of Yorkshire Council
- Department for Education URN: 137306 Tables
- Ofsted: Reports
- Head teacher: J. Nixon
- Gender: Mixed-sex education
- Age: 11 to 19
- Enrolment: 1,300 (approx.)
- Houses: Ariel, Cassio, Orlando, Portia
- Website: https://www.thehessleacademy.co.uk/hessle-high

Hessle High School and Sixth Form College is a co-educational academy school and sixth form college, situated in the town of Hessle, in the East Riding of Yorkshire, five miles west of Kingston upon Hull's city centre.

== History and location ==
The school, originally located over two sites – Heads Lane and Boothferry Road – became one site at Heads Lane, in January 2016, as part of the Priority Schools Building Programme. Hessle High School originally centred on Tranby House, which was built in 1807 by a local Kingston upon Hull merchant who made his fortune in the shipping industry. The house was inherited and lived in by successive generations of Barkworths until Algernon Henry Barkworth, who survived the sinking of the RMS Titanic. After Algernon Barkworth's death in 1945, the house was bequeathed to the local education authority to become a school, which it did in 1947 as Tranby High School. The house is an almost exact duplicate of the now-demolished Tranby Lodge, and Hessle Mount, now an independent private preparatory school. In 1967, Tranby House became a Grade II listed building to ensure its history and architecture are protected.

In August 2011, the school was granted academy status. In October 2016, following a refurbishment, Tranby House opened as the Hessle Sixth Form College. The sixth form remains part of a consortium with Wolfreton School and Cottingham High School, which was established in 2009. The consortium allows pupils to study post-16 courses at the partnership schools. In January 2017, Penshurst Primary School became a through school with Hessle High School and Sixth Form College. –. Before that the schools were federated.

== Ofsted inspections ==
During Ofsted's school inspection in December 2014, the school was rated "Good (Grade 2)" in all aspects.

During Ofsted's school inspection in September 2018, the school was rated "Good (Grade 2)" in all aspects. During Ofsted's school inspection in January 2007, the school was rated "Satisfactory (Grade 2)" in all aspects. During Ofsted's school inspection in June 2010, the school was rated "Good (Grade 2)" in all aspects.

== Notable alumni ==
- Michael Jibson, actor
- Derren Litten, actor and comedy writer
- Stephen C. West, biochemist
- Calum Scott, singer
- Lucy Beaumont, comedian
