= Rajeev Balasubramanyam =

British writer

Rajeev Balasubramanyam (born 1974) is a British writer. His novels include, In Beautiful Disguises (Bloomsbury, 2000), The Dreamer (HarperCollins, 2010), Starstruck (ThePigeonhole.com, 2016) and Professor Chandra Follows His Bliss (Dial Press, 2019). His short stories have been published in numerous anthologies across the world, including New Writing 12, Fugue, and The Missouri Review. He writes regularly for VICE, Salon, The Washington Post, New Statesman, Frieze, the London Review of Books, The Rumpus, and Media Diversified.

== Biography ==
Balasubramanyam was born in Lancashire, England. His parents are from Bangalore, India, and were both Fulbright Scholars to the United States, a country where Balasubramanyam spent part of his childhood. After completing his secondary education at Lancaster Royal Grammar School, he went on to study Politics, Philosophy and Economics at Oxford University and Development Studies at the University of Cambridge. He later acquired a PhD in English Literature from Lancaster University.

He has since lived in many different places, including London, the Suffolk coast, Kathmandu, Berlin, Manchester, and Hong Kong, where he was appointed as a Research Scholar in the Society of Scholars at the University of Hong Kong.

Balasubramanyam is currently a Hemera Foundation Fellow, for authors and artists with a meditation or spiritual practice. His experiences of journeying across the United States are documented in his web-diary, "American Pilgrimage".

== Writing ==
Balasubramanyam's first novel, In Beautiful Disguises, was the winner of a Betty Trask Prize in 1999 before it was even published. It was later accepted by Bloomsbury, and went on to be nominated for the Guardian Fiction Award and shortlisted for the BBC Asia Prize. The Guardian described it as: "Colourful, spirited and crackling with charm. It is easy to see why Balasubramanyam is already a Betty Trask Winner". Nadeem Aslam commented that it was: "The best first novel since I can't remember when. I made nine pages of closely written notes on its various metaphors, insights and similes. Brilliant!"

2010 saw the publication of Balasubramanyam's long-awaited second novel, The Dreamer, based on a short story that won an Ian St James Prize in 2001. It is the story of Shashi, a British-Asian actor who suffers a nervous breakdown and takes to his bed, whereupon his dreams take on a life of their own. India Today' described it as "a meditative, haunting experiment in stream of consciousness" with "evocative, sweetly melancholic lines sprinkled through the length of the book".

In 2004, Balasubramanyam won the Clarissa Luard Award for the best British writer under 35.

In 2016, ThePigeonhole.com published his new novel, Starstruck, in serial form online, releasing a different chapter each day in each of which a protagonist has an unexpected, surreal, or comic encounter with a celebrity.

Balasubramanyam writes regularly for newspapers and magazines including VICE, Salon, the Washington Post, New Statesman, Frieze, the London Review of Books, The Rumpus, and Media Diversified.

In 2019 Balasubramanyam's latest novel, Professor Chandra Follows His Bliss was published by Chatto & Windus (UK) and Dial Press (USA) to widespread critical acclaim. It was translated into six languages and was the UK Bookseller Magazine's Book of the Month in June. The novel has been described by Marian Keyes as, "tender and compassionate, written with exquisite care and verve, and so so SO funny."
