= Cottingham High School =

Secondary school in Cottingham, East Riding of Yorkshire, England

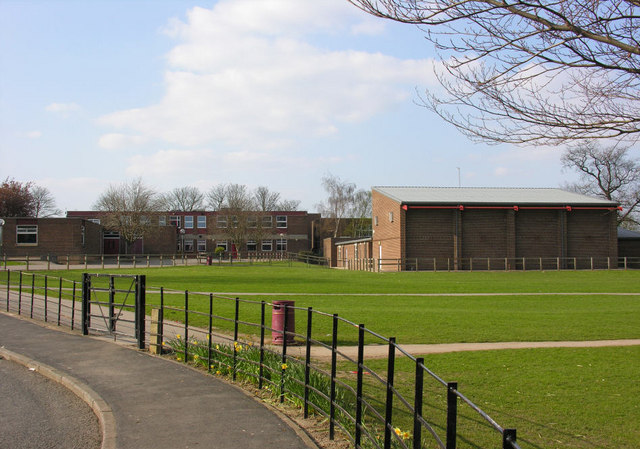

Location
- Harland Way; Cottingham, East Riding of Yorkshire, HU16 5PX; England
- Coordinates: 53.7890°N 0.4321°W

Information
- Type: Secondary school Academy
- Established: 1955
- Specialist: Arts
- Department for Education URN: 136921 Tables
- Head teacher: Jay Kerby
- Age: 11 to 16
- Enrolment: 829 pupils
- Website: http://www.cottinghamhigh.net/

Cottingham High School is a secondary school in Cottingham in the East Riding of Yorkshire, England. The school has specialist Arts College status, with facilities for media arts, music, drama and dance for performing arts. In July 2011 the school became an Academy.

== History ==
Cottingham High School was originally named Cottingham Secondary School and was established in April 1955 as a Secondary Modern school. The school site is on what was formerly Cottingham Grange, built in 1802. Part of the land which belonged to Cottingham Grange is now part of 'The Lawns', owned by the University of Hull for student halls of residence.

It became Cottingham High School in September 1973, when it became a comprehensive.

Because of the increased numbers of pupils attending the school, the original building was no longer large enough, and by September 1975 a new Science and Technical block was completed together with a second gymnasium and new sports hall. In 1978 a new Humanities and Modern Languages block and a Sixth Form block was completed. In 2000 a new Drama and Music block was built, and a Business Studies block was completed in 2003.

In late April 1981 an attempt was made to set fire to the headmaster's office. In January 1989 the house of the deputy head, Paul Hill, caught fire in Cherry Burton.

There was another fire in April 1994, damaging four classrooms.

In September 2004 Cottingham High School gained Specialist in Media and Performing Arts status, which provided extra equipment and facilities, including a recording studio, film editing suite and ICT facilities.

In September 2009 the school became part of the Haltemprice Consortium along with Wolfreton School and Hessle High School.

In July 2011 the secondary school became an Academy.

In May 2015 the school received a Grade 3 'Requires Improvement' rating from Ofsted.

== Headteachers ==
- 1955, 44 year old Eric Greenwood
- January 1972, Clive J Whyley, lived at Hutton Cranswick
- September 1988, Mike Mahoney
- January 1994, Pam Child, former deputy head of Boston Spa School
- In March 2012 Elizabeth Logan was suspended from her post as head of the school. She resigned from her post due to "personal and professional reasons" on 21 August 2012.

== Former teachers ==
- Deputy head, sports teacher, 40-year-old Brian S Chubb was the local Conservative candidate, moving to the school in 1966. He was married with two daughters and lived on Queen's Drive, and was a FA football referee from September 1971, and was elected to Beverley Borough Council for the Castle ward on November 20 1980. In 1982 he referreed a England - Holland schoolboys' football international. He had been a referee in all four football divisions. He taught at Westminster City Grammar School, and played inside forward.

== Notable alumni ==
- Karen Almond – England and Great Britain international rugby union player. Captained England to victory in the 1994 Women's Rugby World Cup.
- Andrew Davison – Regius Professor of Divinity at Christ Church, Oxford
- Stuart Pearson – professional footballer, England international and retired Football coach
- Ben Pipes – London 2012 Team GB Men's Volleyball Team Captain.
- Dave Stead – drummer with UK band the Beautiful South
- Will Rhodes- England U19 Cricket Team Captain.
