= Radhika Jha =

Indian novelist

- Born: 1970 (age 55–56); Delhi
- Education: Amherst College, University of Chicago
- Occupations: Author, Odissi dancer

Radhika Jha (born 1970) is an Indian novelist who won the French Prix Guerlain award in 2002 for her first novel, Smell.

== Early life ==
Jha was born in New Delhi in 1970 and grew up in Mumbai. She lived in Tokyo for 6 years and thoroughly immersed herself in all aspects of Japanese culture. She then moved to Beijing and is now based in Athens with her ambassador husband and two children.

== Career and education ==
Jha studied anthropology at Amherst College, Massachusetts, did her master's degree in political science at the University of Chicago and lived in Paris as an exchange student. Jha is also a trained Odissi dancer.

Jha started her career as a journalist and worked for Hindustan Times and Business World writing on culture, the environment and the economy. She also worked for the Rajiv Gandhi Foundation, where she started up the Interact project for the education of the children of the victims of terrorism in different parts of India.

Smell was her debut novel published in 1999.

== Books ==
- Smell, Soho Press 1999 ISBN 9781569472415

Worldwide publishers include: Penguin India (original publisher), Editions Philippe Picquier France, Neri Pozza Italy, Arena Holland, Soho Press USA, Quartet UK, Blanvalet/Bertelsmann Germany, Natur och Kultur Sweden, Dom Quixote Portugal, Diigisi Greece, Fuso Japan, Ediciones el Cobre Spanish, Alfa Narodna Knjiga Serbia, Leaders Publishers Korea, Editura Leda Romania, Janet 45 Bulgaria

- The Elephant and the Maruti: Stories, Penguin Books 2003 ISBN 9780143030454

Worldwide publishers include: Penguin India, Arena Holland, Neri Pozza Italy, Editions Philippe Picquier France, Dom Quixote Portugal, Defne Yayinevi Turkey

- Lanterns on their horns, 2009 ISBN 9781905636655

Worldwide publishers include: HarperCollins India, Editions Philippe Picquier France, Neri Pozza Italy, Beautiful Books UK (rights reverted), House of Books Netherlands

- My Beautiful Shadow, HarperCollins 2014 ISBN 978-1-909762-47-3

Worldwide publishers include: HarperCollins India, Editions Philippe Picquier France, Sellerio Editore Italy, AST Russia, Alianza Spain & Latin America, Jacaranda Books UK

== See also ==
- List of Indian writers
