= Rest in peace =

Epitaph or idiomatic expression to someone who has died

Rest in peace (R.I.P.), a phrase from the Latin requiescat in pace (Ecclesiastical Latin: [rekwiˈeskat in ˈpatʃe]), is sometimes used in traditional Christian services and prayers, such as in the Catholic, Lutheran, Anglican, and Methodist denominations, to wish the soul of a decedent eternal rest and peace. It became ubiquitous on headstones in the 19th century, and is widely used today when mentioning someone's death. In other uses within the English language, it can be used to describe finality, in circumstances unrelated to death.

== Description ==
The phrase dormit in pace (English: '[he] sleeps in peace') was found in the catacombs of the early Christians and indicated that "they died in the peace of the Church, that is, united in Christ." The abbreviation R.I.P., meaning requiescat in pace, 'may he/she rest in peace' (present/subjunctive/active/3rd person/singular), continues to be engraved on the gravestones of Christians, especially in the Catholic, Lutheran, and Anglican denominations.

In the Tridentine Requiem Mass of the Catholic Church, the phrase appears several times.

Other variations include "Requiescat in pace et in amore" for "May he/she rest in peace and love" and "In pace requiescat et in amore". The word order is variable because Latin syntactical relationships are indicated by the inflexional endings, not by word order. If "Rest in peace" is used in an imperative mood, it would be "Requiesce in pace" (acronym R.I.P.) in the second person singular, or "Requiescite in pace" in the second person plural.

== History ==
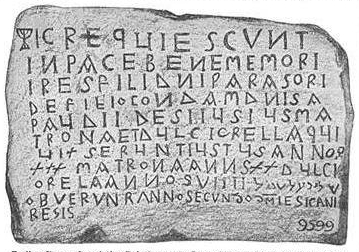
A 7th-century gravestone from Narbonne beginning with requiescunt in pace and includes the Hebrew phrase "שלום על שראל" (peace be upon Israel). It has been interpreted variously as an "inscription relating to the Jews of France", or as a Jewish inscription.

Funerary texts with wishes for the deceased in the afterlife are as old as writing itself – the first known phonetic inscriptions were funerary texts from Ur thought to be wishes for an eternal life. The phrase dormit in pace was first found on tombstones some time before the fifth century. It became ubiquitous on the tombs of Christians in the 18th century, and for High Church Anglicans, Methodists, as well as Roman Catholics in particular, it was a prayerful request that their soul should find peace in the afterlife. When the phrase became conventional, the absence of a reference to the soul led people to suppose that it was the physical body that was enjoined to lie peacefully in the grave. This is associated with the Christian doctrine of the particular judgment; that is, that the soul is parted from the body upon death, but that the soul and body will be reunited on Judgment Day.

=== Use in various religions ===
==== Irish Protestantism ====
In 2017, members of the Orange Order in Northern Ireland called on Protestants to stop using the phrase "RIP" or "Rest in Peace". Wallace Thompson, the secretary of the Evangelical Protestant Society, said on a BBC Radio Ulster programme that he would encourage Protestants to refrain from using the term "RIP". Thompson said that he regards "RIP" as a prayer for the dead, which he believes contradicts biblical doctrine. In the same radio programme, Presbyterian Ken Newell disagreed that people are praying for the dead when they use the phrase.

==== Judaism ====
The expression "rest in peace" is "not commonly used in Jewish contexts", though some commentators say that it is "consistent with Jewish practice". The traditional Hebrew expression עליו השלום, literally 'may peace be upon him', is sometimes rendered in English as 'may he rest in peace'. On the other hand, some Jews object to using the phrase for Jews, considering it to reflect a Christian perspective.

== Gallery ==
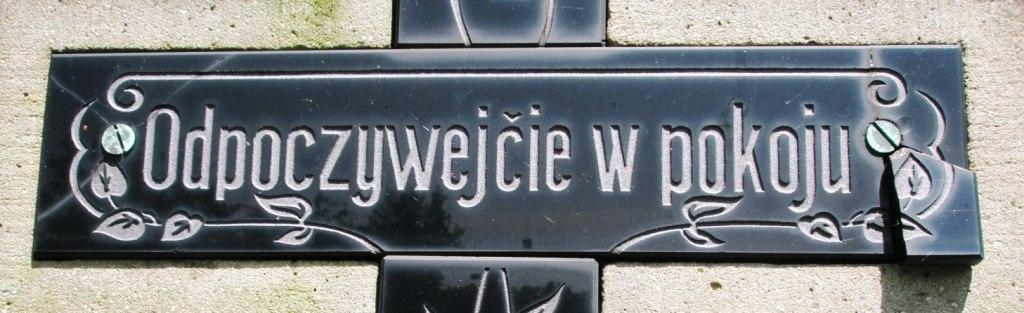
This Lutheran Christian grave reads "Rest in Peace" in the local Cieszyn Silesian Polish dialect.

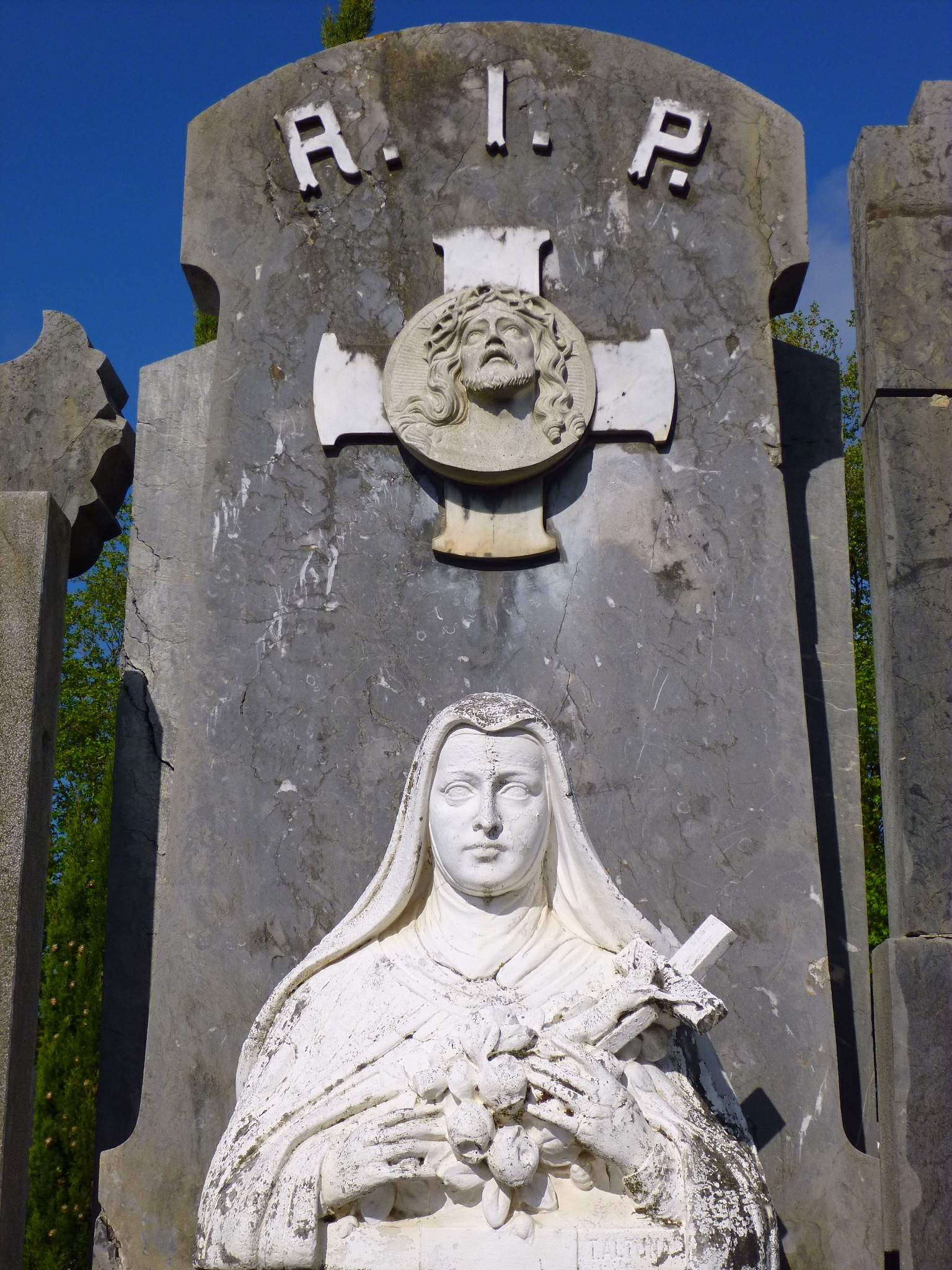
The epitaph R.I.P. on a headstone in a churchyard of San Sebastián

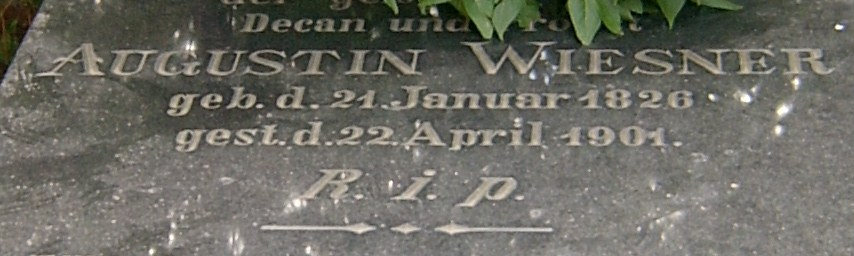
Excerpt from gravestone in Święciechowa, showing R.I.P

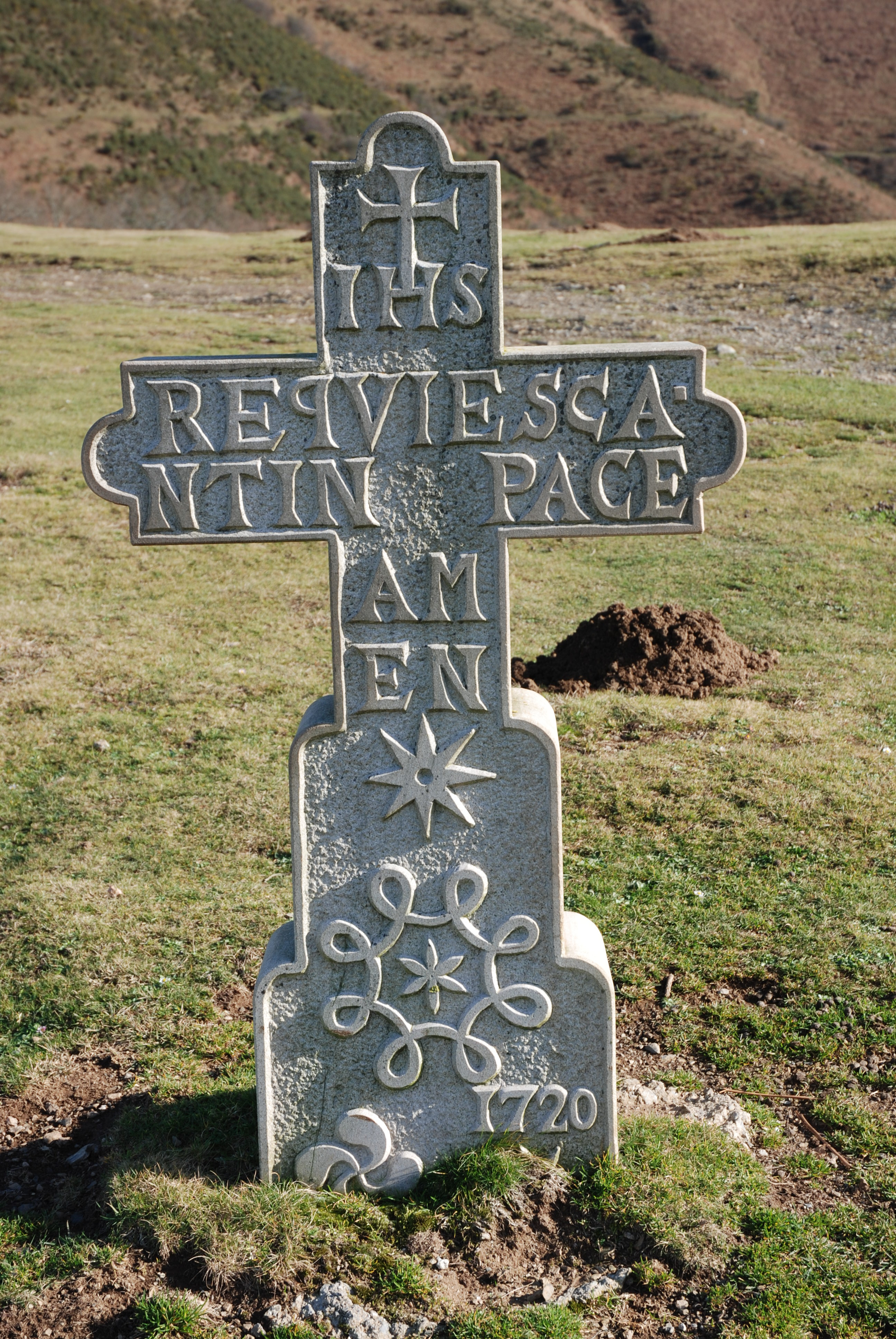
This cross from 1720 bears the complete Latin phrase in its plural form ("Requiescant in pace")

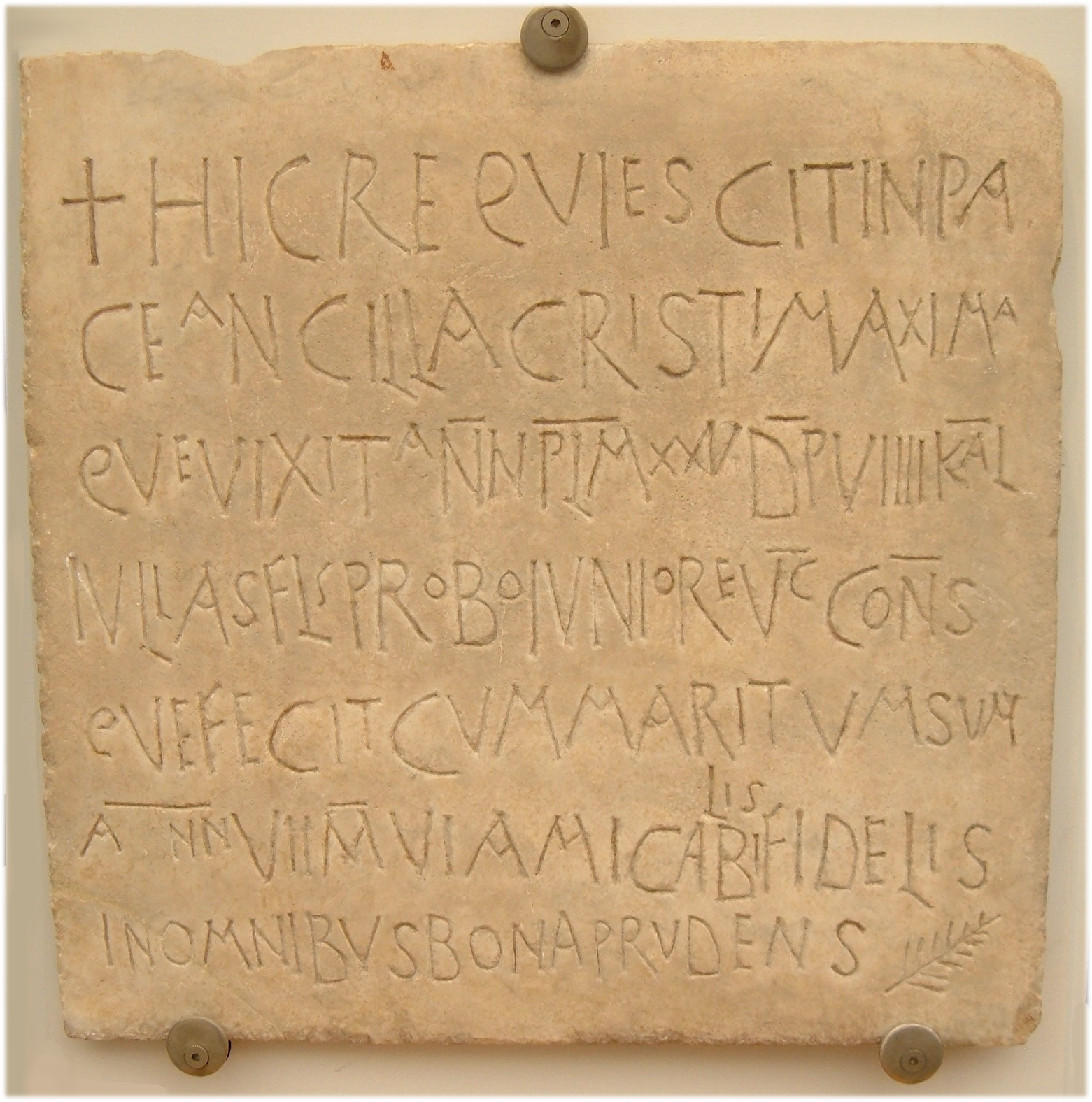
This funerary tablet from 525 AD begins with the phrase

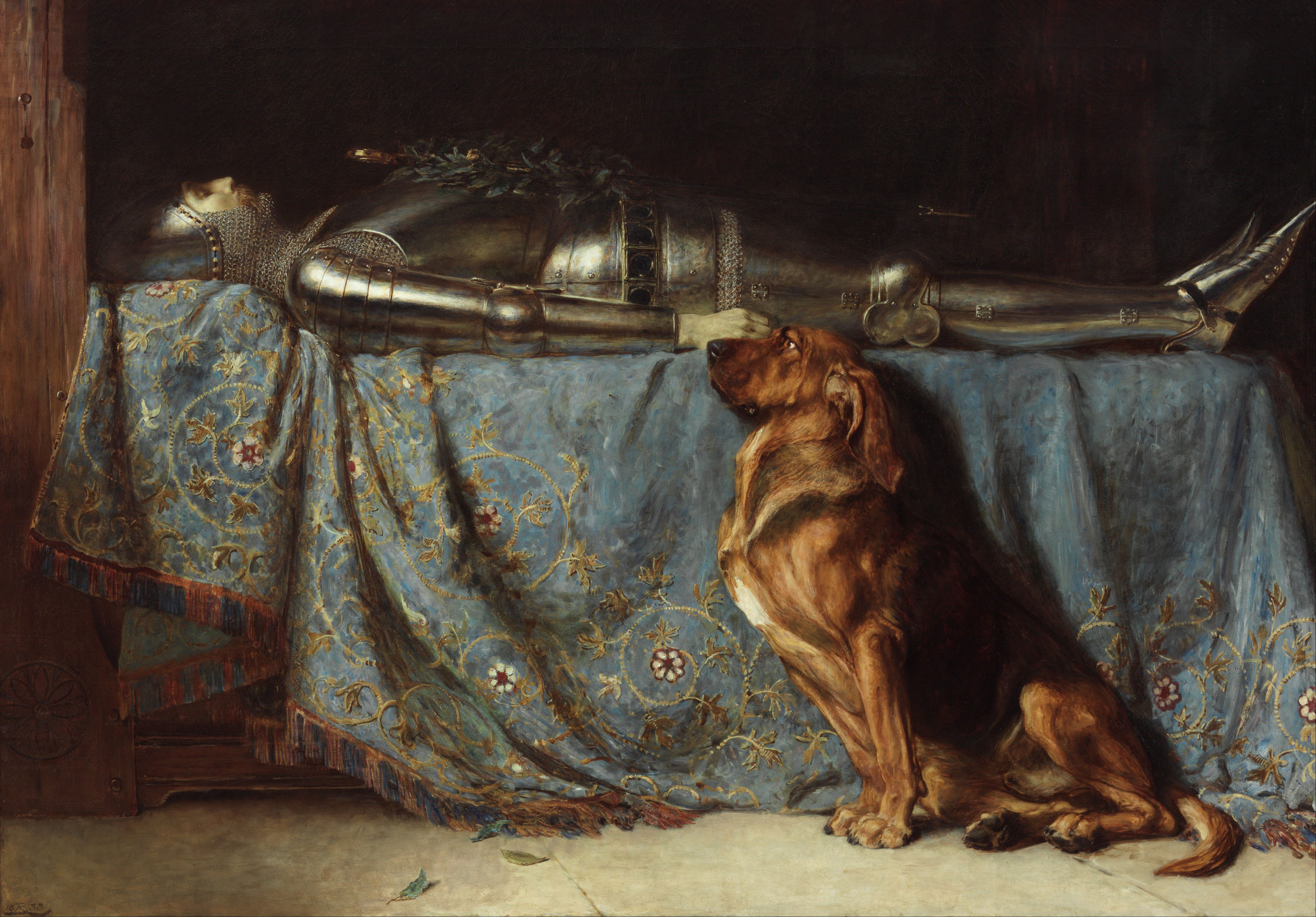
Requiescat, oil on canvas painting by Briton Rivière, 1888, Art Gallery of New South Wales.

== See also ==
- Allhallowtide
- Eternal Rest
- From God We Came, From God We Return
- Honorifics for the dead in Judaism
- Maa Kheru
- Rest in power
- Sit tibi terra levis
- List of Latin phrases
