= Helen Cross (author) =

English writer (born 1967)

- Born: 1967 (age 58–59); Newbald, East Yorkshire, England
- Education: Goldsmiths, University of London; University of East Anglia
- Notable work: My Summer of Love
- Awards: Betty Trask Award (2002)
- Website: www.helencross.net

Helen Cross (born 1967, Newbald) is an English writer best known for her 2001 book My Summer of Love. In addition to novels, Cross also writes audio dramas, primarily for BBC Radio 4, and teaches creative writing and podcasting at Leeds Beckett University and the Arvon Foundation. Her 2012 Blue Eyed Boy, an audio play about her father's childhood, was a finalist for the Innovation Award at the 2012 BBC Audio Drama Awards.

== Biography ==
Helen Cross was born and raised in Newbald, East Yorkshire, England. Her father was born Lawrence Duncombe and was evacuated to Willerby during The Blitz. He was adopted by a childless family and was separated from his birth family until adulthood. Cross used this as the basis of her 2012 radio drama Blue Eyed Boy, which was styled as a documentary on BBC Radio 4. It was short-listed an Innovation Award at the 2012 BBC Audio Drama Awards. Cross received a BA in English and drama from Goldsmiths, University of London, followed by an MA in creative writing from University of East Anglia in 1997. After finishing her graduate degree, she worked for several years at Royal Shakespeare Theatre as a writer. In 1998, she was director of the Birmingham Readers and Writers festival.

Cross's first novel, My Summer of Love, was published in 2001 and won a Betty Trask Award in 2002. It follows two teenage Yorkshire girls from different social classes in the 1980s and the toxic love that evolves between them. The film adaptation was released in 2004. It was directed by Paweł Pawlikowski and starred Emily Blunt and Natalie Press. It won several awards, including the Alexander Korda Award for Best British Film at the 2005 BAFTAs, beating out Harry Potter and the Prisoner of Azkaban and Shaun of the Dead for the prize. Her next novel, The Secrets She Keeps, was published in 2005. This book centered on John, a 19-year-old nanny, and his infatuation with his employer's wealthy world. It was partially inspired by Cross' time as an 18-year-old nanny in Manhattan. In 2009, she published her third novel, Spilt Milk, Black Coffee, an interracial romance about a 26-year-old Muslim man and his older white coworker. It was adapted to film and directed by Nat Luurtsema. The Clean Up was shortlisted for Film London Microwave in 2016.

Cross has written short stories for anthologies, including "The Uniform" in Her Majesty: 21 Stories by Women (2003) and "Fur" in Wolf-Girls: Dark Tales of Teeth, Claws and Lycogyny (2012). In 2014, she wrote a short film, Deeds Not Words, about suffragettes in Birmingham. She also teaches classes in creative writing and podcasting, including for the Arvon Foundation and Leeds Beckett University. In 2004, she was an Arts Council International Fellow at Banff Centre in Canada and in 2007 was writer-in-residence at the University of Mumbai. On 20 December 2024, she played on the Goldsmiths team on the 2020 University Challenge Christmas special alongside David Dibosa, Dave Myers and Rachel Cowgill.

== Personal life ==
Cross lives in Birmingham with her partner Andy. She has two daughters.

== Works ==
Novels

- My Summer of Love. Bloomsbury Publishing. 2001. ISBN 0-7475-5276-2.
- The Secrets She Keeps. Bloomsbury Publishing. 2006. ISBN 0-7475-7891-5.
- Spilt Milk, Black Coffee. Bloomsbury Publishing. 2010. ISBN 1-4088-1215-0.

Radio dramas

- One Day - BBC Radio 4. Premiered 30 December 2003.
- Tolkien in Love - BBC Radio 4. Premiered 2012.
- Blue Eyed Boy - BBC Radio 4. Premiered 2012.
- BBC Afternoon Play: The Return of Rowena the Wonderful - BBC Radio 4. Premiered September 2013.
- The Essay: Coming Home - BBC Radio 4. Premiered 2022.
- English Rose - BBC Radio 4. Premiered 1 December 2023.
