= Rowan Hisayo Buchanan =

British-American writer (born 1989)

Rowan Hisayo Buchanan FRSL
- Born: 2 June 1989 (age 37); Westminster, London, England
- Education: Columbia University (BA); University of Wisconsin–Madison (MFA)
- Occupation: Writer
- Children: 1
- Writing career
- Genres: Fiction; short story; novel
- Notable works: Harmless Like You, Starling Days
- Website: rowanhisayo.com

Signature
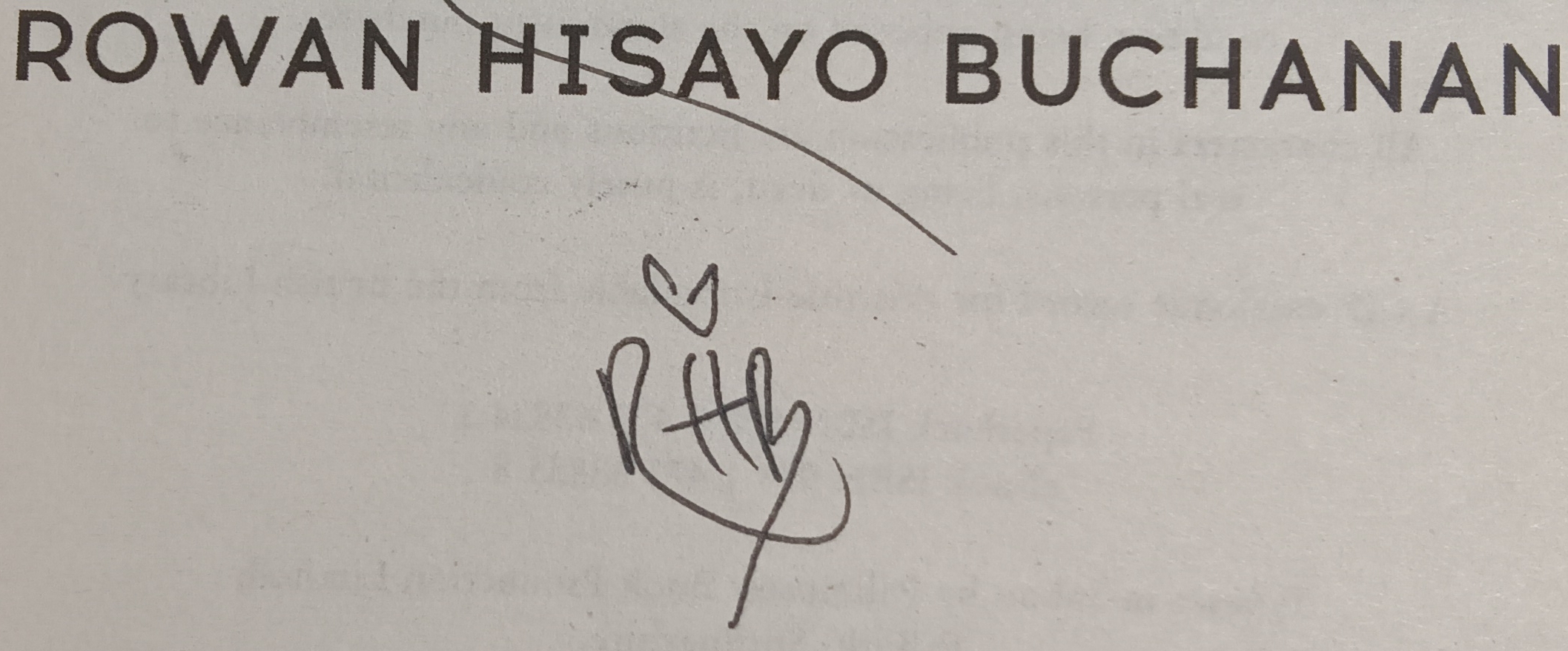

Rowan Hisayo Buchanan FRSL (born 2 June 1989) is a British and American writer. Her novels include Harmless Like You, which received a Betty Trask Award and the 2017 Author's Club Best First Novel Award, and Starling Days. She is the editor of Go Home!, an anthology of stories by Asian American writers. She was elected a Fellow of the Royal Society of Literature in 2023.

== Early life and education ==
Buchanan was born in central London to a half-Chinese, half-Japanese American mother and a British father, and grew up between London and New York. She earned her B.A. from Columbia University, where she was a Core Scholar. She lived in Tokyo, Japan, while working as an intern for a management consulting firm, then earned her M.F.A. from the University of Wisconsin–Madison.

== Career ==
=== Novels ===
Buchanan's debut novel, Harmless Like You, was published in the U.K. by Sceptre in 2016 and in the U.S. by W. W. Norton in 2017. The novel follows the overlapping stories of Yuki Oyama, a Japanese-American girl in 1960's New York who fights to become an artist, and her estranged son Jay, who in 2016 must travel to Berlin to confront a mother who abandoned their family when he was two. There was a "fierce" six-way bidding war among publishers for the manuscript, and Harmless Like You was praised by Lorrie Moore and Alexander Chee.

The Guardian called Harmless Like You a "startling debut" in England. The book won a Betty Trask Award and the Author's Club Best First Novel Award. The novel was also shortlisted for the Desmond Elliot Prize, but did not win. In America, The New York Times Book Review placed the hardback and paperback releases of the novel in its "Editor's Choice" section. National Public Radio selected Harmless Like You as a Great Read and noted that the novel was "highly anticipated". Ilana Masad wrote in the Los Angeles Review of Books that "there is no doubt about how good an artist she is, for this book demonstrates that she is an excellent one".

Buchanan's second novel, Starling Days, was published by Sceptre in 2019. It is about Mina and Oscar, newly-weds who have moved from New York to London in hopes that a change of scenery and new friends will help Mina recover from a major depressive episode. The novel was selected by The Paris Review as a "Staff Pick" for being "an exquisite rendering of love, sadness, and misunderstanding." Starling Days was positively reviewed by Eithne Farry in the Sunday Express, and The Spectator described it as "a convincing novel about depression which manages, miraculously, not to be in itself depressing." In The Guardian, Molly McCloskey criticized the novel's writing, particularly its unconvincing use of a feminist viewpoint, while also noting that Starling Days contained "indications that Buchanan is a better writer than this work would suggest" and concluding that the book "offers consolation" to readers. The book was shortlisted for the 2019 Costa Book Award for Novel.

In 2022, Sceptre acquired the rights to publish Buchanan's third novel, titled The Sleepwatcher, which tells a story about adolescence and family from the perspective of a 16-year-old girl who is able to move around undetected while her body remains in bed.

In 2026, Buchanan published a novella with the Eden Book Society, a literary hoax created by Dead Ink Books, alongside authors Grady Hendrix, John Darnielle, Nina Allan, Alison Rumfitt and Chịkọdịlị Emelụmadụ. The six novellas were published pseudonymously, leaving readers to guess which author wrote which.

=== Other work ===
Buchanan is the editor of Go Home!, a 2018 anthology from Feminist Press in collaboration with Asian American Writers' Workshop that collects stories from Asian-American writers who "complicate and expand the idea of home". She has also published fiction in literary magazines such as Granta, Tin House, and TriQuarterly. Her non-fiction and essays have appeared in The Guardian, The Atlantic, Guernica, The Paris Review, and The Rumpus, among other publications.

Buchanan was a 2016 Margins Fellow at the Asian American Writers' Workshop and a 2018 Kundiman Fellow.

== Personal life ==
Buchanan identifies as a Japanese-British-Chinese-American, and has said "I’ve always had my hyphens, so it's hard for me to imagine how I'd write if I was only one thing." She lives and writes in the U.K. Buchanan has a daughter with her partner.

== Works ==
=== UK editions ===
- —— (2016). Harmless Like You (1st UK ed.). Sceptre. ISBN 9781473638327.
- —— (2019). Starling Days (1st UK ed.). Sceptre. ISBN 9781473638372.
- The Sleep Watcher (2023)

=== US editions ===
- —— (2017). Harmless Like You (1st US ed.). W. W. Norton & Co. ISBN 9781324000747.

=== As editor ===
- Go Home! (Feminist Press, 2018) ISBN 9781936932016
- Dog Hearted: Essays on Our Fierce and Familiar Companions (2023), edited with Jessica J. Lee

=== Select short stories ===
- "Rebuke the Wind" in Apogee Journal Issue 06 (2015)
- "Three" in Extra Teeth - Issue Two (2020), edited by Heather Parry and Jules Danskin
- "Before It Disappears" in How Much the Heart Can Hold: Seven Stories on Love (2016)
- "No One is Lonely" Who's Loving You: Love Stories by Women of Colour (2021), edited by Sareeta Domingo

=== Select essays ===
- "All You Have to do is Die" in Writing the Uncanny (2021), edited by Dan Coxon and Richard V. Hurst
- "Wilder Flowers" in This Book is a Plant: How to Grow, Learn and Radically Engage with the Natural World (2022)
