= Valerie Brandes =

British book publisher

- Born: London, England
- Education: University of Exeter; University of California Santa Cruz
- Occupation: Publisher
- Known for: Founder and CEO of Jacaranda Books

Valerie Brandes is a British publisher who is the founder and CEO of Jacaranda Books, a diversity-led publishing house established in 2012.

She was born in Stoke Newington, London, England, second youngest of her parents' children. Growing up with an interest in books and reading, she went on to study American and Commonwealth Arts at the University of Exeter. Her undergraduate course included a year of international study and she took a place at University of California, Santa Cruz, remaining in San Diego for the following two decades (having on the first day of school met her husband, with whom she would have two children). During this period, she worked at booksellers Barnes and Noble, and joined the Writer's Guild writing collective.

Eventually returning to live in London with her family, Brandes in 2008 she took a master's degree in Publishing Studies at City, University of London, and on graduating worked as office manager for Profile Books, before setting up diversity-led publishing company Jacaranda Books in 2012. which aims to provide a space for writing "as cosmopolitan as our city".

Brandes was listed consecutively in the Powerlist 2018 and Powerlist 2019 as one of the 100 most influential black Britons. In June 2021, she was an invited speaker at the online London Book Fair.
