= Jacaranda Books =

British publisher

- Founded: December 2011; 14 years ago
- Founder: Valerie Brandes
- Country of origin: United Kingdom
- Headquarters location: London
- Distribution: Hachette Book Group (UK); Baker & Taylor (USA, Canada, Europe, Asia & Middle East)
- Key people: Jazzmine Breary, Magdalene Abraha
- No. of employees: 7
- Official website: jacarandabooks.co.uk

Jacaranda Books is a Black-owned British independent book publishing firm launched in 2012 and known for their effort promoting diversity in United Kingdom's publishing industry.

== History ==
Jacaranda Books was founded in December 2011 in London by Valerie Brandes after she left Profile Books, with the purpose of promoting inclusivity and diversity in publishing and continuing the legacy of pioneers of diverse publishing such as John La Rose, Margaret Busby, Jessica Huntley and Verna Wilkins.

At the time of foundation, according to professor Claire Squires (Professor of Publishing Studies, and Director of the Stirling Centre for International Publishing and Communication at the University of Stirling), the English-language publishing industry in United Kingdom had a homogenised white, middle-class and Oxbridge-dominated workforce. This was reflected in the content published in the industry as a whole, which mirrored the situation.

Jacaranda Books' strategy was to address the lack of diversity and the culture of risk aversion in the industry by publishing worldwide renowned titles (such as 2017's Rest in Power: The Enduring Life of Trayvon Martin) and award-winning authors (including Bernice McFadden, Fiston Mwanza Mujila, Anietie Isong and Irenosen Okojie), some of whom were previously unpublished in the UK.

Six years later, across 90 per cent of the book publishing industry in the UK the situation remained the same. In 2018, Jacaranda partnered with the creative communications agency Words Of Colour to call for submissions for TwentyIn2020 and publish 20 black British writers in the year 2020, which would be a first in publishing history. Later in 2018 11.6 per cent of the workforce in publishing was identified as BAME, reaching 13.0 per cent by 2019.

To mark the company's 20th anniversary in 2022, Jacaranda announced 10 exclusive editions of its most popular and prizewinning titles, by authors including Anietie Isong, Irenosen Okojie, Radhika Jha, Anthony Anaxagorou.

Among other notable titles, in 2024 Jacaranda published a new edition of Sam Greenlee's classic novel The Spook Who Sat by the Door to mark its 55th anniversary, with a new introduction by the original publisher, Margaret Busby, and an afterword by the author's daughter Natiki Hope Pressley.

== Advisory board ==
In 2023, Jacaranda introduced an advisory board – a measure recommended to Arts Council England's National Portfolio Organisations – appointing as members Dorothy Koomson, Richard Adeshiyan, Lina Liederman, Isabelle Dupuy and Solomon Rose.

== Initiatives ==
=== #TwentyIn2020 ===
In February 2018, Jacaranda Books released a call for submissions for Twenty In 2020, which started a chain reaction on the industry: Hachette launched Dialogue Books headed by Sharmaine Lovegrove in May 2018 (publicly inspired by Jacaranda Books, and signing Irenosen Okojie), Penguin Random House launched #Merky Books headed by Stormzy in October 2018, and HarperCollins appointed Nancy Adimora to a new diversity area in February 2020.

A year after the call for submissions, the national press made echo of the campaign, and historical partnerships were begun with the London Library and other partners such as Foyles.

As of 2020, Jacaranda's TwentyIn2020 remains the biggest collection of black authors published in the same year, an effort that was recognised in July 2020 when Jacaranda was awarded the title of "Small Press of the Year" at The Bookseller's British Book Awards.

=== #AQuickTingOn ===
In September 2019, Jacaranda announced another campaign A Quick Ting On, a new non-fiction series focused on the black British community, all written by young black British writers. A similar series was later announced by #Merky Books including Anthony Anaxagorou, an author previously published by Jacaranda Books.

=== #InclusiveIndies and the #BlackLivesMatter movement ===
In July 2013, Black Lives Matter movement began on social media after the Trayvon Martin case. The book Rest in Power: The Enduring Life of Trayvon Martin (2017), narrating the facts that began the movement, was published by Penguin Books in United States, but not in United Kingdom, where it is published by Jacaranda as part of their stand for diversity.

In June 2020, Jacaranda in partnership with Knights Of collected £160k in the crowdfunding campaign #InclusiveIndies. This was an appeal to try to assure their survival in the face of the COVID-19 pandemic. The appeal won extra traction through the BlackLivesMatter movement of 2020.

After the campaign, the founder of Jacaranda was interviewed in 5 News by Claudia-Liza Armah on "Why diverse literature is important for society to tackle racism".

== Impact on the industry and culture ==
In 2013, staff member Jazzmine Breary contributed to the report Writing The Future: Black and Asian Authors Publishers in the Market Place. In 2018, she participated on the jury at the Young British Muslim Writers Awards. As sales, publicity and marketing manager, she was named one of The Bookseller's rising stars in 2020.

Jacaranda's founder, Valerie Brandes, was listed consecutively in the Powerlist 2018 and Powerlist 2019 as one of the 100 most influential black Britons, a list shared with such other personalities as Meghan, Duchess of Sussex.

In 2019, staff member Magdalene Abraha left Bloomsbury Publishing to join Jacaranda, and the same year she was named among The Bookseller's rising stars.

In 2021, so as to expand Jacaranda's sales and distribution, the company joined forces with Hachette UK.
