= Grace Jones Morgan =

American novelist

Grace Jones Morgan (November 26, 1884 – January 1, 1977) was a Canadian-born pulp fiction writer and novelist. She often used the pseudonym Bassett Morgan.

== Early life ==
The daughter of Edwin Bassett Jones and Emily Dunkley, she was born Grace Ethel Jones in Chatham, Kent County, Ontario. In 1905, she married Thomas Russell Morgan. The family moved to California in 1918.

== Career ==
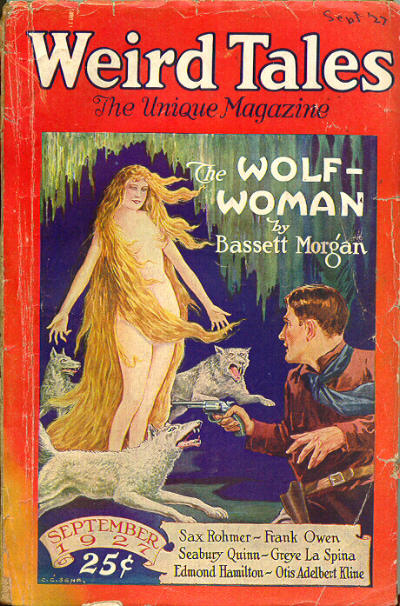
Morgan's novelette "The Wolf-Woman" was the cover story in the September 1927 Weird Tales

Morgan wrote for a number of pulp fiction magazines such as Weird Tales, Argosy, Oriental Stories and Ghost Stories. Her stories were also included in a number of anthologies. She published at least three novels: Salvage All (1928), Tents of Shem (1930) and The Golden Rupee (1935), and self-published her father's autobiography Recollections of Edwin Bassett Jones.

== Death ==
She died in Alameda at the age of 92.
