= Nudibranch (book) =

2019 anthology by Irenosen Okojie

- First edition
- Author: Irenosen Okojie
- Language: English
- Genre: Fiction
- Publisher: Dialogue Books
- Publication date: 2019
- Publication place: Nigeria
- Media type: Print (Paperback)
- Pages: 272

Nudibranch is a 2019 collection of short stories written by the Nigerian author Irenosen Okojie. It was her third book and second collection. It was published by Little, Brown UK via their Dialogue Books imprint in 2019.

== Reception ==
The Times Literary Supplement describe her voice as "singular and admirably uncompromising". Zoë Apostolides writing for Financial Times reviewed that the collection was "...poignant, performative and disturbing." Chris Power of The Guardian called it "An extraordinary collection of surreal tales takes in time travel, molluscs and monks."
