= Alex Christofi =

British author

Alex Christofi is a British author and book editor.

== Early life ==
Christofi was born in Dorset to a British mother and a Greek Cypriot father, and grew up in Bournemouth. He was educated at Bournemouth School, where his father was a teacher.

He earned a degree in English from Lady Margaret Hall, Oxford.

== Career ==
Before publishing his first novel, Christofi worked as a literary agent for over five years. In 2015, he published his debut novel Glass. It tells the story of Gunter Glass, a 22-year-old, half-German window cleaner. For Glass, he won the 2016 Betty Trask Prize. In 2017, he published his second novel, Let Us Be True, about a German-born couple falling in love in post-war France. His biography Dostoevsky in Love: An Intimate Life was shortlisted for the Slightly Foxed Best First Biography Prize.

In 2015, Christofi was appointed commissioning editor for non-fiction at Oneworld, previously working for Conville and Walsh. In February 2020, it was announced he would be leaving Oneworld to join Transworld Publishers's non-fiction team as an editorial director in April of that year.

== "Book Murderer" Viral Controversy ==
In early 2020, Christofi tweeted a photograph of several books cut in half, saying he cuts "long books in half to make them more portable." The tweet subsequently went viral, becoming the subject of several news stories and caused a large amount of conversation on Twitter. He later wrote an editorial for The Guardian entitled "I am the 'book murderer', but I tear them apart out of love."

== Personal life ==
Christofi currently lives in London.

== Published works ==
- Glass (2015)
- Let Us Be True (2017)
- Dostoevsky in Love (2021)
- Cypria (2024)
