= Wolfreton School =

Community school in Willerby, East Riding of Yorkshire, England

Location
- Well Lane; Willerby, East Riding of Yorkshire, HU10 6HB; England; 53°44′53″N 00°26′46″W

Information
- Type: Academy
- Motto: Haulte Emprise
- Established: 12 May 1960
- Local authority: East Riding
- Department for Education URN: 144561 Tables
- Ofsted: Reports
- Head teacher: Susanne Kukuc
- Gender: Coeducational
- Age: 11 to 18
- Enrolment: 1700
- Houses: Nightingale, Owen, Rowntree, Tomlinson, Wilberforce
- Website: http://www.wolfreton.co.uk/

Wolfreton School & Sixth Form College is a coeducational secondary school and sixth form located in Willerby, East Riding of Yorkshire, England.

During Ofsted's school inspection in October 2021, Wolfreton School and Sixth Form received "Good" ratings in all inspect sections.

== History ==
The school was split over two sites, the Lower School in Willerby and the Upper School in Kirk Ella. In 2014, it was announced that both sites were to be demolished and a new multi-million pound site would be built on the playing field of the Lower School. The new school opened in September 2016.

== Houses ==
All students and staff are assigned to one of five houses: Nightingale, Owen, Rowntree, Tomlinson, Wilberforce

The names of the houses are made up of recognised individuals who reflect the Wolfreton School values: Excellence, Endeavour, Respect.

== The Consortium Trust ==
Wolfreton School & Sixth Form College is part of The Consortium Trust along with Hessle High School and Cottingham High School. Founded in 2017, the Trust provides a support network for local schools and Sixth Form colleges.

== Rushanje School, Uganda ==
Wolfreton School staff travel over to help develop Rushanje School in Mbarara, Uganda, and form The Wolfreton Rushanje Community Partnership. A new Science and Humanities block built at Wolfreton's Upper School site was named 'Rushanje House' in honour of the relationship.

== Notable alumni ==
- Caroline Bilton — BBC Look North presenter and reporter
- Josh Bowden — Professional rugby player
- Robert Crampton — Journalist for The Times
- Abbie Eaton — Racing driver working on The Grand Tour
- Chris Green — Professional rugby player
- Sara Jafari - Novelist and editor
- Annabelle Lewis — Sprinter, won bronze for Great Britain in Women's 4x100 relay at the 2013 World Championships
- Jordan Metcalfe — Actor, known for The Queen's Nose and Genie in the House
- Garreth Roberts — Hull City footballer and captain. One of the club's longest serving players from 1978–1992
- Tracey Seaward — Award-winning film producer known for The Queen, The Two Popes, and producer of the 2012 London Olympics opening ceremony
