= Anietie Isong =

Nigerian poet and short story writer

Anietie Isong is a Nigerian/British author of poetry and short stories.

== Biography ==
Dr. Anietie Isong holds a PhD in New Media and Writing from De Montfort University, Leicester. He is also a graduate of the University of Ibadan and the University of Leicester where he studied communication. Dr. Isong started his career in broadcasting before switching to public relations. His earlier work writing scripts for radio evolved into a more dedicated focus on writing. Among his poems and short stories, he won the MUSON Poetry Award for "These Many Rivers" and the Commonwealth Short Story Award for "Diary of an ECOMOG Soldier". He subsequently sponsored a special prize in the Commonwealth Short Story competition for "best Nigerian story" in 2010. He also won the Olaudah Equiano Prize for Fiction and the Remember Oluwale Writing Prize.

Isong has worked as a speechwriter, public relations manager and researcher in Europe, Middle East and Africa. His elder sister, Emem Isong, is a well-known producer and screenplay writer for Nollywood films.

Dr. Isong's debut novel Radio Sunrise explores the issue of corruption in the journalism profession and has been described by as "a satirical portrait of Nigeria". Radio Sunrise won the McKitterick Prize 2018.
