= Catherine Manning =

British novelist

Catherine, Lady Manning
- Education: University of Oxford
- Occupation: novelist
- Spouse: Sir David Manning

Catherine, Lady Manning is a British writer, who has written five mystery novels under the pseudonym Elizabeth Ironside.

== Early life ==
Catherine Manning is the daughter of a general practitioner doctor, and grew up in a Northamptonshire village.

She was educated at University of Oxford, where she earned a bachelor's degree in history, followed by a PhD.

== Career ==
After university, Manning worked for some time as a teacher, before turning to writing.

As Elizabeth Ironside, she won the Crime Writers' Association Best First Novel Award for her 1985 novel, A Very Private Enterprise. She has also been runner-up for the Crime Writers' Association Golden Dagger. All of her five novels have been published in the UK and the US.

Interviewed by The Daily Telegraph in November 2004, Manning said that she had not been able to publish a new novel for a while because her husband, Sir David Manning, was the British ambassador to the United States, and acting as a hostess for their numerous functions had kept her very busy. She also expressed pleasant surprise, saying that she was "extremely flattered,"" when she found out that in a then recent interview with Time magazine, Laura Bush had said, "I'm having so much fun reading Lady Catherine Manning's mysteries."

== Selected publications ==
- A Very Private Enterprise (1984) Hodder & Stoughton Ltd ISBN 978-0340352694
- Death in the Garden (1995)
- The Accomplice (1996)
- The Art of Deception (1998) Hodder & Stoughton ISBN 978-0340716854
- A Good Death (2008) Hodder & Stoughton ISBN 978-0340716861

== Personal life ==
Manning is married to Sir David Manning, the former British ambassador to the United States. She met David when they were both history students at the University of Oxford, "I think we met at a lecture." After a few years, they found out that they were unable to have children.
