= Irenosen Okojie =

Nigerian writer

Irenosen Okojie MBE FRSL
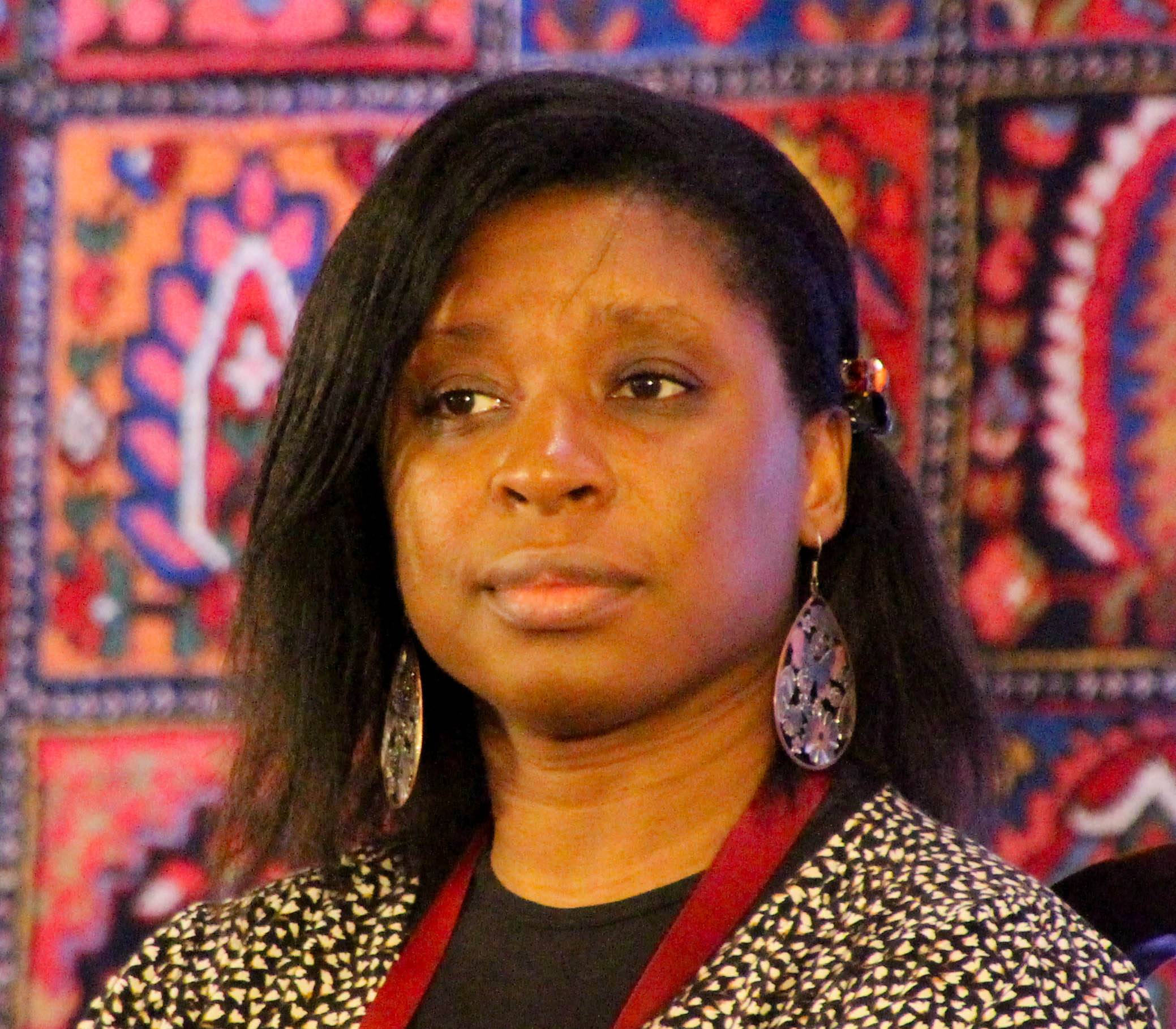
- Okojie at the 2025 Jaipur Literature Festival
- Born: Irenosen Iseghohi Okojie; Nigeria
- Education: London Metropolitan University
- Occupation: Writer
- Notable work: Butterfly Fish (2016); "Grace Jones" (2019)
- Awards: Betty Trask Award; Caine Prize for African Writing
- Website: irenosenokojie.com

Irenosen Iseghohi Okojie MBE FRSL is a Nigerian-born novelist and short-story writer working in London, England. Her stories incorporate speculative elements and also make use of her West African heritage. Her first novel, Butterfly Fish, won a Betty Trask Award in 2016, and her story "Grace Jones" won the 2020 Caine Prize for African Writing. Okojie was elected as a Fellow of the Royal Society of Literature (RSL) in 2018, and in 2020 was appointed a vice-chair of the RSL.

== Biography ==
=== Early years and education ===
Irenosen Okojie was born in Nigeria, West Africa. When she was eight years old, her family moved to the United Kingdom. She attended Gresham's, a boarding school in Holt, Norfolk, before going on to St Angela's Convent School in East London and then to Stamford Boarding School for girls. Okojie returned to London to complete her education, attending London Metropolitan University, where she studied Communications and Visual Culture.

=== Career ===
Okojie is an arts project manager and curator based in London. Her debut novel, Butterfly Fish, won a Betty Trask Award in 2016. Her writing has been published in The New York Times, The Observer, The Guardian, the BBC and the Huffington Post, and she is a contributor to the 2019 anthology New Daughters of Africa, edited by Margaret Busby.

Okojie has received nominations for a number of awards and she has been a judge for other literary competitions. Her 2016 collection of short stories, Speak Gigantular, was shortlisted for the 2016 inaugural Jhalak Prize as well as the 2017 Edge Hill Short Story Prize. Her story "Animal Parts" was nominated for a 2016 Shirley Jackson Award, and her short story "Synsepalum" was broadcast on BBC Radio 4 to celebrate the BBC National Short Story Award 2018.

Also in 2018, Okojie was elected as a Fellow of the Royal Society of Literature. On 19 May 2020, she was shortlisted for the Caine Prize for African Writing, and was announced as the winner on 27 July 2020 for her story "Grace Jones".

Okojie was appointed Member of the Order of the British Empire (MBE) in the 2021 Birthday Honours for services to literature.

In 2023, Okojie was one of the judges of the Women's Prize for Fiction.

She is the director and founder of futuristic festival Black to the Future, a multidisciplinary festival celebrating Black artists.

== Honours and awards ==
- 2016: Betty Trask Award (for Butterfly Fish)
- 2018: Elected a Fellow of the Royal Society of Literature
- 2020: Winner of AKO Caine Prize for African Writing (with "Grace Jones")

== Bibliography ==
- Speak Gigantular (short stories), London: Jacaranda Books, 2016
- Butterfly Fish (novel), London: Jacaranda Books, 2016
- Nudibranch (short stories), London: Hachette, 2019
- Curandera (novel), London: Dialogue Books, 2024
