= Rest in Power: The Enduring Life of Trayvon Martin =

2017 non-fiction book

- First edition
- Author: Sybrina Fulton, Tracy Martin
- Language: English
- Subject: Race relations, gun violence
- Publisher: Spiegel & Grau
- Publication date: January 31, 2017
- Publication place: United States
- Pages: 368
- ISBN: 978-0-8129-9723-1

Rest in Power: The Enduring Life of Trayvon Martin is a non-fiction book written by Sybrina Fulton and Tracy Martin, the parents of Trayvon Martin, a teenager whose death by shooting drew nationwide protests against racial violence.

== Summary ==
Rest in Power was written nearly five years after the killing of Trayvon Martin. Sybrina Fulton, Trayvon Martin's mother, says the book is intended as a means to heal, to share with the world the Trayvon Martin his parents knew and loved, and to describe the impact Martin's death and surrounding events had on their lives.

The book is introduced by Fulton who states "no one gets over the death of a child." She describes how prior to the incident, she felt she was just another "anonymous" American who goes through life in a predictable rhythm of work, school, church and picnics. But after the death of Trayvon, she became an activist working to prevent other senseless gun violence. But this activism "failed to prevent the death of Jordan Davis (Jacksonville, Florida), Michael Brown (Ferguson, Missouri), Tamir Rice (Cleveland, Ohio), Eric Garner (New York City) as well as countless others".

Fulton goes on to discuss her son Trayvon and how before he became a "martyr" and "symbol of racial injustice", he was simply a boy growing up trying to find his way in life. She reflects on her own life growing up, meeting and marrying Tracy Martin, and raising Trayvon together.

The rest of the book alternates between Fulton and Tracy Martin as they discuss being forced out of their lives as ordinary Americans and into the spotlight because of death of their son and the events that followed.

== Publisher ==
The book was published by Spiegel & Grau (an imprint of Penguin Random House) in US on 31 January 2017, and by Jacaranda Books in UK on 1st February 2017.

== Reception ==
Rest in Power was widely and favorably reviewed. In USA Today it received three and a half of four stars; in The Washington Post, Wesley Lowery called it "a beautiful, searing account of their experience...an intimate portrait of their slain son and a detail-rich chronicle of the year from his death to his killer’s acquittal."

== See also ==
- Mothers of the Movement
