= Costa Book Award for First Novel =

Annual literary award for debut novels

The Costa Book Award for First Novel, formerly known as the Whitbread Award (1971–2006), was an annual literary award for authors' debut novels, part of the Costa Book Awards which were discontinued in 2022, the 2021 awards being the last made.

== Recipients ==
Costa Books of the Year are distinguished with a blue ribbon.

=== 1900s ===
Costa Book Award for First Novel winners and finalists, 1974–1999
Year	Author	Title		Ref.
1974	Claire Tomalin	The Life and Death of Mary Wollstonecraft	Winner	
1975	Ruth Spalding	The Improbable Puritan: A Life of Bulstrode Whitelocke	Winner	
No award presented 1976-1980				
1981	William Boyd	A Good Man in Africa	Winner	
1982	Bruce Chatwin	On the Black Hill	Winner	
1983	John Fuller	Flying to Nowhere	Winner	
1984	James Buchan	A Parish of Rich Women	Winner	
1985	Jeanette Winterson	Oranges Are Not the Only Fruit	Winner	
1986	Jim Crace	Continent	Winner	
1987	Francis Wyndham	The Other Garden	Winner	
1988	Paul Sayer	The Comforts of Madness	Winner	
1989	James Hamilton-Paterson	Gerontius	Winner	
1990	Hanif Kureishi	The Buddha of Suburbia	Winner	
1991	Gordon Burn	Alma Cogan	Winner	
1992	Jeff Torrington	Swing Hammer Swing!	Winner	
1993	Rachel Cusk	Saving Agnes	Winner	
1994	Fred D'Aguiar	The Longest Memory	Winner	
1995	Kate Atkinson	Behind the Scenes at the Museum	Winner	
1995	Stephen Blanchard	Gagarin & I	Shortlist	
1995	Alan Warner	Morvern Callar	Shortlist	
1996	John Lanchester	The Debt to Pleasure	Winner	
1996	Seamus Deane	Reading In the Dark	Shortlist	
1996	Georgina Hammick	The Arizona Game	Shortlist	
1996	Mary Morrissy	Mother of Pearl	Shortlist	
1997	Pauline Melville	The Ventriloquist's Tale	Winner	
1997	Anne Haverty	One Day as a Tiger	Shortlist	
1997	Mick Jackson	The Underground Man	Shortlist	
1997	Ardashir Vakil	Beach Boy	Shortlist	
1997	Phil Whitaker	Eclipse of the Sun	Shortlist	
1998	Giles Foden	The Last King of Scotland	Winner	
1998	Gavin Kramer	Shopping	Shortlist	
1998	Magnus Mills	The Restraint of Beasts	Shortlist	
1998	Luke Sutherland	Jelly Roll	Shortlist	
1999	Tim Lott	White City Blue	Winner	
1999	Suzanne Cleminshaw	The Great Ideas	Shortlist	
1999	Andrew O'Hagan	Our Fathers	Shortlist	
1999	Francine Stock	A Foreign Country	Shortlist	

=== 2000s ===
Costa Book Award for First Novel winners and shortlists, 2000–2021
Year	Author	Title	Result	Ref.
2000	Zadie Smith	White Teeth	Winner	
2000	Michel Faber	Under the Skin	Shortlist	
2000	Jo-Ann Goodwin	Danny Boy	Shortlist	
2000	Laura Hird	Born Free	Shortlist	
2001	Sid Smith	Something Like a House	Winner	
2001	Will Eaves	The Oversight	Shortlist	
2001	Carl Tighe	Burning Worm	Shortlist	
2001	Gerard Woodward	August	Shortlist	
2002	Norman Lebrecht	The Song of Names	Winner	
2002	Neil Astley	The End of My Tether	Shortlist	
2002	Tariq Goddard	Homage to a Firing Squad	Shortlist	
2002	Hari Kunzru	The Impressionist	Shortlist	
2003	DBC Pierre	Vernon God Little	Winner	
2003	Anne Donovan	Buddha Da	Shortlist	
2003	Paul Murray	An Evening of Long Goodbyes	Shortlist	
2003	Talitha Stevenson	An Empty Room	Shortlist	
2004	Susan Fletcher	Eve Green	Winner	
2004	Susanna Clarke	Jonathan Strange & Mr Norrell	Shortlist	
2004	Richard Collins	The Land as Viewed from the Sea	Shortlist	
2004	Susan Fletcher	Eve Green	Shortlist	
2004	Panos Karnezis	The Maze	Shortlist	
2005	Tash Aw	The Harmony Silk Factory	Winner	
2005	Diana Evans	26a	Shortlist	
2005	Peter Hobbs	The Short Day Dying	Shortlist	
2005	Rachel Zadok	Gem Squash Tokoloshe	Shortlist	
2006	Stef Penney	The Tenderness of Wolves	Winner	
2006	Michael Cox	The Meaning of Night	Shortlist	
2006	Marilyn Heward Mills	Cloth Girl	Shortlist	
2006	James Scudamore	The Amnesia Clinic	Shortlist	
2007	Catherine O'Flynn	What Was Lost	Winner	
2007	Tahmima Anam	A Golden Age	Shortlist	
2007	Nikita Lalwani	Gifted	Shortlist	
2007	Roma Tearne	Mosquito	Shortlist	
2008	Sadie Jones	The Outcast	Winner	
2008	Poppy Adams	The Behaviour of Moths	Shortlist	
2008	Tom Rob Smith	Child 44	Shortlist	
2008	Jennie Rooney	Inside the Whale	Shortlist	
2009	Raphael Selbourne	Beauty	Winner	
2009	Rachel Heath	The Finest Type of English Womanhood	Shortlist	
2009	Peter Murphy	John the Revelator	Shortlist	
2009	Ali Shaw	The Girl with Glass Feet	Shortlist	
2010	Kishwar Desai	Witness the Night	Winner	
2010	Nikesh Shukla	Coconut Unlimited	Shortlist	
2010	Aatish Taseer	The Temple-Goers	Shortlist	
2010	Simon Thirsk	Not Quite White	Shortlist	
2011	Christie Watson	Tiny Sunbirds Far Away	Winner	
2011	Kevin Barry	City of Bohane	Shortlist	
2011	Patrick McGuinness	The Last Hundred Days	Shortlist	
2011	Kerry Young	Pao	Shortlist	
2012	Francesca Segal	The Innocents	Winner	
2012	J. W. Ironmonger	The Notable Brain of Maximilian Ponder	Shortlist	
2012	Jess Richards	Snake Ropes	Shortlist	
2012	Benjamin Wood	The Bellwether Revivals	Shortlist	
2013	Nathan Filer	The Shock of the Fall	Winner	
2013	Sam Byers	Idiopathy	Shortlist	
2013	Kate Clanchy	Meeting the English	Shortlist	
2013	Sathnam Sanghera	Marriage Material	Shortlist	
2014	Emma Healey	Elizabeth is Missing	Winner	
2014	Carys Bray	A Song for Issy Bradley	Shortlist	
2014	Mary Costello	Academy Street	Shortlist	
2014	Simon Wroe	Chop Chop	Shortlist	
2015	Andrew Michael Hurley	The Loney	Winner	
2015	Sara Baume	Spill Simmer Falter Wither	Shortlist	
2015	Kate Hamer	The Girl in the Red Coat	Shortlist	
2015	Tasha Kavanagh	Things We Have in Common	Shortlist	
2016	Francis Spufford	Golden Hill	Winner	
2016	Maggie O'Farrell	This Must Be the Place	Shortlist	
2016	Sarah Perry	The Essex Serpent	Shortlist	
2016	Guinevere Glasfurd	The Words in My Hand	Shortlist	
2017	Gail Honeyman	Eleanor Oliphant Is Completely Fine	Winner	
2017	Xan Brooks	The Clocks in This House All Tell Different Times	Shortlist	
2017	Karl Geary	Montpelier Parade	Shortlist	
2017	Rebecca F. John	The Haunting of Henry Twist	Shortlist	
2018	Stuart Turton	The Seven Deaths of Evelyn Hardcastle	Winner	
2018	Natalie Hart	Pieces of Me	Shortlist	
2018	Elisa Lodato	An Unremarkable Body	Shortlist	
2018	Anne Youngson	Meet Me at the Museum	Shortlist	
2019	Sara Collins	The Confessions of Frannie Langton	Winner	
2019	Brian Bilston	Diary of a Somebody	Shortlist	
2019	Candice Carty-Williams	Queenie	Shortlist	
2019	Joanna Glen	The Other Half of Augusta Hope	Shortlist	
2020	Ingrid Persaud	Love After Love	Winner	
2020	Michelle Gallen	Big Girl, Small Town	Shortlist	
2020	Sairish Hussain	The Family Tree	Shortlist	
2020	Karen Raney	All the Water in the World	Shortlist	
2021	Caleb Azumah Nelson	Open Water	Winner	
2021	A. K. Blakemore	The Manningtree Witches	Shortlist	
2021	Emily Itami	Fault Lines	Shortlist	
2021	Kate Sawyer	The Stranding	Shortlist	
