= Daisy Bevan =

British actress

- Education: Bedales School; Lee Strasberg Theatre and Film Institute
- Occupation: Actress
- Years active: 1998–present
- Parent(s): Tim Bevan; Joely Richardson

Daisy Bevan (born c. 1993) is a British actress. She is the daughter of actress Joely Richardson and film producer Tim Bevan.

== Acting ==
Bevan made her screen debut in 1998 in the film Elizabeth (produced by her father's company, Working Title) at the age of five. She and her mother played daughter and mother Madame Royal and Marie Antoinette in the 2001 film, The Affair of the Necklace. In 2014, she played a supporting role in the adaptation of the Patricia Highsmith novel The Two Faces of January, and starred in a stage adaptation of Oscar Wilde's The Picture of Dorian Gray at the Riverside Studios in London.

In July 2015, Bevan played the role of Tamsin Carmichael in the BBC's two-part television adaptation of Sadie Jones’ debut novel The Outcast. In 2018, she starred in 5 episodes of the The Alienist.

In June 2022, Bevan made a guest appearance in an episode of ITV's McDonald & Dodds titled "A Billion Beats". In 2025, she appeared in Too Much.

== Education ==
Bevan attended Bedales School in Hampshire, and then the Lee Strasberg Theatre and Film Institute in Manhattan. Her parents forbade her from pursuing an acting career until she graduated.

== Illness ==
At the age of one, Bevan was diagnosed with a rare circulatory condition that affected her legs. At age 15, she had to undergo a series of operations, causing her mother to suspend her role on the TV series Nip/Tuck for a year.

== Family ==
Bevan is a member of the Redgrave acting family, marking the fifth generation of her family to enter the profession. As the daughter of Joely Richardson, she is also the niece of Natasha Richardson and granddaughter of Vanessa Redgrave. Her parents divorced when she was nine. She has two half-siblings from her father's second marriage. As of 2014, she was living with her mother in London.

== Pledge ==
In September 2025, she signed an open pledge with Film Workers for Palestine pledging not to work with Israeli film institutions "that are implicated in genocide and apartheid against the Palestinian people."
