= Greg Wise =

English actor and producer (born 1966)

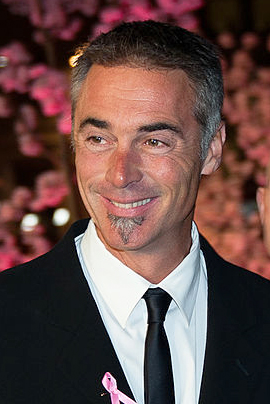
- Wise at the London Film Festival premiere of Saving Mr. Banks, October 2013
- Born: Matthew Gregory Wise; 15 May 1966 (age 60); Newcastle upon Tyne, Northumberland, England
- Education: Heriot-Watt University; Royal Scottish Academy of Music and Drama
- Occupations: Actor, producer
- Years active: 1992–present
- Spouse: Emma Thompson (m. 2003)
- Children: 2

Matthew Gregory Wise (born 15 May 1966) is an English actor and producer. He has appeared in several British television programmes and feature films. He played the role of John Willoughby in Sense and Sensibility, which also starred Emma Thompson, whom he later married.

== Early life and education ==
Wise was born on 15 May 1966 in Newcastle upon Tyne to architect parents Douglass Wise and Yvonne Jeannine Czeiler. He was educated at the independent St Peter's School, York. He went to Heriot-Watt University in Edinburgh to study architecture and performed at Bedlam Theatre. Wise studied drama at the Royal Scottish Academy of Music and Drama.

== Career ==
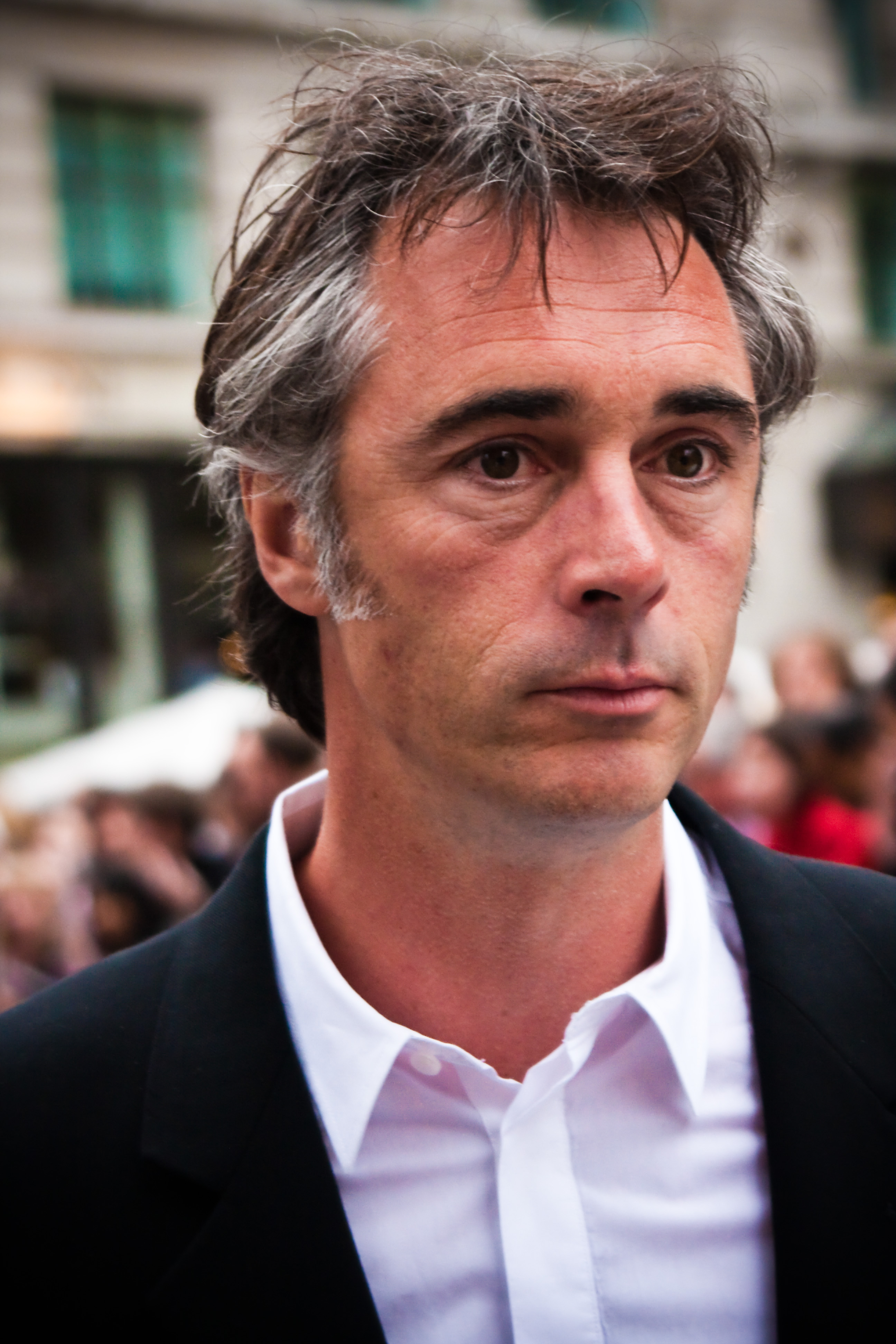
Wise, 2009

His first professional job was on stage, starring in Good Rockin' Tonight, a musical based on TV producer Jack Good's life.

His television work includes four BBC period dramas: The Moonstone with Keeley Hawes, The Buccaneers alongside Carla Gugino, Madame Bovary with Frances O'Connor, The Riff Raff Element in 1992 and 1993, and as Sir Charles Maulver in the 2007 five-part series Cranford. In 1999 he starred as Marshall in ITV's seven-part drama Wonderful You alongside his future mother-in-law Phyllida Law and future brother-in-law Richard Lumsden. He filmed a number of readings of love scenes from a selection of classic and modern love scenes, from Thomas Hardy's Tess of the d'Urbervilles to Kiran Desai's The Inheritance of Loss for The Carte Noire Readers. In 2011, he appeared in Hallmark Channel's Honeymoon for One, starring Nicollette Sheridan.

He is also the producer of the 2010 BBC/Masterpiece production The Song of Lunch starring his wife, actress Emma Thompson, and Alan Rickman.

In February 2015, Wise made his theatrical return starring in Brad Fraser's Kill Me Now at the Park Theatre in Finsbury Park, London. In July 2015, he played the role of emotionally distanced father Gilbert Aldridge in the BBC's two-part television adaptation of Sadie Jones' debut novel The Outcast. Wise portrayed Lord Louis Mountbatten in series 1 and 2 (2016/17) of Netflix's The Crown.

Wise won the celebrity version of The Great British Bake Off in aid of Stand Up to Cancer in 2019.

In 2021, Wise was a contestant on nineteenth series of Strictly Come Dancing. He was partnered with Karen Hauer and the couple were eliminated in the fourth week.

== Personal life ==
Wise has been in a relationship with actress Emma Thompson since 1995, when they met on the set of Sense and Sensibility. Their daughter Gaia was conceived through IVF and was born in 1999. They married in 2003, and that same year, they informally adopted Tindyebwa Agaba, a Rwandan orphan and former child soldier.

He is a Patron for End of Life Doula UK, a membership association for end of life doulas (also known as death doulas) in the UK, and believes that planning for end of life is an act of love.

Wise is a socialist.

== Filmography ==
=== Film ===
Title	Year	Role	Notes
Feast of July	1995	Arch Wilson	
Sense and Sensibility	1995	John Willoughby	
Judas Kiss	1998	Ben Dyson	
Africa	1999	Josh Sinclair	
Mad Cows	1999	Alex	
The Discovery of Heaven	2001	Max Delius	
Hills Like White Elephants	2002	The American	short
Johnny English	2003	Agent One	
Five Moons Plaza	2003	Francesco Doni	
Every Seven Years	2004	Boyfriend	short
The Adventures of Greyfriars Bobby	2005	Minister Lee	
A Cock and Bull Story	2005	Greg	
The Disappeared	2008	Jake Ryan	
Morris: A Life with Bells On	2009	Miloslav Villandry	
Effie Gray	2013	John Ruskin	
3 Days in Havana	2013	Harry Smith	
Walking on Sunshine	2014	Doug	
A Private War	2018	Professor David Irens	
Military Wives	2019	Richard	

=== Television ===
Title	Year	Role	Notes
A Masculine Ending	1992	Jamie Baird	TV film
Covington Cross	1992	Henry of Gault	Episode: Pilot
Typhon's People	1993	Cato Macgill / Adam Prime	TV film
The Riff Raff Element	1993	Alister	TV series
Taggart	1994	Greg Martin	Episode: Hellfire
Feast of July	1995	Arch Wilson	
The Buccaneers	1995	Guy Thwaite	TV mini-series
The Moonstone	1996	Franklin Blake	TV film
Tales from the Crypt	1996	Justin Amberson	Episode: Fatal Caper
The Place of the Dead	1997	Corporal Hugh Brittan	TV film
Hospital!	1997	Dr. Jim Nightingale	
House of Frankenstein	1997	Crispian Grimes	TV film
Alice Through the Looking Glass	1998	Red Knight	TV film
Wonderful You	1999	Marshall, chartered accountant	TV mini-series
Madame Bovary	2000	Rodolphe	TV film (episodes 2, 3)
Battersea to Bethlehem: A Christmas Story	2001	Narrator	
Sirens	2002	Oliver Rice	
Hornblower, Loyalty	2003	Major Côtard	TV film
According to Bex	2005	Charles Mathers	
Number 13	2006	Professor Anderson	BBC Ghost Stories for Christmas
Trial & Retribution Sins of the Father	2006	John Harrogate	TV film
Elizabeth David: A Life in Recipes	2006	Peter Higgins	TV film
Agatha Christie's Marple	2007	Nevile Strange	Episode: Towards Zero
Place of Execution	2008	Philip Hawkin	TV film
Cranford	2009	Sir Charles Maulver	
The Song of Lunch	2010	Producer	TV film
Law & Order: UK	2011	Gavin Williams	Episode 32: Crush
Honeymoon for One	2011	Sean	TV film
Homefront	2012	Major Pete Bartham	
Unknown Heart	2014	Duncan Lancaster	
The Outcast	2015	Gilbert Aldridge	
Galavant	2016	Arnold Galavant	
The Crown	2016–2017	Louis, Earl Mountbatten of Burma	Main role (Seasons 1–2)
Modus	2017	Warren Schifford	
Strange Angel	2018	Alfred Miller	TV series
Strictly Come Dancing	2021	Contestant	Series 19
The Buccaneers	2025	Reede Robinson	Season 2

== See also ==
- List of British actors
