= Grendon =

Grendon, meaning Green Hill (Don) or Green Valley (Dene) in Old English, may refer to:

== Places ==
- Grendon, Northamptonshire, a small village in Northamptonshire, England
- Grendon, Atherstone, a civil parish in Warwickshire, England
- Grendon Underwood, a village and civil parish in Buckinghamshire, England
- HM Prison Grendon, a prison in Buckinghamshire, England
- New Grendon, a village in Warwickshire, England
- Old Grendon, a village in Warwickshire, England

== People ==
- Stephen Grendon, a pen name of August Derleth

=== Fictional ===
- Dr. E. Grendon, the final character in Michael Cox's The Meaning of Night

== Companies ==
- Thomas Grendon and Company, an Ironworks Foundry and Locomotive builder of Drogheda, Ireland

== Titles ==
- Viscount Hatton, of Grendon
