= Catherine O'Flynn =

British writer (born 1970)

- Born: 1970 (age 55–56)
- Occupation: Writer
- Spouse: Peter Fletcher
- Children: 2
- Writing career
- Notable awards: Costa Book Award for First Novel (2007)

Catherine O'Flynn (born 1970) is a British writer. She has published three novels for adults, and two for children as well as various articles and short stories. Her debut novel, What Was Lost, which won a number of book prizes including the prestigious first novel prize at the Costa Book Awards in 2008. The same year, she was also named Newcomer of the Year at the Galaxy British Book Awards. She went on to release the novel The News Where You Are in 2010 and Mr. Lynch's Holiday in 2013.

== Early life ==
Catherine O'Flynn was born in Birmingham, England in 1970. Her parents were Irish immigrants. She attended Manchester University where she studied economics and anthropology.

== Career ==
O'Flynn's first novel, What Was Lost, was published in January 2007, after being rejected by major publishers. This novel received critical acclaim as an examination of the often lacklustre and empty experience of modern life, contrasted with the energy and optimism of a young girl who went missing in the mid-1980s. What Was Lost was long listed for the 2007 Man Booker Prize for Fiction and the Orange Prize for Fiction, and shortlisted for the Guardian First Book Award. It won the Jelf Group First Novel Award at the Guildford Book Festival and the prestigious First Novel prize at the Costa Book Awards in January 2008. In April 2008, she was named Newcomer of the Year at the Galaxy British Book Awards.

Her second book, The News Where You Are was published on 1 July 2010 and launched the following day at Ikon Gallery in Birmingham. It features the tale of a disenchanted local TV news anchor, who becomes obsessed with the unheralded deaths that he is routinely required to report as part of his day job. One of the stories he follows up has a curious connection to his own life and his seemingly ageless predecessor. O'Flynn was praised for being in this novel the "mistress of compassion" and "the JG Ballard of Birmingham...finding poetry and meaning where others see merely boredom and dereliction".

Her third book, Mr. Lynch's Holiday, was published on 1 August 2013, and tells the story of an estranged father and son, both emigrants from their respective homelands, but for very different reasons. Meeting up in an unfinished (but largely abandoned) housing development in Spain, both are in search of a connection with themselves and each other. The novel garnered numerous favourable reviews for its "brilliant wit and warmth", its "rare love story between a father and a son" and its treatment of "the absurdities of the credit boom", "excelling in exploring the strangeness of being the outsider and the stories people tell themselves to survive".

In 2011 she contributed a short story "The Stickiness of Lime Trees" to an anthology supporting The Woodland Trust. The anthology - Why Willows Weep - has so far helped The Woodland Trust plant approximately 50,000 trees, and is to be re-released in paperback format in 2016.

== Personal life ==
Prior to the publication of What Was Lost, O'Flynn worked in a variety of jobs including deputy manager of a large record shop, post woman, web editor, teacher and mystery shopper. After spending some time in and around Barcelona, she now lives and works in Birmingham, England. She is married to Peter Fletcher, and they have two daughters.

== Major works ==
This is an incomplete list of her works. please help to complete it:

=== Adult novels ===
- What Was Lost. London, England: Tindal Street Press. 2007. ISBN 978-1906994259.
- The News Where You Are. 2010.
- Mr. Lynch's Holiday. 2013.

=== Children's novels ===
- Lori and Max. 2019.
- Lori and Max and the Book Thieves. 2020.

=== Anthology ===
- Roads Ahead. 2009. (Editor)

=== Articles ===
- "The Flawed Cartographer". Granta. 103: 16–19. Autumn 2008.
