= Iain Softley =

English film director and screenwriter (born 1956)

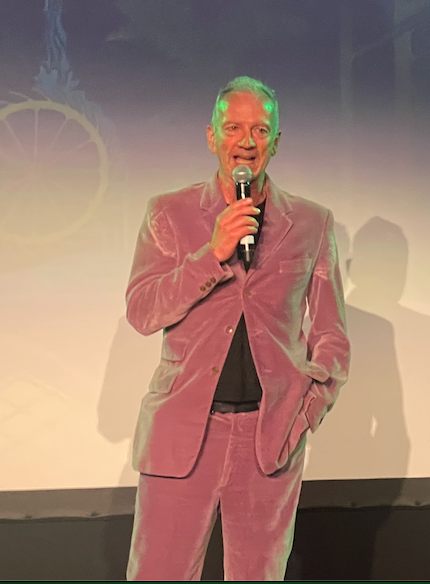
- Iain Softley introducing a screening of Hackers at Electromagnetic Field 2024.
- Born: 30 November 1956 (age 69); Chiswick, London, England, United Kingdom
- Occupations: Film director, producer, screenwriter
- Years active: 1994–present
- Spouse: Sarah Curtis
- Children: 3

Iain Declan Softley (born 30 November 1956) is an English film director, producer, and screenwriter. His films include Backbeat, Hackers, The Wings of the Dove, K-PAX, The Skeleton Key, Inkheart and the BBC adaptation of Sadie Jones's novel The Outcast.

== Career ==
Softley was educated at St Benedict's School, Ealing, London, and Queens' College, Cambridge, where he directed a number of highly-praised theatrical productions. He worked for Granada TV and the BBC in the 1980s before moving on to music videos and film.

Softley's first film, the Stuart Sutcliffe biopic, Backbeat, which he wrote and directed, was released in 1994. It opened the Sundance Film Festival and went on to receive a BAFTA Award nomination for Best British Film. For his work on the film, Softley received Best Newcomer Awards from The London Film Critics Circle and Empire Magazine.

Following Backbeat, Softley directed the cyber thriller Hackers, starring Angelina Jolie and Jonny Lee-Miller. This was followed in 1997 by an adaptation of Henry James' novel, The Wings of the Dove, starring Helena Bonham-Carter. The film premiered at the Toronto and Venice Film Festivals, earned four Academy Award nominations, and won a number of awards including two BAFTAs and multiple acting honors for Bonham Carter.

Softley's next two films (released by Universal Pictures) topped the US box office: the sci-fi mystery film K-PAX, starring Kevin Spacey, and Jeff Bridges, and the suspense thriller, The Skeleton Key with Kate Hudson, Gena Rowlands and John Hurt.

Other film credits include: Inkheart, from Cornelia Funke's best-selling book, with Brendan Fraser, Helen Mirren, Paul Bettany and Jim Broadbent; Trap for Cinderella, starring Tuppence Middleton and Alexandra Roach, which Softley adapted and directed from Sebastien Japrisot's French crime novel; and Curve starring Julianne Hough, produced by Blumhouse Productions and released by Universal Pictures in 2016.

In 2010, Softley directed a stage adaptation of Backbeat, which was co-written with Stephen Jeffreys. It premiered at the Citizens Theatre in Glasgow, before transferring to the Duke of York's Theatre, in London and then subsequently Toronto, Los Angeles and Berlin.

In 2016, it was announced that Softley would direct Icarus, based on the life of British/American astronaut, Michael Foale, which Softley had developed with writers Hilary Thompson and Laurence Coriat. He would co-produce the project through his company, Forthcoming Films. Softley attended Queens' College, Cambridge at the same time as Foale.

Aside from his work in film, Softley has also worked in television. In 2012, he directed the short film, The Man, as part of Sky Arts' Playhouse Presents strand. The film was a satirical take on the clandestine Bilderberg Group and starred Stellan Skarsgard, Zoe Wannamaker, Hayley Atwell and Stephen Fry. In 2015, the BBC broadcast a two-part adaptation of author Sadie Jones' novel The Outcast which Softley also directed. The film was warmly received by The Guardian, with Julia Raeside writing: "The tone set by Iain Softley's beautifully restrained direction and the careful use of music creates a real feeling of loss from the start, just as in the book, but he somehow avoids all hammy visual foreshadowing and narrative signposting, so often used to gee a plot along".

Softley also directed the Disney+ short film The Shepherd, which stars John Travolta and is an adaptation of Frederick Forsyth's novel The Shepherd.

== Production company ==
Together with his wife, film producer Sarah Curtis, Softley runs Forthcoming Films, which produces and develops their respective projects. Past productions include: Backbeat, On a Clear Day, Hysteria, Trap for Cinderella and Ophelia.

Future productions include: the Michael Foale biopic Icarus.

== Personal life ==
Softley and Curtis live in London. Together, they have three children.

== Filmography ==
=== Film ===
Year	Title	Director	Producer	Writer
1994	Backbeat	Yes	No	Yes
1995	Hackers	Yes	Executive	No
1997	The Wings of the Dove	Yes	No	No
2001	K-PAX	Yes	No	No
2005	The Skeleton Key	Yes	Yes	No
2008	Inkheart	Yes	Yes	No
2013	Trap for Cinderella	Yes	No	Yes
2015	Curve	Yes	No	No
2023	The Shepherd	Yes	No	Yes

=== Television ===
Year	Title	Notes
2012	Playhouse Presents	Episode "The Man"
2015	The Outcast	Miniseries

=== Musical video ===
- "In the Army" by Status Quo (1986)
- "Have You Ever Had It Blue" by The Style Council (1986)
- "How Could an Angel Break My Heart" by Toni Braxton (1997)
