= The Outcast (Jones novel) =

2007 novel by Sadie Jones

- Author: Sadie Jones
- Language: English
- Publication date: 2007
- Publication place: United Kingdom
- ISBN: 9781784700799

The Outcast is the debut novel by British author Sadie Jones, published in 2007 by Chatto & Windus. In 2008, it won the Costa Book Award for First Novel and was shortlisted for the 2008 Women's Prize for Fiction. In 2015, it was adapted for television.

== Summary ==
Set in the 1950s, The Outcast follows Lewis Aldridge, a man from a privileged family who later spent time in prison.

== Reception ==
The Outcast was received positively by critics. The Guardian's review described at as "pure pleasure from captivating first page to teary romantic finish".

Writing in The Independent, Hermione Eyre praised the novel's "clean and clear" prose but compared the protagonist unfavourably to Holden Caulfield. Louisa Thomas, writing for The New York Times, wrote that "although 'The Outcast' doesn't feel original, it's consistently interesting."

== Awards ==
In 2008, The Outcast won the Costa Book Award for First Novel and was shortlisted for the Women's Prize for Fiction.

== TV adaptation ==
In 2015, BBC One broadcast a television adaptation of the novel.
