= What Was Lost =

2007 début novel by Catherine O'Flynn

- First edition cover
- Author: Catherine O'Flynn
- Language: English
- Genre: Fiction
- Publisher: Tindal Street Press
- Publication date: 4 January 2007
- Publication place: United Kingdom
- Media type: Print (Paperback)
- Pages: 240 pp
- ISBN: 0-9551384-1-8
- OCLC: 71542180

What Was Lost is the 2007 début novel by Catherine O'Flynn. The novel is about a girl who goes missing in a shopping centre in 1984, and the people who try to discover what happened to her twenty years later. What Was Lost won the First Novel Award at the 2007 Costa Book Awards, and was shortlisted for the overall Costa Book of the Year Award.

== Development of the novel ==
O'Flynn found inspiration for What Was Lost while she was working as an assistant manager in a record shop. She found ideas for her book from her job in the Merry Hill Shopping Centre near Dudley in the West Midlands.

What Was Lost was rejected by 20 agents and publishers before being accepted for publication by Tindal Street Press, a small Birmingham publisher.

== Plot summary ==
What Was Lost is a mystery story about a missing girl. It is also a portrait of a changing community over twenty years. It examines modern life's emptiness, and society's obsession with shopping.

What Was Lost is set in the city of Birmingham, England. The main events of the novel take place in Green Oaks shopping centre. The first part of the novel is set in 1984. A 10-year-old girl called Kate Meaney frequently plays in the newly opened Green Oaks. She pretends to be a detective, observing and following people. She carries her toy monkey Mickey and a notebook with her. Kate vanishes and Adrian, the 22-year-old son of a newsagent, is the prime suspect in her disappearance. He is hounded by the press and the police. Unable to handle the pressure, he disappears.

The novel's narrative moves forward to 2004. Kurt is a security guard at Green Oaks. He has a sleeping disorder. Lisa is the deputy manager of a music store. She is unhappy because of the strange behaviour of her colleagues and customers and because of her relationship with her partner. She becomes friends with Kurt. A girl holding a soft toy is seen in a CCTV security monitor. Kurt and Lisa follow the girl through Green Oaks and investigate how she is connected to Green Oaks' unsettling history. It is revealed that both Kurt and Lisa have connections to the case of the missing girl.

== Awards and nominations ==
What Was Lost was the winner of the 2007 Costa Book Award for First Novel. O'Flynn received a £5,000 prize. It was shortlisted for the overall Costa Book of the Year Award. The Costa Book Awards' judging panel, chaired by Joanna Trollope, praised the novel for "blending humour and pathos in a cleverly constructed and absorbing mystery." They described the novel as inventive, compelling, and poignant.

What Was Lost was longlisted for the 2007 Man Booker Prize and the Orange Prize for Fiction. It was shortlisted for the Guardian First Book Award. It won the Jelf Group First Novel Award for which O'Flynn received a prize of £2,500. It was BBC Radio 5 Live's Book of the Month in March 2007.
