= Caleb Azumah Nelson =

British writer and photographer

- Born: 1993 (age 32–33)
- Education: Coventry University
- Occupations: Writer; photographer
- Writing career
- Notable works: Open Water (2021); Small Worlds (2023)
- Notable awards: Costa Book Award—First Novel (2021); Betty Trask Award (2022); Somerset Maugham Award (2022); Dylan Thomas Prize (2024)

Caleb Azumah Nelson (born 1993) is a British writer and photographer. His 2021 debut novel, Open Water, won the Costa Book Award for First Novel.

== Personal life ==
Azumah Nelson grew up in Bellingham in South East London and currently lives in South East London. For the first six years of his life, he lived with his maternal grandmother after she moved to London from Ghana, though she eventually returned to her home country.

He was educated at a local "predominantly black primary school" before obtaining a scholarship to the independent Alleyn's School London in Dulwich, where he was "one of only four black kids in the year." He graduated from Coventry University with a sports science degree.

Beyond writing and photography, Azumah Nelson played violin for 10 years. As a teenager was also a talented basketball player with aspirations of playing in Europe and perhaps getting a sports scholarship to an American university; however, he badly dislocated his right shoulder leading to the premature end to his basketball career. It was in lieu of playing basketball that Azumah Nelson began writing prose – which he kept up through his years studying sports science at Coventry University.

Azumah Nelson's dream to become an author began as a teenager in 2019, after his godfather, aunt and three of his grandparents died. Thereafter, Azumah Nelson handed in his notice at Apple and began writing full time.

== Photography ==
At 18 years old Azumah Nelson began using a film camera to continue his passion for photography.

Azumah Nelson believes his "writing and photography go hand in hand" — both acting as "sites of honest expression" that continually encourage him to think about how he sees the world; encouraging him to motivate others as well as himself to move through the world through the eyes of the lens. He emphasises his love for the truth of the lens and expresses that love in his photography. When confronted by the blank page he expresses that, in a way, he is confronting himself as a man through all of the nuances. "There's a freedom in affording myself or others this kind of space, to just be themselves, even if that's for a brief moment."

In 2019, Azumah Nelson won the Palm* Photo People's Choice prize as well as being shortlisted for the Palm* Photo Prize.

== Writing ==
Azumah Nelson's writing has been published in Litro and The White Review.

His short story "Pray" was shortlisted for the BBC National Short Story Award (2020).

Although he is inspired by many artists, Azumah Nelson has stated that his primary role models are Zadie Smith, Lynette Yiadom-Boakye, Kendrick Lamar, Barry Jenkins, and his parents.

=== Open Water (2021) ===
Azumah Nelson's debut novel, Open Water, was published on 4 February 2021 by Viking Press. It won the Costa Book Award for First Novel, a Betty Trask Award (for a first novel by a writer under 35) from the Society of Authors, Debut of the Year at the British Book Awards, and the Somerset Maugham Award, as well as being a number-one Times bestseller. Open Water received additional recognition and nominations for other accolades.

=== Small Worlds (2023) ===
Azumah Nelson's second novel, which he wrote in three months, was published by Viking Press in 2023. Rights for a television adaptation have been acquired by Block Media.

Small Worlds has been described by The Voice as "an exhilarating and expansive novel about the worlds we build for ourselves, the worlds we live, dance and love within." It was characterised by Buzz magazine as "a stunningly poetic novel about identity, grief, and jazz." Colin Grant's analysis in The Guardian included observations about it being "an affecting meditation on the migrant experience," while the reviewer for i newspaper stated that "at times Small Worlds feels like the most sensitive book ever written, because no matter how serious its themes – race riots, a parent's depression – Azumah Nelson deals with it with profound tenderness."

Small Worlds was shortlisted for the Orwell Prize for Political Fiction in 2023 and won the 2024 Dylan Thomas Prize.

== Awards ==
Lit Awards
| Year | Work | Award | Category | Result | Ref. |
|---|---|---|---|---|---|
| 2020 | "Pray" | BBC National Short Story Award | — | Shortlisted | |
| 2021 | Open Water | Booklist's Best First Novels | — | Top 10 | |
| 2021 | Open Water | Costa Book Award | First Novel | Won | |
| 2021 | Open Water | Desmond Elliott Prize | — | Longlisted | |
| 2021 | Open Water | Waterstones Book of the Year | — | Shortlisted | |
| 2022 | Open Water | Betty Trask Prize and Awards | Betty Trask Award | Won | |
| 2022 | Open Water | Somerset Maugham Award | — | Won | |
| 2023 | Small Worlds | Orwell Prize | Political Fiction | Shortlisted | |
| 2024 | Small Worlds | Dylan Thomas Prize | — | Won | |

== Bibliography ==
=== Novels ===
- Open Water (2021)
- Small Worlds (2023)

=== Short stories ===
- A Little Unsteadily into Light (2022, New Island Books)
