= I'll Go to Bed at Noon =

Book by Gerard Woodward

- Author: Gerard Woodward
- Language: English
- Published: 2004
- Publisher: Chatto & Windus
- Publication place: United Kingdom
- ISBN: 978-0393328004

I'll Go to Bed at Noon is a book by author Gerard Woodward. It was shortlisted for Booker Prize (2004).

Set in the north London suburb of Palmers Green in the 1970s, the story opens with Colette Jones attending the funeral of her elder brother's wife, followed by her failed attempts to save him from excessive drinking. Colette tries to exile her talented pianist son from her home, but alcoholism destroys his life as well.

== Critical reception ==
Kirkus Reviews, in a positive review, called the novel "intensely humane and elegantly written". Publishers Weekly likewise gave a positive review, calling the novel "finely sketched".

The Guardian included the novel in their list of best 1000 novels.
