= Susan Fletcher (British author) =

British novelist

- Born: 1979 (age 46–47); Birmingham, England
- Occupation: Writer
- Writing career
- Period: 2004–present

Susan Fletcher (born 1979) is a British novelist.

== Early life ==
Fletcher was born in Birmingham and studied Creative Writing at the University of East Anglia.

== Career ==
Her first novel, Eve Green, was published in 2004 by Fourth Estate, an imprint of HarperCollins. It features an eight-year-old girl who is sent to a new life in rural Wales. It won the Whitbread First Novel Award, the Authors' Club Award and the Betty Trask Award; it was also shortlisted for he Los Angeles Times Book Prize and was picked for Channel 4's Richard and Judy Summer Reading List.

Subsequent novels have been shortlisted for the John Llewellyn Rhys Award, the Writers' Guild fiction Award and the Romantic Novel of the Year Award. Her novel Witch Light won the Saint Maur en Poche Award 2013 in France.

In 2022, Fletcher signed a two-book contract with Transworld, an imprint of Penguin Random House. Her eighth novel, The Night in Question, will be published by Transworld in April 2024.

She has also worked as a Fellow of the Royal Literary Fund at the University of Worcester (2016–18 and 2020–23).

== Personal ==
Fletcher lives in Stratford upon Avon, Warwickshire.

== Works ==
- Eve Green (2004)
- Oystercatchers (2007)
- Corrag (2010); also published as Witch Light and (in America) The Highland Witch
- The Silver Dark Sea (2012)
- A Little in Love (2014)
- Let Me Tell You About a Man I Knew (2016)
- House of Glass (2018)
- The Night in Question (2024)
