= Christie Watson =

British writer

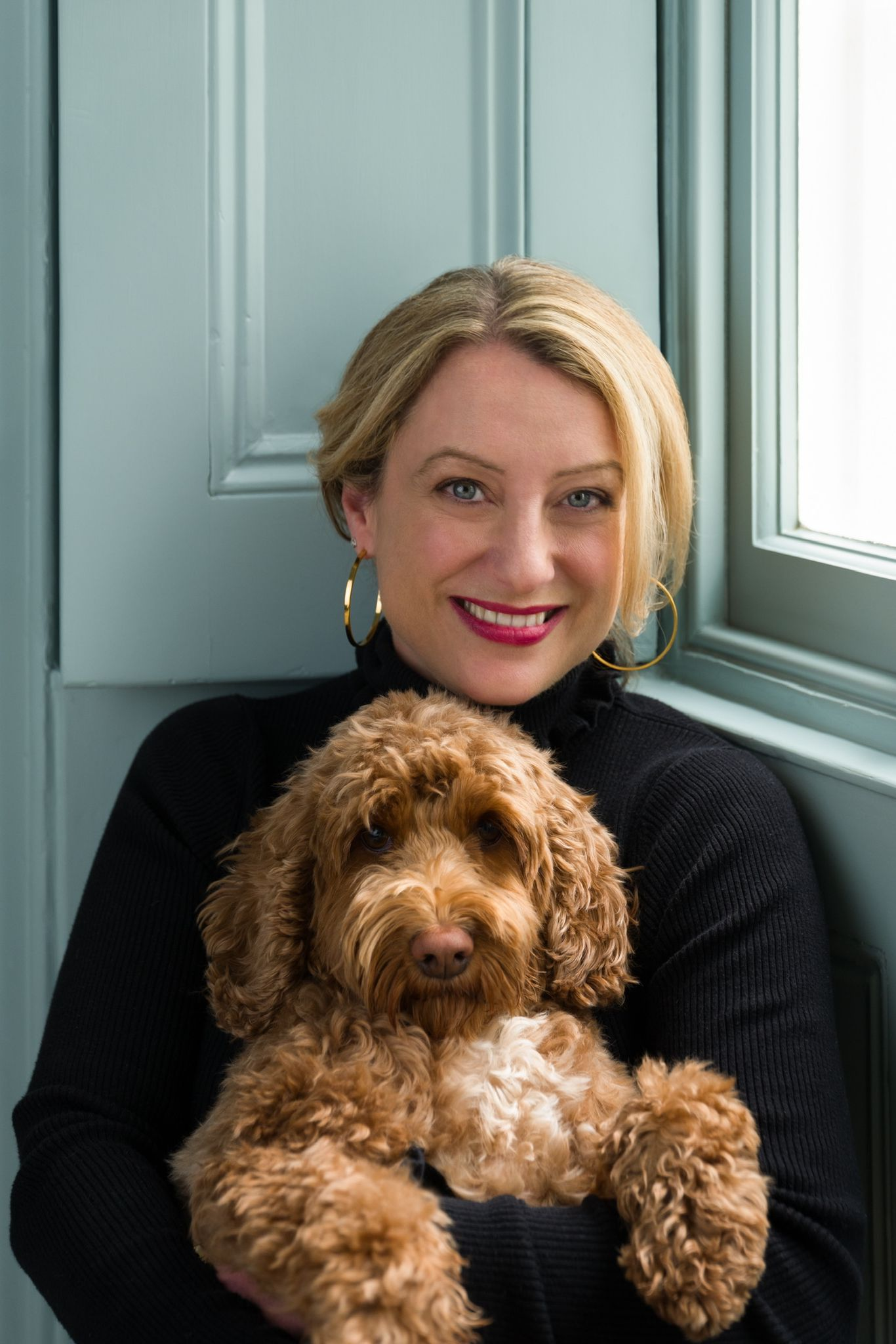
- Watson in 2022
- Education: University of East Anglia
- Occupation: Writer
- Notable work: Tiny Sunbirds Far Away (2011); The Language of Kindness: A Nurse's Story (2018)
- Awards: Costa First Novel Award
- Website: www.christiewatsonauthor.co.uk

Christie Watson is a British writer and Professor of Creative Writing at the University of East Anglia and worked for more than twenty years as a nurse before becoming an author. She has written eight books: four novels, including her first novel Tiny Sunbirds Far Away (2011), which won the Costa First Novel Award, and four works of non-fiction, including memoir, The Language of Kindness which was a number one Sunday Times Bestseller and spent five months in the Top Ten Bestseller list. Her work has been translated into twenty-three languages, adapted for theatre, and is currently being developed as a television series. Killing Me Softly, her latest novel, will be released March 2026.

== Career ==
Her nursing career included Great Ormond Street Hospital, St Mary's Hospital, Paddington, and Guy's and St Thomas' Hospital.

She won the Malcolm Bradbury Bursary, which enabled her to take an MA in creative writing at the University of East Anglia, from where she graduated in 2009.

Her first novel, Tiny Sunbirds Far Away, won the Costa First Novel Award in the 2011 Costa Book Awards.

Her second novel, Where Women Are Kings (2014), also won critical praise and has been widely translated.

In 2018, she published a memoir, The Language of Kindness: A Nurse's Story, which was broadcast as Book of the Week on BBC Radio 4 in May 2018 and spent more than five months in The Sunday Times Top-Ten Bestseller list. It was named as a Book of the Year in 2018 by The Guardian, Sunday Times, The Daily Telegraph, The Times, New Statesman, Netgalley and The Reading Agency.

Watson published two further memoirs to critical acclaim: The Courage to Care and Quilt on Fire both receiving five-star critical reviews.

Weidenfeld & Nicolson have acquired three novels from Watson in a major deal. The first, Moral Injuries, has been published in 2024 and received positive reviews, including praise for best new thrillers. It is currently being developed as a television series.

No Filters a memoir written by Christie Watson and her daughter, Rowan Egberongbe, was published January 2025 and received widespread critical praise and was serialised in The Observer

== Public engagement ==
Watson lives in London, England. She is a contributor to the media including The Guardian, The Telegraph, The New York Times, and has been a guest speaker for various radio and television shows including BBC Radio 4 and BBC Radio 2, BBC News, Sky News, The Lorraine Show.

Watson has delivered speeches across the UK, including the keynote speech at Royal College of Nursing Conference, and TedX.

She appears regularly at literary festivals, such as Hay, Southbank, and Edinburgh.

== Achievements ==
Achievement	Year
University of East Anglia - Doctor of Letters Honoris Causa	2018
Shortlisted BBI Narrative Non-Fiction Book of the Year	2018
Shortlisted IBW Adult Book Award	2018
Marie Claire Magazine – Future Shaper Award	2018
Waverton Good Read Award	2013
Red Magazine's Hot Woman of the Year (Creative)	2012
Costa Book Award for First Novel	2012

Christie Watson is Patron of the RCN Foundation.

== Bibliography ==
- Tiny Sunbirds Far Away, Quercus, 2011. ISBN 978-1849163750
- Where Women are Kings, Quercus, 2014. ISBN 978-1849163811
- Here I Stand, Walker Books, 2016. ISBN 978-1-4063-5838-4
- The Language of Kindness: A Nurse's Story, 3 May 2018. ISBN 978-1-5247-6163-9
- The Courage to Care: nurses, families and hope, 2020. ISBN 1784742988
- Quilt on Fire: The Messy Magic of Midlife, 2022 ISBN 1784744042
- Moral Injuries, March 2024, ISBN 1399613073
- No Filters: A Mother and Teenager Daughter Love Story, January 2025, ISBN 978-1784744595
