= Open Water (novel) =

2021 novel by Caleb Azumah Nelson

- Author: Caleb Azumah Nelson
- Language: English
- Genre: Romance
- Publisher: Viking Press UK (UK); Grove Press (US)
- Publication date: 4 February 2021 (UK); 13 April 2021 (US)
- Publication place: United Kingdom; United States
- Media type: Print (hardcover, paperback), ebook, Kindle
- Pages: 145 pp
- Awards: Costa—First Novel (2021); Betty Trask Award (2022); Somerset Maugham Award (2022)
- ISBN: 9780241448779 (UK 1st ed)
- OCLC: 1154813692
- Dewey Decimal: 823/.92
- LC Class: PR6114.E57 O64 2021

Open Water is a novel by Caleb Azumah Nelson, published 4 February 2021 by Viking Press and again in 2022 by Penguin Books. It is a romance novel about two Black people, dealing with themes such as race, love and masculinity. The novel is written from a second person point of view, and features a protagonist who remains unnamed throughout.

== Plot ==
The book begins with "you" (the main character) walking into a bar where you see a beautiful woman who your friend knows. You instantly feel a connection and you ask your friend to introduce the two of you, which he does, but you find out your friend and the woman are together. You learn that she's a dancer and she learns that you're a photographer. A couple of weeks later, you meet, and she suggests that you start working on a documentary on Black people; you agree, and you start meeting more often. These meetings strengthen your connection, and you learn more about each other – how you both went to private school, and how being one of the few Black kids affected you. How you had to find a hobby that became a safe space for you, a place to escape when the everyday racism became too much. You connected through your shared experience of life, how you were treated differently because of your skin colour, how you were seen as a Black body rather than a human, and how this has made you feel like you don't belong anywhere. These shared experiences deepen your relationship, and your feelings grow. She becomes a safe space, someone you can talk to, cry before and be yourself with without being judged. You can cry because you're sad that your grandmother died, or that your friend was killed, because she will be there to hold you.

After the woman and your friend break up, you start spending more time with her, even though you know it's wrong. The relationship becomes more physical, but the two of you remain unable to commit to one another. Part of that is the constant fear and violence surrounding your lives. Being Black means living with inequality and injustice, including from the police who are supposed to protect you.

The book repeatedly returns to encounters with the police where false accusations were thrown your way because they have already reduced you to a category, that is, a Black body rather than an individual person. You have watched this prejudice have fatal consequences for some of your friends. and how this makes you live in constant fear, and as a result, fear becomes part of how you move through the world, making trust difficult. It also extends into your relationship. You can’t tell her about your traumas, feelings and fears. Without that openness, the relationship begins to deteriorate, and eventually, the two of you break up. You never tell her how you feel and she interprets your silence as rejection. The break-up leaves you numb and the music in your life disappears with her, and you move through the days without much feeling. A year passes before you muster up the courage to tell her about your fears and desires. She tells you about her own as well. The conversation restores your ability to feel and with it, the music. You cry for her, for yourself and for the two of you.

== Personal background ==
The year before Azumah Nelson began writing Open Water, his godfather, aunt, and three grandparents died. He spoke of his writing at the time, saying it "came about as I was trying to afford my grief, and in turn, myself, more form and detail. I didn’t want to feel so hazy anymore. So I was spending a lot of the time at libraries, gallery spaces, cinemas, concerts, trying to go past the level of knowing, towards feeling, and asking where those feelings come from. That’s a question which is written throughout Open Water. How do you feel?”

Azumah Nelson continued, "There’s a level of vulnerability which love demands. To ask someone to see you is to ask someone to see all of you and trusting someone with all of you can be difficult. To see all this beauty and rhythm and joy but also to see your uglier parts, your pain, your grief. But it’s wonderful when it does happen, when you are no longer being looked at, but being seen.”

The writer said "he had to make himself vulnerable to write it," much like the poet Morgan Parker says writers sometimes must "[dig] so deep you touch bone." Azumah Nelson said, "I feel like I did this and then some. It is a joy to write but at times, quite heartbreaking. I guess, I’d love for readers not just to know what I’m saying, but to feel it too. The book is written in the second person so it’s very intimate, and in that way when a question is asked, I’m asking both myself and the reader. When I’m asking, How do you feel? That question comes both ways."

== Development history ==
Nelson is also a photographer and to write Open Water he told Penguin, his publisher, in an interview that he looked at pictures he had taken and put them into words, how they made him feel, what they said. This is also a part of the book where the main character is a photographer and captures different moments through his lens; he describes how they look as well as how they make you feel. In the same interview Azumah Nelson tells his publisher Penguin about the background of why he wrote the book. He says “Open Water is a love story but it’s also an ode to everything I love: South East London and books, music and photography, film and fine art. I wanted to write a book which read like an album, like music, so musicians such as Kendrick Lamar and Solange and J Dilla were instrumental to the conception of the book. Photography too – I often feel like when I’m writing, I’m transcribing snapshots of moments I can see.”

== Release history ==
Originally published 4 February 2021 by Viking Press in the UK, under the Viking UK imprint of Penguin Random House, it was released in both hardcover and ebook format. Paperback and ebook editions in the US were published 13 April 2021 by Grove Press.

Penguin later reprinted a paperback on 3 February 2022.

Date	Country	Language	Publisher	Format	ISBN / Identification
4 February 2021	UK	English	Viking Press UK	Hardcover 1st ed.	ISBN 9780241448779
4 February 2021	UK	English	Penguin	ebook	ISBN 9780241989470
4 February 2021	UK	English	Penguin	Kindle	ASIN B088NRG888
13 April 2021	US	English	Grove Press	Paperback 1st ed.	ISBN 9780802157942
13 April 2021	US	English	Grove Press	ebook	ISBN 9780802157959
13 April 2021	US	English	Grove Press	Kindle	ASIN B08L9QFG7J
3 February 2022	UK	English	Penguin	Paperback reprint	ISBN 9780241448786

=== In translation ===
The novel has been translated into several languages, including Spanish, French, Italian, Dutch, Greek, Swedish, Portuguese, Slovenian, Polish, and Chinese.

== Reception ==
=== Reviews ===
Open Water received starred reviews from Library Journal and Booklist, as well as positive reviews from Kirkus Reviews, The Guardian, The New York Times Book Review, Chicago Review of Books, The Wall Street Journal, The Irish Times, Los Angeles Review of Books, Washington Independent Review of Books, and Publishers Weekly.

As a debut, the book has been called "truly exceptional," "exciting, ambitious," "breathtaking," and "searing."

Guernica's Mary Wang applauded Azumah Nelson's writing, saying, "Open Water's narrative moves like jazz, punctured with loops, diversions, and improvisation. The characters' relationship is sketched through a series of images that emerge as quickly as they fade, as if tied to a rolling film reel."

Ploughshares' Brady Brickner-Wood provided a mixed review, noting that the book is "brimming with brilliant ideas and charming interiority," but it "struggles to temper its lyricism and narrative ambitions, resulting in a captivating if not uneven read." Despite criticisms, Brickner-Wood called Open Water "a moving novel that celebrates Black art and explores generational trauma."

TIME named Open Water one of the best novels of the year, and The Observer named it one of the top ten debut novels of the year.

=== Awards ===
Year	Award	Category	Result	Ref.
2021	Booklist's Best First Novels	—	Top 10	
2021	Costa Book Award	First Novel	Won	
2021	Desmond Elliott Prize	—	Longlisted	
2021	Waterstones Book of the Year	—	Shortlisted	
2022	Betty Trask Award	—	Won	
2022	Somerset Maugham Award	—	Won	
