= Anne Youngson =

English novelist (born 1947/1948)

- Born: 1947 or 1948 (age 77–78)
- Education: Birmingham University (BA); Oxford Brookes University (MA, PhD)
- Occupation: Novelist
- Years active: c. 2017–present

Anne Youngson (born 1947 or 1948) is an English novelist. She published her first novel, Meet Me at the Museum, at the age of 70 after a career in the motor industry

== Early life and education ==
Youngson was born in 1947 or 1948.

She has a BA in English literature from Birmingham University (1970), an MA in creative writing and a PhD from Oxford Brookes University (2012). Her doctoral thesis was Once upon a time: how stories start: it considered the opening words of short stories and included a group of stories written for the thesis.

== Career ==
Youngson was a senior engineer at Rover before taking early retirement at the age of 56.

Her first novel, Meet Me at the Museum, was shortlisted for the Costa Book Award for First Novel. It was adapted for broadcast by BBC Radio 4.

== Selected publications ==
- Carver, Mike; Seale, Nicholas; Youngson, Anne, eds. (2008). When Rover Met Honda: Insights and Memories. CSY Publishing. ISBN 978-0956034304.
- Carver, Mike; Seale, Nick; Youngson, Anne (2015). British Leyland Motor Corporation 1968-2005: The Story from Inside. London: The History Press. ISBN 978-0750961448.
- Youngson, Anne (2018). Meet me at the museum (First ed.). Flatiron Books. ISBN 978-1-250-29516-3.
- Youngson, Anne (2020). Three women and a boat. London: Doubleday. ISBN 978-0857527097.
- Youngson, Anne (2022). The six who came to dinner: stories. London: Doubleday. ISBN 978-0857528254.
- Youngson, Anne (2022). The Narrowboat Summer. Flatiron. ISBN 978-1250764621.
- Youngson, Anne (2023). A Complicated Matter. Doubleday. ISBN 978-0857528230.
