= Monica Baly =

English nurse and historian

Monica Eileen Baly OBE FRCN
- Born: 24 May 1914
- Died: 12 November 1998 (aged 84)
- Employer: Royal College of Nursing

Monica Eileen Baly (24 May 1914 – 12 November 1998) was an English nurse, historian of nursing, and an advocate for social change. She was the first Chair of the History of Nursing Society at the Royal College of Nursing, and was elected a centenary fellow of the Queen's Nursing Institute in 1985.

== Early life ==
Baly was born on 24 May 1914 in Surrey. Monica Baly studied at the St. Hilda's School for Girls in London.

== Education and career ==
Baly trained in the London County Council Fever Hospital followed by professional nursing training at the Middlesex Hospital, qualifying in 1938. She then qualified as a midwife at the Middlesex Hospital in 1939. Her wartime service included work in Italy, setting up a burns unit for the Princess Mary's Royal Air Force Nursing Service for which she was mentioned in dispatches. She then worked in Cairo during a typhoid epidemic, followed by time as chief nursing officer in the displaced persons camps in the British Zone of post-war Germany. Returning to the UK she undertook the Health Visitors Certificate at the Royal College of Nursing.

Shortly after this she became a chief nursing officer in 1949 for the Royal College of Nursing (RCN). In 1951 she became the RCN's Western Area Organiser, based in Bath, Somerset. Baly was an activist working toward fair living wages for nurses, having produced an index showing it was impossible to live on the wage of a first year health visitor. She subsequently led the RCN's 1969 "Raise the Roof" campaign, which resulted in a 22% pay raise for nurses.

Baly began writing regularly in the mid-1960s, entering the British Medical Association's annual essay competition for nurses where she won first prize twice. Alongside her RCN role, she lectured for over twenty years at Bath and Bristol Polytechnics on their Diploma in Nursing courses. She was also examiner for Diploma of Nursing at the University of London. In 1973 she authored Nursing and Social Change before retiring in 1974.

She was made a Fellow of the Royal College of Nursing in 1986. She earned a Bachelor of Arts from the Open University in 1979, and then undertook a PhD in Nursing and Social Change, completing it at the age of 70. She wrote her doctoral dissertation was on the life of Florence Nightingale, and also wrote a history of the Queen's Nursing Institute. The Institute elected her a centenary fellow in 1985.

Baly lived in Bath for almost 50 years, and was active in her community including the Bath Festival, Bath Abbey and supporting a campaign for the preservation of the Royal Crescent.

Baly died in Bath on the 12th November 1998.

== Legacy ==
Baly founded and was the first Chair of the History of Nursing Society at the Royal College of Nursing, and founded a journal for nursing history. When Baly died in 1988, she left money for a scholarship in the area. The Monica Baly Fund, RCN Foundation continues to offer small grants to support research into the history of nursing and midwifery by registered nurses and midwives who might otherwise not be able to undertake this work.
