= The Outcast (British TV series) =

- Genre: Drama
- Based on: The Outcast by Sadie Jones
- Screenplay by: Sadie Jones
- Directed by: Iain Softley
- Starring: Finn Elliot; George MacKay; Hattie Morahan; Greg Wise; Jessica Brown Findlay; Nathaniel Parker; Jessica Barden; Daisy Bevan
- Country of origin: United Kingdom
- Original language: English
- No. of series: 1
- No. of episodes: 2

Production
- Producer: Celia Duval
- Running time: 90 minutes
- Production companies: Blueprint Pictures; BBC

Original release
- Network: BBC One
- Release: 12 July – 19 July 2015

The Outcast is a British two-part television adaptation of Sadie Jones' 2008 debut novel of the same name. It was first broadcast on BBC One on 12 July and 19 July 2015.

== Plot summary ==
Lewis Aldridge (Finn Elliot) is ten years old when he goes on a picnic with his mother (Hattie Morahan) and witnesses her drowning. His emotionally distant father (Greg Wise) struggles to deal with the situation and is soon remarried, to Alice (Jessica Brown Findlay). Lewis' young and well-meaning new stepmother tries her best, but is unable to reach Lewis emotionally. In adolescence, Lewis (George MacKay) is taunted about the circumstances surrounding his mother's death and begins to self-harm. He subsequently sets the local church on fire and spends time in prison for committing arson. On his release from prison, he has increasingly complicated relationships with his stepmother, with Tamsin Carmichael (Daisy Bevan), and with Kit Carmichael (Jessica Barden). Lewis separately confronts his father and the bullying Dicky Carmichael (Nathaniel Parker), before Kit and Lewis declare their love for each other, as Lewis is leaving to complete his National Service.

== Cast ==
Lewis Aldridge is portrayed as a child by Finn Elliot, and as a young man by George MacKay. Lewis' mother, Elizabeth, is played by Hattie Morahan and his father, Gilbert, by Greg Wise. Alice, his step-mother, is acted by Jessica Brown Findlay.

Dicky Carmichael is played by Nathaniel Parker, and his wife, Claire, by Helen Bradbury. Kit Carmichael is played by Jocelyn MacNab as a child and Jessica Barden as a young woman. Tamsin, her older sister, is played by Edie Whitehead as a child and Daisy Bevan as an adult.

== Production ==
The screenplay for the television adaptation of The Outcast was written by the author Sadie Jones from her own novel of the same name. It was directed by Iain Softley and produced by Celia Duval on behalf of Blueprint Pictures Limited.

== Reception ==
Terry Ramsey, reviewing the first episode in The Daily Telegraph found himself "sternly unmoved" by its "relentlessly emotional, heart-tugging story of tragedy, its gushing orchestral music and its soft-focus shots of people with quivering lower lips and moistening eyes". He added, "I knew the programme makers had been trying to make me feel something. But their attempts at manipulation were so clumsy and obvious that it actually became annoying. Rather than shedding a tear at Lewis’s plight, I wanted to get hold of the producers and beat them about the head for allowing this to be so clichéd and self-indulgent". Reviewing episode two, the Daily Telegraph’s Jasper Rees was also unimpressed. Having recognised that, "The quality of the acting ensured much of this portrait of a stiff-backed patriarchy producing unhappiness in women and children rang true. Greg Wise in particular was convincing as Lewis’s emotionally vacant father, while Nathaniel Parker snaffled up the chance to embody a cold-hearted bully in a blazer", Rees added that, "And yet something in the storyboarding fatally depleted the atmosphere of accumulating tension. The plot frogmarched disjointedly from one crisis to the next, giving important scenes insufficient room to breathe and bringing a psychological coarseness to fine-grained undercurrents of feeling".

Writing in The Guardian, Julia Raeside voiced her initial concerns about the adaptation, saying: "Sadie Jones risked smashing a perfect thing when she signed up to adapt her book The Outcast (BBC1, Sunday) for television. The novel, one of my favourites, bursts with a fragile intensity that, while filmic, seemed unlikely to survive the transition". However, she found Finn Elliot's portrayal of the younger Lewis to be "thoroughly convincing", describing him as an "astonishing young talent". Raeside was equally impressed with Hattie Morahan's portrayal of his drowned mother, writing, "She is so perfectly cast, the lack of her is palpable on screen. We miss her too." She also had praise for Jones’ screenplay and Iain Softley's direction, saying, "Every character uses a tenth of the words another writer might employ, because it’s all there. No need for prodding and over-talking. The tone set by Iain Softley’s beautifully restrained direction and the careful use of music creates a real feeling of loss from the start, just as in the book, but he somehow avoids all hammy visual foreshadowing and narrative signposting, so often used to gee a plot along."

In The Independent on Sunday, Ellen E. Jones found that the adaptation, "brings something unusual to television; a portrait of the conformist and snobbish side of post-war Britain. In a medium that’s enamoured of bunting and home-baking (The Great British Bake Off), nurturing communities (Call the Midwife), and the benefits of a stiff upper lip in civilian life (Foyle’s War), this is a useful and welcome corrective".
