= Brian Bilston =

British poet and writer (born 1970)

- Born: Paul Millicheap; 14 June 1970 (age 56); Birmingham, England
- Education: Swansea University
- Occupations: Poet, writer
- Writing career
- Period: 2010s–present

Paul Millicheap (born 14 June 1970), who writes as Brian Bilston, is a British poet and author.

== Biography ==
Born in Birmingham, England, he studied at the University of Wales, Swansea, before entering the publishing industry as a marketing manager, notably for John Wiley in Oxford.

Using the pseudonym Brian Bilston, he began publishing short and pithy, often humorous, poems on Twitter, which were then spread widely on social media. He gained up to 400,000 followers, and has been described as "The Poet Laureate of Twitter". The poet Ian McMillan described Bilston as "a laureate for our fractured times", and he has been compared to Don Marquis, Dorothy Parker, and Ogden Nash.

Bilston has published three collections of verse, You Took the Last Bus Home (2016); Alexa, What Is There to Know About Love? (2021); and Days Like These: An Alternative Guide to the Year in 366 Poems (2022). He has also written a book of football poems, 50 Ways to Score a Goal (2021). His first novel, Diary of a Somebody (2019), was shortlisted for the Costa Book Award for First Novel, and his poem "Refugees" has been published as an illustrated book for children. In 2023, he published a book of "seasonally adjusted poems", And So This Is Christmas.

He has been called "the Banksy of the poetry world"; in publicity photographs promoting his speaking tours, he hides his face behind a book.

In 2025, Bilston was shortlisted for the CLiPPA poetry award for his children's collection, Let Sleeping Cats Lie (Pan Macmillan, 2024) In an interview for Just Imagine he said 'One thing I would say is that it's easier to take all the shackles off when you’re writing for children. I think there's less expectation that a poem needs to be a particular kind of thing. Basically, children are far more imaginative and accepting and carry so much more joy in them than a lot of grown-ups. '

He also recorded and released an album, Sounds Made By Humans, with indiepop band the Catenary Wires.

== Publications ==
- You Took the Last Bus Home (2016)
- Diary of a Somebody (2019)
- 50 Ways to Score a Goal (2021)
- Alexa, What Is There to Know About Love? (2021)
- Days Like These: An Alternative Guide to the Year in 366 Poems (2022)
- Refugees (2022, illustrated by José Sanabria)
- And So This Is Christmas (2023)
- Let Sleeping Cats Lie (2024)
- How to Lay an Egg with a Horse Inside: An Alternative Guide to Writing and Enjoying Poetry (2026)
