= Teddy Sears =

American actor

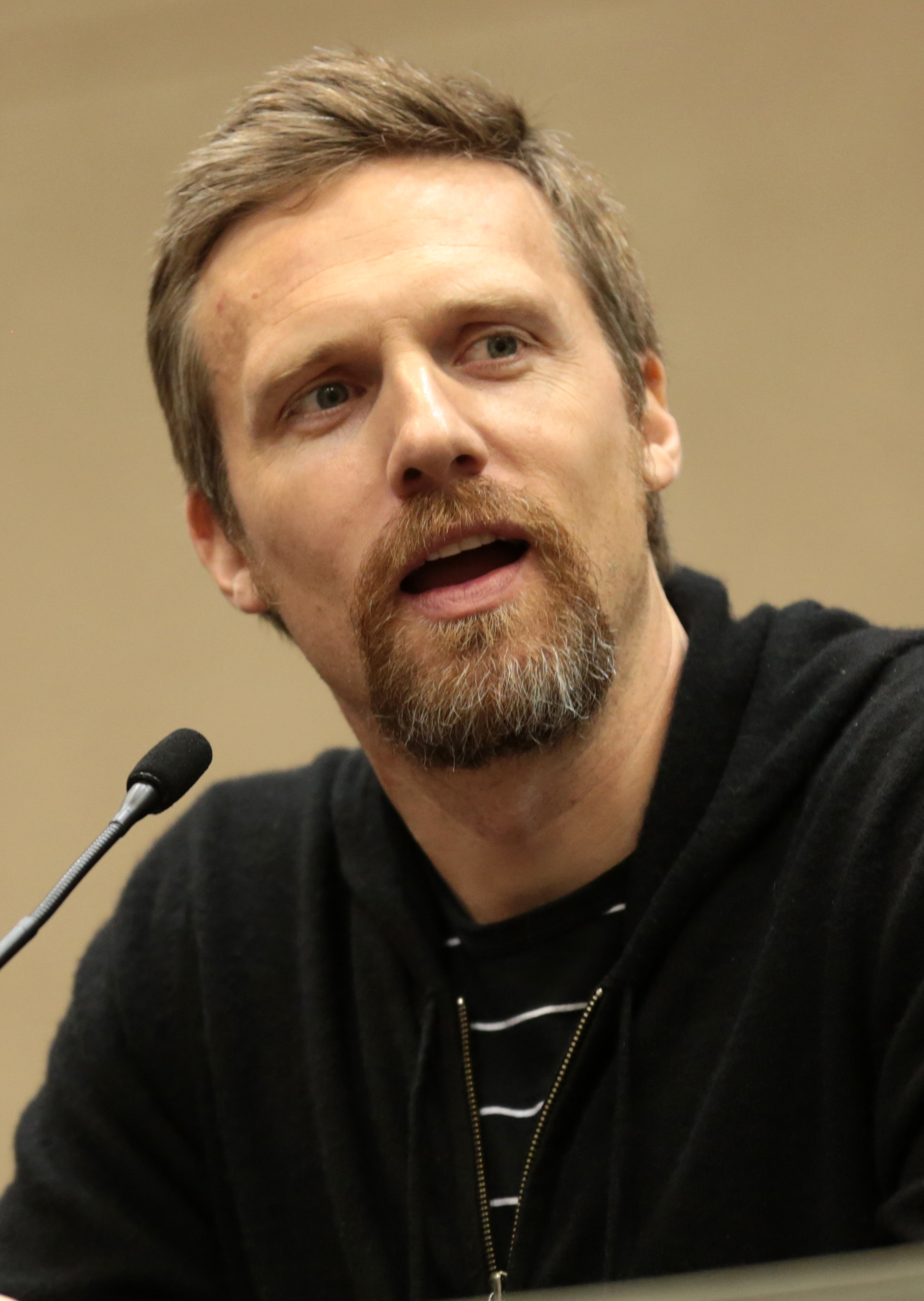
- Sears in 2017
- Born: Washington, D.C., United States
- Occupation: Actor
- Years active: 2001–present
- Spouse: Milissa Skoro (m. 2013)

Teddy Sears is an American actor, known for his roles as Richard Patrick Woolsley on the TNT legal drama series Raising the Bar, Patrick on the first season of FX anthology horror drama American Horror Story (retroactively titled Murder House), Dr. Austin Langham on the Showtime period drama series Masters of Sex, and DC Comics supervillain Hunter Zolomon / Zoom of the television series The Flash.

== Early life and education ==
Sears was born in Washington, D.C., and raised in Chevy Chase, Maryland. He attended high school at the Landon School in Bethesda, Maryland. Sears played football for the University of Maryland, but transferred and graduated from the University of Virginia with a degree in business management in 1999.

== Career ==
Sears' business career in New York was put on hold as he won a role on his first audition, with a two-year contract role on the daytime series One Life to Live. Then, after several appearances on the Law & Order franchise and Whoopi, he attended the William Esper Studio. This training led to comedy stints on the Late Show with David Letterman and Late Night with Conan O'Brien.

He co-starred on the TNT original series Raising the Bar portraying public defender Richard Patrick Woolsley.

Sears appeared in Joss Whedon's Dollhouse, the Lifetime original film The Client List, and as Thomas Cole in The Defenders.

In 2013, Sears joined the cast of the Showtime drama Masters of Sex, about the work of Masters and Johnson. From 2015 to 2016, Sears had been cast in a recurring role of The CW's DC Comics television series The Flash, initially introduced as Jay Garrick, until it was revealed that his character was actually Hunter Zolomon / Zoom. In 2017, he starred as Keith Mullins in 24: Legacy.

In 2020, Sears appeared as a guest on the Studio 60 on the Sunset Strip marathon fundraiser episode of The George Lucas Talk Show.

== Personal life ==
Sears married actress Milissa Skoro on October 5, 2013. In his free time he surfs and plays ice hockey. He has two brothers, Christian and Ricky, and a sister Dana.

His great-grandfather Harry Edward Sears won a gold medal in the 1912 Olympics for pistol shooting, and his aunt Mary Jane Parks won a bronze medal in the 1956 Olympics for the 100-yard butterfly.

== Filmography ==
=== Film ===
| Year | Title | Role | Notes |
|---|---|---|---|
| 2001 | To End All Wars | Paratrooper | Uncredited |
| 2005 | The Legacy of Walter Frumm | Stephen | |
| 2005 | In Between | Ken | |
| 2006 | Cosa Bella | Husband | Short film |
| 2007 | Firehouse Dog | Terrance Kahn | |
| 2008 | Os Desafinados | Cool New Yorker | |
| 2009 | A Single Man | Mr. Strunk | |
| 2015 | Curve | Christian Laughton | |
| 2016 | Nine Lives | Josh Myers | |
| 2017 | Liv | Michael | |
| 2023 | Justice League: Warworld | Warlord (voice) | Direct-to-video |

=== Television ===
| Year | Title | Role | Notes |
|---|---|---|---|
| 2001 | Sex and the City | Fashion show guy (uncredited) | Episode: "The Real Me" |
| 2001 | One Life to Live | Chad Bennett | |
| 2003 | Law & Order: Special Victims Unit | Josh Sanford | Episode: "Dominance" |
| 2004 | Whoopi | Waiter | Episode: "No Sex in the City" |
| 2004 | Law & Order: Criminal Intent | Teddy | Episode: "Ill-Bred" |
| 2005 | Late Show with David Letterman | Blind Justice | 2 episodes |
| 2005 | Late Night with Conan O'Brien | High-definition Conan | Episode dated April 29, 2005 |
| 2005 | Late Show with David Letterman | Batman | Season 12, episode 159 |
| 2006 | Justice | Greg Hall | Episode: "Behind the Orange Curtain" |
| 2006 | Studio 60 on the Sunset Strip | Darren Wells | 2 episodes |
| 2006 | CSI: Miami | Peter Kinkella | 2 episodes |
| 2006–07 | Ugly Betty | Hunter | 2 episodes |
| 2007 | Raines | Mitchell Parks | Episode: "5th Step" |
| 2007 | Big Love | Greg Samuelson | Episode: "Circle the Wagons" |
| 2007 | Mad Men | Kicks Matherton | Episode: "Red in the Face" |
| 2008 | Carpoolers | Handsome man | Episode: "The Handsomest Man" |
| 2008 | Las Vegas | Brian O'Toole | Episode: "Win, Place, Bingo" |
| 2008 | Rules of Engagement | Drake | Episode: "Optimal Male" |
| 2008 | Samantha Who? | Brad | Episode: "The Family Vacation" |
| 2008–09 | Raising the Bar | Richard Patrick Woolsley | Main role; 24 episodes |
| 2009 | Dollhouse | Mike | Episode: "Needs" |
| 2010 | Law & Order: Special Victims Unit | Executive A.D.A. Garrett Blaine | Episode: "Disabled" |
| 2010 | Backyard Wedding | Evan Slauson | Television film (Hallmark) |
| 2010 | The Client List | Rex Horton | Television film (Lifetime) |
| 2010–11 | The Defenders | ADA Thomas Cole | 9 episodes |
| 2011 | In Plain Sight | Tom Kulpak | Episode: "I'm a Liver Not a Fighter" |
| 2011 | Necessary Roughness | Bobby Caldwell | Episode: "Poker Face" |
| 2011 | Torchwood: Miracle Day | Blue-eyed Man | 4 episodes |
| 2011 | American Horror Story: Murder House | Patrick | 4 episodes |
| 2011 | Rizzoli & Isles | Rory Graham | Episode: "Seventeen Ain't So Sweet" |
| 2011–12 | Blue Bloods | Sam Croft | 2 episodes |
| 2012 | Drew Peterson: Untouchable | Mike Adler | Television film (Lifetime) |
| 2012 | Harry's Law | Alan Bagley | Episode: "Les Horribles" |
| 2012–13 | 666 Park Avenue | Detective Hayden Cooper | 5 episodes |
| 2013–16 | Masters of Sex | Dr. Austin Langham | 20 episodes |
| 2015–18, 2023 | The Flash | Hunter Zolomon / Zoom | Recurring role (season 2); Special guest star (seasons 5 & 9) |
| 2017 | 24: Legacy | Keith Mullins | Main role |
| 2017 | Christmas in Evergreen | Ryan | Television film (Hallmark) |
| 2018 | Timeless | Lucas Calhoun | Episode: "Hollywoodland" |
| 2018 | How to Get Away with Murder | Dr. Abe Charmagne | Episode: "It Was the Worst Day of My Life" |
| 2018–19 | Chicago Fire | Kyle Sheffield | 10 episodes |
| 2019–20 | The Politician | William Ward | 5 episodes |
| 2020 | The George Lucas Talk Show | Himself | Stu-D2 1138 on the Binary Sunset Sith (Studio 60 on the Sunset Strip marathon) |
| 2021 | Impeachment: American Crime Story | James A. Fisher | 4 episodes |
| 2021 | S.W.A.T. | Tripp Hersch | Episode: "Crisis Actor" |
| 2022 | American Horror Stories | Jeffery Webber | Episode: "Lake" |
| 2022 | NCIS: Hawaiʻi | Greg Winslow | Episode: "T'N'T" |
| 2024–26 | Brilliant Minds | Josh Nichols | Main role |
| 2025 | The Night Agent | Warren Stocker | Season 2; 2 episodes |
| 2026 | X-Men '97 | Alex Summers / Havok (voice) | 4 episodes |
