= RCN Foundation =

- Formation: 2010
- Legal status: Registered charity number: SC043663 (Scotland) 1134606 (England and Wales) | Registered Company: 7026001
- Headquarters: 20 Cavendish Square, London
- Region served: United Kingdom
- Website: https://rcnfoundation.rcn.org.uk/

The RCN Foundation is an independent UK charitable trust that supports nursing to improve health and the well-being of the public.The charity was launched in 2010. It operates in the United Kingdom (England, Wales, Scotland, Northern Ireland).

== History ==
The RCN Foundation was registered as a limited company in Sep 2009 and incorporated as a charity in 2010. It was established in 2010, when the Royal College of Nursing (RCN) separated its charitable and trade union activities.

From 2010 all funds relating to charitiable activities were passed to the Foundation. This included funds for educational activity, part of RCN activities since its inception in 1916. This had included some high profile events such as the film premier of The Lady with a Lamp in 1951, attended by the then Princess Elizabeth as President of the Student Nurses Association.

== Charitable objects ==
The RCN Foundation supports nursing to improve health and the well-being of the public. They support the development of clinical practice to improve the quality and standard of care and patient experience and the learning and development of nursing, midwifery and healthcare professionals. The Foundation also provides one-off hardship grants through its Benevolent Fund.

The charity focuses on supporting education and training; the advancement of health or saving of lives; and the prevention or relief of poverty, primarily by focusing on those in nursing, midwifery and healthcare. Their activities include making grants to individuals; making grants to organisations; providing advocacy, advice, and/or information; and by sponsoring or undertaking research

== Awards ==
The RCN Foundation regularly advertises awards to support nursing and midwifery professionals, students and healthcare support workers. This includes in-career and post qualification activities such as postgraduate university study or short courses.

These include specific opportunities such as the Mair Scholarship in Scotland or the Monica Baly grant for researching the history of nursing. There have been one-off partnerships such as ten travel scholarships focusing on clinical leadership 2014-2017 provided in partnership with the Florence Nightingale Foundation.

=== Anti-Racism Award ===
In 2023 the RCN Foundation launched The Michelle Cox RCN Foundation Anti-Racism Award. This annual award is open to registered nurses and midwives across the UK, and is one of the few RCN Foundation awards restricted to RCN members. The aim is to fund projects that target transformation of unequal workplace relations that negatively impact individuals from the global majority. The award is a partnership between the RCN Foundation and Michelle Cox, a senior Black nurse from Liverpool who won a landmark case against the National Health Service for racial discrimination.

=== Research ===
In 2025 the Foundation funded a study to explore experiences of domestic abuse and the support needed by UK nursing and midwifery professionals.

== Fundraising ==
Funding continues to be provided through private donations, often from nurses themselves. In 2014 a nurse swam the English Channel, in 2016 nurses walked the West Highland Way (96 miles), whilst in 2023 a 102-year-old war veteran set a new Guinness World Record by abseiling 17 storeys down the Royal London Hospital to raise money for the RCN Foundation. In 2023 TikTok pledged £5m for the RCN Foundation coronavirus support fund.

Some joint fundraising ventures have been undertaken, such as climbing Mount Cavell in 2015 to raise funds for nurses in financial hardship which would be administered jointly through the Foundation and the Cavell Nurses' Trust.

Patrons included writer Christie Watson and RCNF Chair (c.2025) Jane Cummings.
