= Curve (film) =

- Official poster
- Directed by: Iain Softley
- Written by: Kimberly Lofstrom Johnson; Lee Patterson
- Produced by: Jason Blum; Julie Yorn; Jaume Collet-Serra
- Starring: Julianne Hough; Teddy Sears
- Cinematography: Brad Shield
- Edited by: Tariq Anwar
- Music by: Ed Shearmur
- Production companies: Blumhouse Productions; Ombra Films; LBI Entertainment
- Distributed by: Universal Pictures
- Release dates: August 31, 2015 (Film4 FrightFest); January 19, 2016 (United States)
- Running time: 86 minutes
- Country: United States
- Language: English

Curve is a 2015 American horror-thriller film directed by Iain Softley and written by Kimberly Lofstrom Johnson and Lee Patterson. It stars Julianne Hough and Teddy Sears. It was produced by Jason Blum for his Blumhouse Productions banner. The film had its world premiere at the Film4 FrightFest on August 31, 2015 and was released on January 19, 2016, through video on demand prior to be releasing on home media formats on February 2, 2016, by Universal Pictures.

== Plot ==
Mallory is a young bride-to-be on her way to Denver for her wedding rehearsal. She video chats with her sister, Ella, on her way there. Ella tells her that she hasn't bought her plane tickets yet because she wants to make sure Mallory is actually in love and happy with her decision. Mallory responds by telling her she is happy in a fake voice and hangs up. A few minutes later, her car breaks down. She tries calling AAA, but has no service.

While Mallory tries changing her clothes near the back of the car, she spots a man, Christian. She tells him her situation. He gets her car started for her and she starts to drive away but, out of guilt, stops and offers him a ride.

Along the way, he starts acting odd. He talks about how fate brought them together and it was meant to happen like this. He then tells her how she couldn't "deepthroat his huge cock". She stops and tells him to get out but he pulls out a knife and tells her to drive. She notices his seat belt is off and tries to kill him by speeding towards a guardrail near a curve. They crash violently. Mallory wakes up to find the car upside down. She unhooks her seat belt, but can't get out as her leg is pinned in the seat. Christian slowly wakes up and tells her she needs to get herself out of this one and leaves her.

Mallory puts on a hoodie and drinks the last bit of her water bottle. The following morning, Christian comes back and eats and drinks in front of her. He tells her how fate is a funny thing. That night, rats come in and slither around her. She kills one of them and eats a strip of its meat and drinks her own urine. Christian comes back and tells her how he's holding a family hostage. He then gives her a saw. At first, Mallory thinks he gave it to her to cut through the door, but he tells her he doesn't expect it to and how if she doesn't cut off her leg, she's going to die.

That night a huge rainstorm hits and Christian comes to say his goodbyes but she attacks him and throws his car keys outside to where he can't find them. A police car pulls up from the curve and the officer tells Christian he'll give him a ride. He hears Mallory's scream but thinks he's imagining things and drives away with Christian.

As the car starts to flood, Mallory starts trying to cut her leg off, but barely makes a few superficial cuts before her leg comes free due to the assistance of the flood. She goes to the cabin where Christian says he was. She witnesses him killing the police officer and sees that he has killed the homeowners but is keeping their daughter Katie as a hostage. Mallory aims a gun that she found and tells him that she will shoot him if he moves. He attacks Mallory as Katie flees. Mallory struggles with Christian before finally pushing him off of a second-story balcony. He falls and crushes his leg in a bear trap. She limps downstairs and gives him his knife and tells him that she is going to give him the same chance that he gave her. Christian succumbs to his wound and dies. Mallory limps down the road with Katie as the front door slams shut.

== Cast ==
- Julianne Hough as Mallory Rutledge
- Teddy Sears as Christian Laughton
- Penelope Mitchell as Ella Rutledge
- Madalyn Horcher as Katie Goldman
- Kurt Bryant as Katie's Father
- Drew Rausch as Deputy

== Production ==
In October 2013, it was announced that Ombra Films, Blumhouse Productions and LBI Entertainment would be teaming up to produce the film, with Iain Softley, from a screenplay by Kimberly Johnson, which was re-written by Lee Patterson, with Juan Sola and Erik Olsen executive producing, and Jason Blum producing through his Blumhouse Productions banner. That same day, it was announced that Julianne Hough had been cast in the film, as a young bride-to-be who is trapped in her car in a deserted highway. That same month, it was announced that Teddy Sears had been cast in the film, as a charming, predatory hitchhiker.

== Filming ==
Principal photography on the film commenced on October 22, 2013.

== Release ==
In September 2013, it was announced that Universal Pictures had acquired worldwide distribution rights to the film. The film had its world premiere at the Film4 FrightFest on August 31, 2015. The film was released on January 19, 2016, through video on demand prior to be releasing on home media formats on February 2, 2016.
