= Finn Elliot =

British actor

- Born: June 16, 2002 (age 24); Hong Kong
- Citizenship: British
- Education: University of Exeter (BA)
- Occupation: Actor
- Years active: 2015–2022
- Agent: Curtis Brown
- Notable work: The Crown; The Last Kingdom
- Parents: Giles Elliot (father); Mini Elliot (mother)
- Relatives: Archie Elliot (brother)

Finn Elliot (born 16 June 2002) is an English actor. He is best known for depicting a young Prince Philip in the Netflix drama The Crown and Young Uhtred in the Netflix drama The Last Kingdom.

== Early life ==
Elliot was born in Hong Kong in 2002 to parents Giles and Mini Elliot, both from Chichester, England, before the family moved to Kuala Lumpur, Malaysia one year later. Following this, Elliot spent much of his early life in Singapore where he attended the Tanglin Trust School. In 2009, Elliot's family returned to Chichester where he began attending the Oakwood School; while in Chichester, Elliot joined the Chichester Festival Youth Theatre where he began acting. Elliot later attended The Portsmouth Grammar School in Portsmouth, England during which he balanced school and acting.

== Career ==
Elliots first screen role was in the 2017 film The Outcast, in which he played a 10-year-old Lewis Aldridge, a young boy from the English countryside who witnessed his mother's drowning; in a later interview with his former school, Elliot described his experience filming the drowning scenes, which required him to use a SCUBA set, as well as the support he received from his castmates. Elliot would go on to feature in the 2017 film The Mercy and then the popular Netflix series The Crown, where he played a young Prince Philip in seasons 2 and 3; Elliot received fan acclaim in particular for his performance in season 2, where he portrayed the young prince attending the funeral of his sister, Princess Cecilie of Greece and Denmark. Later, Elliot would go on to portray Young Uhtred in the Netflix series The Last Kingdom.

== Filmography ==
=== Film ===
Year	Title	Role	Notes
2017	The Mercy	James Crowhurst	

=== Television ===
Year	Title	Role	Notes
2015	The Outcast	Young Lewis Aldridge	
2017–2019	The Crown	Young Prince Philip	Appears in 3 episodes
2020–2022	The Last Kingdom	Young Uhtred	Appears in 16 episodes
