= Gordon Burn =

English writer (1948-2009)

- Born: 16 January 1948; Newcastle upon Tyne, England
- Died: 17 July 2009 (aged 61); England
- Occupations: Journalist, novelist

Gordon Burn (16 January 1948 – 17 July 2009) was an English writer. Born in Newcastle upon Tyne, he authored four novels and several works of non-fiction.

== Career ==
After spending time in the USA with his cousin Eric Burdon, Gordon Burn’s first steps as a writer were for Radio Times and subsequently for the Sunday Times magazine, Rolling Stone and The Face. His interviewees included writers such as Barry Hines and Dennis Potter, entertainment personalities from Des O'Connor to Frank Muir, and sportsmen such as snooker player Alex Higgins – which led to Pocket Money (1986), his book about the British snooker scene. Using his journalistic experience of showbiz interviews, Burn's novels explore the issues of modern fame and faded celebrity as lived through the media spotlight. His novel Alma Cogan (1991), which imagined the future life of the British singer Alma Cogan had she not died in 1966, won the Whitbread Award for First Novel. His other novels, Fullalove and The North of England Home Service, were published in 1995 and 2003, respectively.

His non-fiction works deal primarily with sport and true crime. Burn's first book, Somebody's Husband, Somebody's Son, was a study of Peter Sutcliffe, 'the Yorkshire Ripper", and his 1998 book, Happy Like Murderers: The Story of Fred and Rosemary West, dealt in similar detail with two of Britain's most notorious serial killers.

Burn's interest in such infamous villains extended to his fiction, with Myra Hindley, one of the 'Moors murderers', featuring prominently in the novel Alma Cogan. His sport-based books consisted of Pocket Money: Inside the World of Snooker (1986) and Best and Edwards: Football, Fame and Oblivion (2006), the latter of which examines the twin stories of Manchester United footballers Duncan Edwards and George Best, and the "trajectory of two careers unmoored in wildly different ways."

He also wrote a book in conjunction with British artist Damien Hirst, On the Way to Work, a collection of interviews from various dates between 1992 and 2001. A regular contributor to The Guardian, his columns often focused on contemporary art.

=== Sex & Violence, Death & Silence ===
Sex & Violence, Death & Silence is a book written by Gordon Burn in 2009 and published by Faber & Faber. It contains selections of writing by Burn about art and artists (as well as art dealers and collectors) spanning almost thirty-five years, including interviews and reviews as well as extracts from his novel Alma Cogan. It opens with a foreword by Damien Hirst with David Peace.

Gordon Burn died in the summer of 2009, whilst the book was being prepared for publication.

The artists discussed in the book are as follows:

- Francis Bacon
- David Hockney
- Peter Blake
- Richard Smith
- Patrick Caulfield
- John Hoyland
- Gilbert and George
- Willem de Kooning

British art dealer Nigel Greenwood is also featured.

Nicholas Lezard described the work as being "knowledgeable, thorough and readable".

== Death ==
Gordon Burn died of bowel cancer in 2009, aged 61. In 2013, the Gordon Burn Prize was established in his honour.

== Bibliography ==
=== Fiction ===
- Alma Cogan (1991)
- Fullalove (1995)
- The North of England Home Service (2003)
- Born Yesterday: The News as a Novel (2008)

=== Non-fiction ===
- Somebody's Husband, Somebody's Son: The Story of Peter Sutcliffe (1984)
- Pocket Money: Inside The World of Snooker (1986) ISBN 978-0-434-09828-6
- Happy Like Murderers: The Story of Fred and Rosemary West (1998)
- On the Way to Work (with Damien Hirst) (2001)
- Best and Edwards: Football, Fame and Oblivion (2006)
- Sex & Violence, Death & Silence (2009)
