= Ruth Spalding =

Ruth Spalding (30 November 1913 – 26 February 2009) was an actor, director and author. She had a successful career in theater as actor and director, turned to writing television programming and worked in education, where she found time to research and write the life of the 17th-century parliamentarian and lawyer Bulstrode Whitelocke, for which she won a Whitbread prize in 1975.

== Career and personal life ==
Spalding was persuaded by Christopher Hill to edit Whitelocke's massive diary, covering the years 1605 to 1675, which was published by the British Academy. This involved her in journeys to France and Sweden, and long spells at Longleat, where the bulky Whitelocke archive survives. One reviewer described the first volume, which contained the diary and her commentary, as "a wondrous book". But a second volume was a still more heroic achievement, containing some thousand short biographies of Whitelocke's relations, friends and contacts.

Thereafter, she rejoiced in what she called her "deliciously unstructured life", finding her niche somehow in the theatre in the 1930s; in 1937 she was working at the Maddermarket Theatre in Norwich, and in 1939 she produced plays in London for the Religious Drama Society.

During the war she founded the Oxford Pilgrim Players, a co-operative company of actors. They claimed to play "any time anywhere", in Welsh miners' halls, schools, universities, once in a garage, in a hospital, in converted stables, in the crypt of St Paul's Cathedral, and in East End air-raid shelters. The Pilgrim Players were then incorporated into the Rock Theatre Company, in which Spalding and her husband, Terence O'Brien, both became leading actors and directors. Their performances were acclaimed in glowing terms in the press when Ruth played Ophelia in Hamlet and Portia in The Merchant of Venice, and her husband Shylock, Macbeth and Malvolio. They acted in the plays of Strindberg and George Bernard Shaw; their performances took them to the Comedy Theatre in London, and St Martin-in-the-Fields church; Spalding directed a play in the Regent's Park Open Air Theatre, and they played scenes from Shakespeare in Wakefield gaol.

After the war, and with the advent of television, life was more difficult for a touring company, and Spalding moved into education, lecturing, arranging conferences and exhibitions, advising the National Union of Townswomen's Guilds on arts, crafts and social studies. Charles Williams, the poet and playwright, had lodged in the house of Spalding's parents during the war, and became a close friend to and her sister Anne; she wrote a radio programme about him in 1961.

She wrote many BBC feature programmes, and her documentary play on the women's movement, With This Sword (written under the name of Marion Jay), was performed with choir and orchestra at the Royal Festival Hall during the Festival of Britain in 1951. For 14 years, she was general secretary of the Association of Headmistresses, finally retiring to devote herself to full-time writing, plus very active participation in the life of her family, her church and village. At times Ruth's unstructured career posed problems of earning her daily bread, but she was always resourceful and optimistic, a most loving mother to her daughter, Jeanie, and grandmother to her two grandchildren, Ruth and Daniel. She retained remarkable energy and youthfulness into her last years, directing plays in her seventies and eighties, relishing travel in faraway places, and gardening organically at home. While she astonished me with her success in locating some of Whitelocke's obscure contemporaries, she also filled me with envy at her luxuriant bed of parsley at Welwyn. She was a sparkling, lively model of the career opportunities that have come to women in the 20th century.

== Books ==
- Contemporaries of Bulstrode Whitelocke, 1605–1675: Biographies (1990)
- The Improbable Puritan: A Life of Bulstrode Whitelocke (1975)
- The Diary Of Bulstrode Whitelocke 1605 1675 (1990)
