= Michael Cox (novelist) =

English writer and editor

- Born: 25 October 1948
- Died: 31 March 2009 (aged 60)
- Spouse: Desda Crockett
- Children: one daughter; two stepchildren
- Writing career
- Notable work: The Meaning of Night

Michael Andrew Cox (1948–2009) was an English writer and editor.

== Biography ==
Michael Cox was born on 25 October 1948 to parents who worked in the footwear industry. Michael Cox attended Wellingborough Grammar School (now known as Wrenn School), later graduating from St. Catharine's College, Cambridge in 1971. He studied English and had intended to be an academic, but he instead signed a contract with the record-publishing group EMI, making two albums and several singles early in the decade under the pseudonym Matthew Ellis on the Regal Zonophone label. He also subsequently recorded an album for DJM and singles for various labels as Obie Clayton.

Cox dedicated both of his novels to Dizzy Crockett, whom he married in 1973. They later had a daughter. In 1977, he joined Thorsons Publishing Group (later part of HarperCollins). Cox's first book was a biography of M. R. James, a Victorian ghost story writer, and this was published in 1983 by Oxford University Press. Between 1983 and 1997, he compiled and edited several anthologies of Victorian short stories for Oxford University Press, the first two co-edited by R. A. Gilbert.

In 1989 Cox joined Oxford University Press, where he became senior commissioning editor and there completed encyclopaedic work: compiling A Dictionary of Writers and their Works (1991) and The Oxford Chronology of English Literature (2002). His first novel, The Meaning of Night, was published in 2006 and was shortlisted for the 2006 Costa first novel award. Inspired by authors such as Charles Dickens (a childhood favorite), Wilkie Collins, and Mary Elizabeth Braddon, this thriller novel is set both in a dirty, corrupting 1850s London, and Evenwood, an idyllic country estate—both equally full of mysteries. It was followed by a sequel, The Glass of Time, set twenty years later.

== Medical issues ==
In 1992 Cox noticed that he had breathing difficulties and it was discovered that he had an unusual tumour in his left nostril. This was treated, but during his five-year check-up, a further tumour was noted on his pituitary gland. In April 2004, he began to lose his sight as a result of a rare vascular cancer, haemangiopericytoma. In preparation for surgery he was prescribed the steroidal drug dexamethasone, one of the effects of which was to initiate a temporary burst of mental and physical energy. This, combined with the stark realization that his blindness might return if the treatment wasn't successful, spurred Michael finally to begin writing in earnest the novel that he had been contemplating for over thirty years, and which up to then had only existed as a random collection of notes, drafts, and discarded first chapters. Following surgery, work continued on what is now The Meaning of Night, and in January 2005, after a hotly contested UK auction, it was sold to John Murray (a subdivision of Hodder Headline) for £430,000. Michael Cox died of cancer on 31 March 2009.

== Anthologies Edited ==
- The Oxford Book of English Ghost Stories (with R. A. Gilbert), 1986.
- Casting the Runes and Other Ghost Stories (by M.R. James), 1987.
- Victorian Ghost Stories: An Oxford Anthology (with R. A. Gilbert), 1991 (vt. The Oxford Book of Victorian Ghost Stories, 2003).
- The Oxford Book of Historical Stories (with Jack Adrian), 1994.
- The Oxford Book of Twentieth-Century Ghost Stories, 1996.
- Twelve Tales of the Supernatural, 1997.
- Twelve Victorian Ghost Stories, 1997.
