= Something Like a House =

British writer Sid Smith's debut novel, first published in 2001

- Author: Sid Smith
- Language: English
- Publisher: Picador
- Publication date: 2001

Something Like a House is British writer Sid Smith's debut novel, first published in 2001. The novel, set in China, was awarded the James Tait Black Memorial Prize and the Whitbread First Novel Award. When Smith wrote the novel he had never travelled to China and most of the background of the book was gleaned from researches done in the British Library.

== Plot synopsis ==
Jim Fraser, a British soldier who takes part in the Korean War, deserts and after surrendering himself to the Chinese army, finds himself billeted to a Miao village, working under the supervision of village elder, Old Tao. Unable to communicate much because of the language barrier, he spends some 35 years there, undergoing, amongst other things, the Cultural Revolution and bullying by the Red Guards, in the meantime bringing up a little girl who later becomes the victim of experimental biological warfare.
