= August (Woodward novel) =

2001 novel by Gerard Woodward

- First edition
- Author: Gerard Woodward
- Cover artist: Patti Ratchford
- Language: English
- Series: Aldous Jones trilogy
- Release number: 1
- Genre: Fiction
- Set in: London; Wales
- Publisher: Chatto & Windus, W. W. Norton & Company
- Publication date: October 1, 2001
- Publication place: England
- Media type: Print
- Pages: 320
- ISBN: 978-0-393-33271-1
- Dewey Decimal: 823.914
- LC Class: PR6073.O634A97
- Followed by: I'll Go to Bed at Noon

August (2001), is the first novel by author Gerard Woodward. It was shortlisted for Whitbread Book Award (2001).

== Plot introduction ==
Set from the mid-1950s till 1971, the book tells the story of the Jones family, who leave their home in London for a camping holiday in Wales every August.
