= Sid Smith (novelist) =

English novelist and journalist (born 1949)

Sid Smith (born c. 1949) is an English novelist poet and journalist.

== Life and career ==
Smith was born in Preston, Lancashire. For seven years he worked in labouring jobs, including dustman, gardener, gravedigger and construction worker. Since then he has hitch-hiked 9,000 miles around the US, lived in Italy and Greece, and acquired a pilot's licence for paragliders.

Smith came late to literary prominence. He had been a journalist for 17 years, including two years as a sub-editor on The Times, and was already in his 50s when his debut novel Something Like A House was published in 2001. The tale of a British deserter in China at the time of the Cultural Revolution, Something Like a House won critical praise and went on to win both the James Tait Black Memorial Prize and the Whitbread First Novel Award. What was remarkable about the book was its meticulous evocation of time and place, especially since Smith had never been to China and had written the book entirely from his own research, conducted among other places in the British Library. Smith says that his only previous contact with China had been a "one-hour stopover at Hong Kong airport". He claims that "the only ticket you need is a library ticket". However, his novels portray the gritty details of manual labour, about which he may claim to be knowledgeable.

Smith's second novel, A House by the River (2003), was another adventure story set in China. His third, China Dreams (2007), has the theme of a Londoner who is obsessed with China but has never been there.

Smith is a sub-editor on The Times.

His website at http://www.sidsmith.co.uk/index.htm is constantly updated with short stories, journalism and poetry.

== Private life ==
Smith was married with full Shinto rites to Chieko Nomura at a shrine in Southern Japan. He lives in Islington in north London.

== Notable works ==
- Something Like a House, Picador 2001
- A House by the River, Picador 2003
- China Dreams, Pan Macmillan 2007

Nisbet Chronicles

- Nisbet and Trafalgar, Kindle Edition
- Nisbet and Nelson's Eye (work in progress)

== Other writings ==
Smith is also a poet and short story writer on a variety of topics.

== Awards ==
Whitbread First Novel Award 2001 - Something Like a House

James Tait Black Memorial Prize 2001 - Something Like a House

Encore Award Nominee 2004 - A House by the River
