= Suzanne Cleminshaw =

American writer based in Britain

Suzanne Cleminshaw is an American writer based in Britain.

== Biography ==
Her book, The Great Ideas, was shortlisted for the First Novel category at the 1999 Whitbread Awards.

She studied creative writing at the University of East Anglia.

She is Buzz Aldrin's niece.
