= Alma Cogan (novel) =

Book by Gordon Burn

- First edition, with quote from William Boyd
- Author: Gordon Burn
- Cover artist: Chris Shamwana
- Language: English
- Publisher: Secker and Warburg
- Publication date: 1991
- Publication place: United Kingdom
- Media type: Print (Hardback & Paperback)
- Pages: 210
- ISBN: 0-436-20009-0
- OCLC: 53912263

Alma Cogan (ISBN 978-0-571-22284-1) is a 1991 novel by Gordon Burn, reprinted in 2004. It was Burn's first novel and won the Whitbread Book Award in 1991. In the UK it was published in 1991 with the title Alma Cogan. In the US, it was initially published as Alma.

In real life, Alma Cogan was a well-known British light pop singer of the 1950s and early 1960s, known as "The Girl with the Giggle in Her Voice." A friend of the Beatles and many other pop acts of the era, Cogan died of cancer in 1966 at the age of 34.

== Plot summary ==
In Burn's novel, Alma Cogan does not die in 1966, but retires from show business sometime thereafter to a quiet solitude near the English seashore, living neither in luxury nor poverty. In contrast to Cogan's bubbly public persona, Burn's Alma, who narrates the book from 1986, is an arch, dry-witted, highly intelligent observer of the world around her, mildly dismissive of, even jaded by, her showbiz past (but not entirely disdainful of it). She recounts with equal detachment the heady days of celebrity and the sordid backstage cruelties—including bouts of unexpected violence—as she muses on the nature of stardom and its many pitfalls, which entrap the worshipper as much as the worshipped. But her residual fame proves a gruesome and unwanted relic as it serves to tie her, through her fans, to an unforeseen encounter with evil.

== Based on 'true' events ==
With the exception of Cogan's non-death in 1966, Alma Cogan is based largely on true events and real people.
