= Gerard Woodward =

British novelist, poet and short story writer

- Born: 4 December 1961 (age 64); Enfield, London, England
- Education: London School of Economics (BSc), University of Greenwich (CertEd), University of Manchester (PgD)
- Writing career
- Notable work: August (2001); I'll Go to Bed at Noon (2004)
- Notable awards: Somerset Maugham Award (1992); Jerwood Fiction Uncovered Prize (2014)

Gerard Woodward (born 4 December 1961 in Enfield, London) is a British novelist, poet and short story writer, best known for his trilogy of novels concerning the troubled Jones family, the second of which, I'll Go to Bed at Noon, was shortlisted for the 2004 Man Booker Prize. As of April 2024, he is a professor of creative writing at Bath Spa University.

== Early life and education ==
Woodward was born in Enfield, London on 4 December 1961 to Reginald L. and Sylvia Woodward (née Walsh). He had four younger siblings. In 1981, his brother Francis died after being struck by a train while drunk. His mother died shortly after.

Woodward attended St Ignatius College, a Jesuit comprehensive school, leaving at 16 to work for two years in a variety of jobs. He later studied painting at Falmouth School of Art in Cornwall, though dropped out in his second year. Woodward ultimately received a Bachelor of Science Honours in social anthropology from London School of Economics, a Certificate in Education from the University of Greenwich, and a postgraduate diploma in social anthropology from the University of Manchester. In 2019, Woodward received an Honorary Doctorate from Middlesex University.

== Career ==
In 1989, Woodward won a Eric Gregory Award for poets under 30. He published his first poetry collection, Householder, in 1991; it won the year's Somerset Maugham Award. His later poetry collections include After the Deafening (1994); Island to Island (1999); We Were Pedestrians (2005); and The Seacunny (2012). In 2001, he published his first novel, August, which was the first in a trilogy, followed by I'll Go to Bed at Noon (2004) and A Curious Earth (2007). August was shortlisted for the 2001 Whitbread Award, and I'll Go to Bed at Noon was shortlisted for the Booker Prize. Woodward has since published the short story collection Caravan Thieves (2008) and the novels Nourishment (2010) and Vanishing (2014).

Woodward has been a writer-in-residence at Columbia College Chicago (2011) and the Stockholm University (2013). He has taught or been a writer in residence in many countries including China, Greece, Sweden, Slovenia and Ireland. Since 2004, Woodward has worked in the creative writing department at Bath Spa University; as of April 2024, he runs the Ph.D. programme with Tracy Brain. He has been a fellow of the Royal Society of Literature since 2005.

== Awards and honors ==
In 1989, Woodward won the Eric Gregory Award for poets under age 30. He received an Arts Council England bursary for poetry in 1994 and for fiction in 1999. He has been a fellow of the Royal Society of Literature since 2005.

Householder (1991) and After The Deafening (1994) have been Poetry Book Society Choice books.

Awards for Woodward's writing
Year	Title	Award	Result	Ref.
1992	Householder	Somerset Maugham Award	Winner	
1992	Householder	John Llewellyn-Rhys Memorial Prize		
1994	After the Deafening	T. S. Eliot Prize	Shortlist	
2001	August	Whitbread Award for First Novel	Shortlist	
2004	I'll Go to Bed at Noon	Man Booker Prize for Fiction	Shortlist	
2004		Encore Award	Shortlist	
2005	We Were Pedestrians	T. S. Eliot Prize	Shortlist	
2011		Sunday Times EFG Private Bank Short Story Award	Shortlist	
2014	Vanishing	Jerwood Fiction Uncovered Prize	Winner	
2017		O. Henry Award		
2018	The Paper Lovers	Bad Sex in Fiction	Shortlist	

== Personal life ==
Woodward met his wife Suzanne Jane Anderson while studying at Falmouth School of Art. He has two children: Corin and Phoebe.

== Bibliography ==
=== Poetry ===
- The Unwriter & Other Poems (1989)
- Householder (1991), ISBN 0-7011-3758-4
- After the Deafening (1994), ISBN 0-7011-6271-6
- Island to Island (1999), ISBN 0-7011-6869-2
- We Were Pedestrians (2005), ISBN 0-7011-7887-6
- The Seacunny (2012)
- The Vulture (2022)

=== Fiction ===
- August (2001), ISBN 0-7011-7111-1
- I'll Go to Bed at Noon (2004), ISBN 0-7011-7118-9
- A Curious Earth (2007)
- Caravan Thieves (short stories; 2008)
- Nourishment (2010; published as Letters from an Unknown Woman in the US)
- Vanishing (2014)
- Legoland (short stories; 2016), ISBN 978-1447288671
- The Paper Lovers (2018)
