= The Meaning of Night =

2006 novel by Michael Cox

- First edition
- Author: Michael Cox
- Language: English
- Genre: crime novel
- Publisher: John Murray
- Publication date: 7 September 2006
- Publication place: United Kingdom
- Media type: Print (Hardcover)
- Pages: 608 pp.
- ISBN: 0-7195-6835-8
- OCLC: 67374720

The Meaning of Night is the debut novel by author Michael Cox. Cox's book is a 600-page crime thriller novel set in Victorian England. It was one of four books picked for the shortlist for the Costa Book Awards prize for the debut novel of 2006, losing out to Stef Penney's The Tenderness of Wolves, which went on to win the overall award for best novel of 2006.

== Plot summary ==
Beginning on a cold October night in 1854 England, in a dark passageway, the book's narrator tracks an innocent man whom he does not know and stabs him to death. The protagonist/narrator, Edward Glyver, then takes the reader back, recounting as a confession his tale of deceit, love, and revenge. Glyver reveals the torment he has suffered at the hands of his rival, the poet-criminal Phoebus Rainsford Daunt, and why in pursuit of revenge Glyver (now masquerading as Edward Glapthorn), a book lover and scholar, has turned to murder. The story moves between the foggy London streets and the enchanting country manor house Evenwood where Daunt spent his formative years, a place with which Glyver finds he has a special connection. The Glass of Time, the follow-up novel to The Meaning of Night, further examines the consequences of Edward Glyver's crime, in a setting twenty years after The Meaning of Night.

== Publication and reception ==
The book's purchase by London publisher John Murray caused a stir in the publishing world for winning the largest ever British auction for a debut novel; Cox was reportedly paid an advance of £500,000. The deal was followed closely by industry magazines like The Bookseller.

The novel received primarily favourable reviews, albeit with notable exceptions, for example one review in The Daily Telegraph, which dismissed the book as "substandard, ersatz hokum."

== Principal characters ==
Edward Charles Glyver (a.k.a. Edward Glapthorn, Edward Duport, Ernest Geddington) the principal character. Son of Julius Verney Duport, 25th Baron Tansor and his first wife, Laura Duport née Fairmile, but raised by Simona Glyver. Lord Tansor never learns of his son's existence. Edward is a precocious student, especially interested in literature and the new science of photography, but he is dismissed from Eton College after being framed for theft by his former friend, Phoebus Daunt.

Phoebus Rainsford Daunt the son of Dr. Achilles Brabazon Daunt and his first wife, Elizabeth. Although Dr. Daunt is an avid scholar, Phoebus is heavily influenced by his stepmother and becomes insinuating and proud. Phoebus becomes a replacement son for Lord Tansor, and eventually his heir. Phoebus lives expensively in London and apparently makes his living as a poet of popular historical epics, but is also involved in forgery and bank fraud.

Emily Grace Carteret the daughter of Paul Carteret and the first cousin, once removed, of Lord Tansor. Emily spent several years in France, where she became good friends with Marie-Madeleine Buisson. During the main action of the book, Emily is nearly 30 years old and unmarried because she is secretly engaged to Phoebus Daunt, of whom her father does not approve.

== Themes and motifs ==
- Fate (which Edward calls "The Iron Master")
- Bibliography
- Opium and prostitution in Victorian London
- The legal profession in Victorian London

== Bibliographic information ==
- Cox, Michael, 1948-2009 The Meaning of Night : A Confession / Michael Cox. 1st ed. New York : W.W. Norton, 2006. ISBN 0-393-06203-1 (U.S. edition)
