= Sadie Jones =

English writer and novelist (born 1967)

- Born: 1967 (age 58–59); London, England
- Education: Godolphin and Latymer School; Bath Technical College
- Occupation: Writer
- Years active: 1990–present
- Notable work: The Outcast; Small Wars; The Uninvited Guests; Fallout; The Snakes; Amy & Lan
- Spouse: Tim Boyd (m. 2000)
- Children: 2
- Parents: Evan Jones; Joanna Jones
- Relatives: Melissa Jones

Sadie Jones (born 1967) is an English writer and novelist best known for her award-winning debut novel, The Outcast (2008).

== Early years ==
Jones was raised in London, the daughter of Evan Jones, a Jamaican-born poet and scriptwriter, who worked with director Joseph Losey on several projects, and Joanna Jones, an actor. Born and brought up in World's End, a district in Chelsea, Sadie Jones was educated at the Godolphin and Latymer School, and Bath Technical College.

After leaving school, Jones worked in video production and as a waitress, and travelled, before moving to Paris, France, where she wrote the first of four unproduced scripts and a play, among other things, before her debut novel, The Outcast, was published in 2008.

== Novels ==
The Outcast was short-listed for the 2008 Orange Prize. It was a Sunday Times Number 1 Bestseller and won the Best First Novel in the Costa Book Awards of 2008. It has been translated into twelve languages and sold more than 500,000 copies. The first episode of a two part TV adaptation of The Outcast, written by Jones, directed by Iain Softley, was broadcast on BBC1 on Sunday 12 July 2015. Writing in UK newspaper The Guardian, Julia Raeside said: "Sadie Jones risked smashing a perfect thing when she signed up to adapt her book The Outcast (BBC1, Sunday) for television. The novel, one of my favourites, bursts with a fragile intensity that, while filmic, seemed unlikely to survive the transition", before concluding: "Every character uses a tenth of the words another writer might employ, because it's all there. No need for prodding and over-talking. The tone set by Iain Softley’s beautifully restrained direction and the careful use of music creates a real feeling of loss from the start, just as in the book, but he somehow avoids all hammy visual foreshadowing and narrative signposting, so often used to gee a plot along." The second episode was broadcast a week later, on 19 July 2015. Critical reception was mixed, but the BBC's adaptation of The Outcast received a rating of 7.7/10 (from 502 users) on the Internet Movie Database (IMDb).

Jones's second novel, Small Wars, set in 1956 Cyprus and inspired by the war in Afghanistan, was published at the end of August 2009. Her third novel, The Uninvited Guests, was published in March 2012. Set in the fading grandeur of an Edwardian country house, it is a darkly humorous, unsettling and ghostly tale, ("...a shimmering comedy of manners and disturbing commentary on class...a brilliant novel"). Her fourth novel, Fallout (May 2014), was set in the London of the 1970s, and described as "intoxicating and immersive" by the Sunday Times. The Snakes, her fifth novel, was published in March 2019 in the UK, and June 2019 in the United States. It was described in The Guardian by Elizabeth Lowry as "A serious investigation of avarice and justice, wrapped in the rhythms of a thriller", while Alice O'Keefe, in The Bookseller, wrote: "I was expecting this to be good. But, I have to tell you, I was awestruck... I may not read a better book this year." Her sixth novel, Amy & Lan, was published on 7 July 2022.

== Personal life ==
Sadie Jones married the architect Tim Boyd in 2000, they have two children.

== Bibliography ==
Year	Title	Publisher	ISBN	Published	Pages	Note
2008	The Outcast	Chatto & Windus	978-0-701-18175-8	07-Feb-2008	352	Shortlisted for the Orange Prize Won Best First Novel in the Costa Book Awards
2009	Small Wars	Chatto & Windus	978-0-701-18455-1	27-Aug-2009	384	
2012	The Uninvited Guests	Chatto & Windus	978-0-701-18671-5	22-Mar-2012	272	
2014	Fallout	Chatto & Windus	978-0-701-18850-4	01-May-2014	416	
2019	The Snakes	Chatto & Windus	978-1-784-74255-3	07-Mar-2019	448	
2022	Amy & Lan	Chatto & Windus	978-1-784-74481-6	07-Jul-2022	320	
