= Protection racket =

Systematic extortion disguised as a security agreement

A protection racket is a racketeering scheme, usually perpetrated by a criminal organization, that coerces payments on a regular basis from an individual, group, or business in exchange for agreeing to not harm them (or for purportedly "protecting" them). The threat of harm may be indirectly communicated or implied, and it may include violence, robbery, ransacking, arson, vandalism, etc. The payments are called "protection money" or a "protection fee". An organized crime group determines an affordable fee by negotiating with each of its payers to help ensure a consistent and punctual payment. Protection rackets can vary in terms of their levels of sophistication or organization. A protection racket is a form of extortion in which the racketeer manufactures the threat from which protection is then sold.

The perpetrators of a protection racket may protect vulnerable targets from other dangerous individuals and groups or may simply offer to refrain from themselves carrying out attacks on the targets, and usually both of these forms of protection are implied in the racket. Due to the frequent implication that the racketeers may contribute to harming the target upon failure to pay, the protection racket is generally considered a form of extortion. In some instances, the main potential threat to the target may be caused by the same group that offers to solve it in return for payment, but that fact may sometimes be concealed in order to ensure continual patronage and funding of the crime syndicate by the coerced party. In other cases, depending on the perpetrators' level of influence with authorities and the legality or legal status of the business or target being protected, protection rackets may also offer protection against law enforcement and police involvement, especially if the perpetrators bribe or threaten local law enforcement.

The protection racket mostly sells physical security. Through the credible threat of violence, the racketeers deter both third-party criminals and people in their own criminal organization from swindling, robbing, injuring, sabotaging, or otherwise harming their clients. The racket often occurs in situations and places where criminal threats to certain businesses, entities, or individuals are not effectively prevented or addressed by the prevailing system of law and order or governance, or in cases of inadequate protection by the law for certain ethnic or socioeconomic groups. Protection rackets tend to form in markets in which the law enforcement cannot be counted on to provide legal protection, because of incompetence (as in weak, corrupt, or failed states), illegality (when the targeted entity is involved in black markets), and/or because forms of government distrust exist among the entities involved. Hence, protection rackets are common in places or territories where criminal organizations resemble de facto authorities, or parallel governments. Sicily, Italy is a prominent example of this phenomenon, where the Cosa Nostra collects protection money locally and resembles a de facto authority, or a parallel government.

Protection rackets are often indistinguishable in practice from extortion rackets, and generally distinguishable from social service and private security by the degree of implied threat; the racketeers themselves may threaten and attack businesses, technological infrastructure, and citizens if the payments are not made. A distinction is possible between a "pure" extortion protection racket, in which the racketeers might agree only not to attack a business or entity, and a broader protection racket offering some real private security in addition to such extortion. In either case, the racketeers generally agree to defend a business or individual from any attack by either themselves or third parties (other criminal gangs). In reality, the distinction between the two types of protection rackets is dubious, because in either case extortion racketeers may have to defend their clients against rival gangs to maintain their profits. By corollary, criminal gangs may have to maintain control of territories (turfs), as local businesses may collapse if forced to pay for protection from too many rackets, which then hurts all parties involved.

Certain scholars, such as Diego Gambetta, classify criminal organizations engaged in protection racketeering as "mafia", as the racket is popular with both the Sicilian Mafia and Italian-American Mafia.

== Overview ==
A protection racket is an operation where racketeers provide protection to persons and properties, settle disputes and enforce contracts in markets where the police and judicial system cannot be relied upon.

Diego Gambetta's The Sicilian Mafia (1996) and Federico Varese's The Russian Mafia (2001) define the mafia as a type of organized crime group that specializes in the provision of private protection.

Protection racketeers or mafia groups operate mostly in the black market, providing buyers and sellers the security they need for smooth transactions; but empirical data collected by Gambetta and Varese suggests that mafia groups are able to offer private protection to corporations and individuals in legal markets when the state fails to offer sufficient and efficient protection to the people in need. Two elements distinguish racketeers from legal security firms. The first element is their willingness to deploy violent forms of retribution (going as far as murder) that fall outside the limits the law normally extends to civilian security firms. The other element is that racketeers are willing to involve themselves in illegal markets.

Recent studies show that mafia groups or gangs are not the only form of protection racket or extra-legal protector, and another important form of protection racket is corrupt networks consisting of public officials, especially those from criminal justice agencies. For example, Wang's The Chinese Mafia (2017) examines protection rackets in China and suggests two types of extra-legal protectors, namely the Black Mafia (local gangs) and the Red Mafia (networks of corrupt government officials). Wang's narrative suggests that local gangs are quasi-law enforcers in both legal and illegal markets, and corrupt public officials are extra-legal protectors, safeguarding local gangs, protecting illegal entrepreneurs in the criminal underworld, offering protection to businesspeople, and selling public appointments to buyers.

== Territorial monopolies ==
A protection racketeer cannot tolerate competition within his sphere of influence from another racketeer. If a dispute erupted between two clients (e.g. businessmen competing for a construction contract) who are protected by rival racketeers, the two racketeers would have to fight each other to win the dispute for their respective clients. The outcomes of such fights can be unpredictable, and neither racketeer would be able to guarantee a victory for his client. This would make their protection unreliable and of little value; their clients would likely dismiss them and settle the dispute by other means. Therefore, racketeers negotiate territories in which they can monopolize the use of violence in settling disputes. These territories may be geographical, or they may be a certain type of business or form of transaction.

== Providing genuine protection ==
Sometimes racketeers will warn other criminals that the client is under their protection and that they will punish anyone who harms the client. Services that the racketeers may offer may include the recovery of stolen property or punishing vandals. The racketeers may even advance the interests of the client by forcing out (or otherwise hindering or intimidating) unprotected competitors.

Protection from theft and vandalism is one service the racketeer may offer. For instance, in Sicily, mafiosi know thieves and fences in their territory, and can track down stolen goods and punish thieves who attack their clients.

Protection racketeers establish what they hope will be indefinitely long bonds with their clients. This allows the racketeers to publicly declare a client to be under their protection. Thus, thieves and other predators will have little confusion as to who is and is not protected.

Protection racketeers are not necessarily criminals. In A Short History of Progress, Ronald Wright notes on p. 49, "The warrior caste, supposedly society's protectors, often become protection racketeers. In times of war or crisis, power is easily stolen from the many by the few on a promise of security. The more elusive or imaginary the foe, the better for manufacturing consent."

== Examples ==
- Danegeld was a protection tax paid by Christendom to stop Viking raids.
- During the late medieval and early modern era in the Scottish Marches, local farmers would often need to make payments to the Border Reivers as a form of protection money to ensure they were not attacked. These agreements were called "Black mal", where "mal" was an Old Norse word meaning agreement. The word blackmail entered the English language in 1530 as a result, but the word's meaning has changed since.
- Many early Islamic empires levied a tax upon non-Muslims in return for protection and an exemption from compulsory military service. There is no record of the tax being imposed by a nation after the late 1800s.
- In Melbourne, Australia, Alphonse Gangitano ran a protection racket along the famous Lygon Street during the 1990s.
- In Sicily, Italy, officials say that 80% of businesses in the city of Palermo pay pizzo, or protection money, to the Sicilian Mafia.
- In Ciudad Juárez, Mexico, when the Mexican drug war escalated in 2008, criminal groups like the Juárez Cartel saw their financial backbone threatened and began asking for protection money from businesses ranging from convenience stores to clubs and restaurants with the threat of burning down the business or shooting everyone inside with machine guns.
- In the early history of post-Soviet Russia, law enforcement was too underfunded and poorly trained to protect businesses and enforce contracts. Most businesses had to join a protection racket (known as a krysha, the Russian word for "roof") run by local gangsters.
- In the United Kingdom in the 1950s and 60s the Kray twins ran protection rackets in the East End of London.
- Chauth, demanded by Sambhaji and Peshvas during Mahratta Invasions of Bengal and Mahratta Sackings of Goa and Bombay-Bassein.
- The Brazilian militias represent a paradigmatic case of protection racket. Militiamen are usually public security agents or former agents who organize to exploit power vacuums left by state and municipal governments throughout the country. Protection rackets became a multimillionaire segment of organized crime closely tied with high-profile politicians as well as institutional leadership of both public and private sectors.

== See also ==
- Abusive power and control
- Bribe Payers Index
- Bid rigging
- Blat (favors)
- Conflict of interest
- Extortion
- Financial abuse
- Foreign Corrupt Practices Act
- Influence peddling
- Jury tampering
- Lobbying
- Match fixing
- Money trail - Money loop
- Organized crime
- Pay to play
- Pizzo (extortion)
- Political corruption
- Principal–agent problem
- Privateer
- Racket (crime)
- Revolutionary tax
- Taxation as theft
- Taxation of the Jews in Europe
- Transparency International
- Triad (organized crime)
- Tribute
