= Progress trap =

Creation of new problems with progress

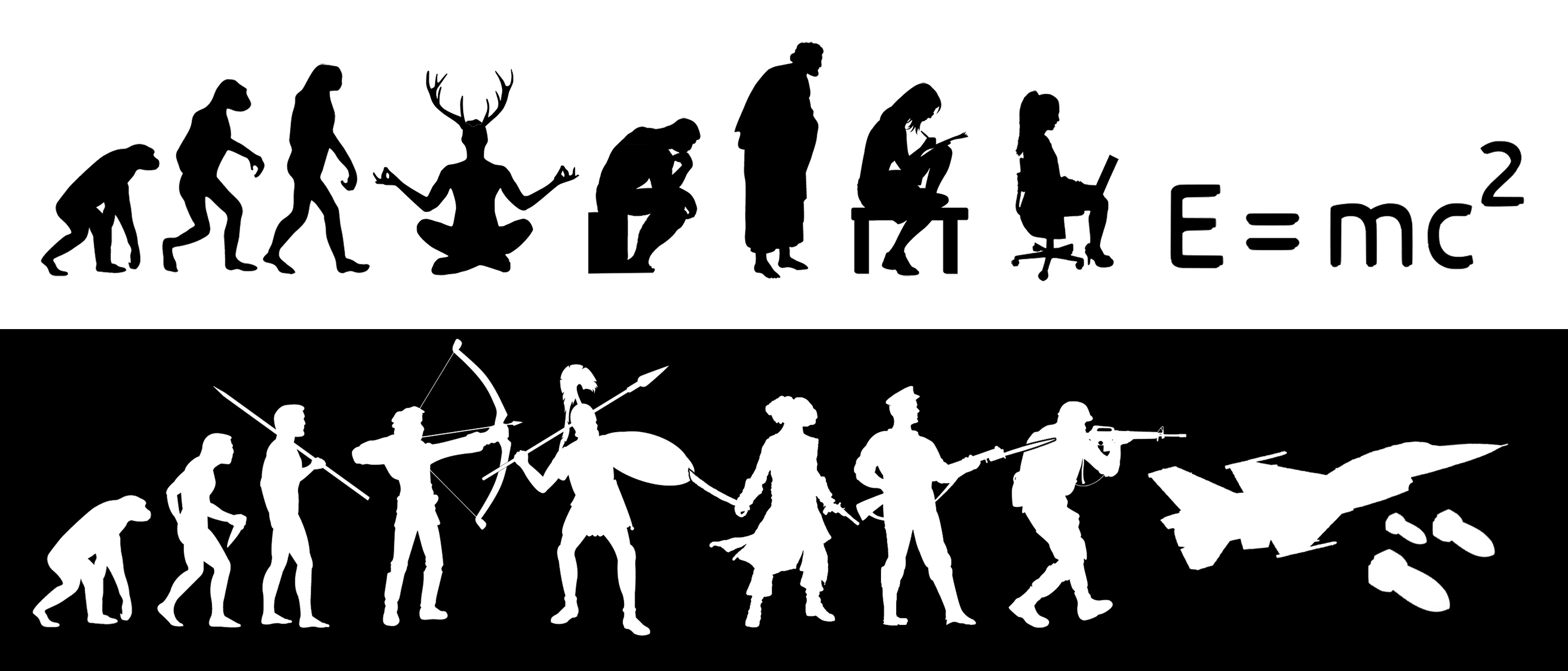
In pursuing progress through human ingenuity, societies inadvertently introduce new problems.

A progress trap is the condition human societies experience when, in pursuing progress through human ingenuity, they inadvertently introduce problems that they do not have the resources or the political will to solve for fear of short-term losses in status, stability or quality of life. This prevents further progress and sometimes leads to societal collapse.

The term "progress trap" has been utilized since at least May 1975, when the TimesDaily newspaper of Florence, Alabama, featured an article on the Brazilian government finding itself caught between economic development and ecological health. A decade later, on August 16, 1985, an article by James David Barber for The Bryan Times featured the term.

Walter Von Krämer discussed the issue in a medical context through a series of articles published in 1989 in Der Spiegel. In 1990, Daniel Brian O'Leary conducted an independent study on the behavioral aspects of the condition, which he detailed in his paper.

The term later gained attention after the historian and novelist Ronald Wright's 2004 book and Massey Lecture series A Short History of Progress in which he sketches world history so far as a succession of progress traps. With the documentary film version of Wright's book Surviving Progress backed by Martin Scorsese and The National Film Board of Canada the concept achieved wider recognition.

== A Short History of Progress - Overview ==
While the idea is not new, Wright identifies the central problem as one of scale and political will. According to him, the error is often to extrapolate from what appears to work well on a small scale to a larger scale, which depletes natural resources and causes environmental degradation. Large-scale implementation also tends to be subject to diminishing returns. As overpopulation, erosion, greenhouse gas emissions, or other consequences become apparent, society is destabilized.

In a progress trap, those in positions of authority are unwilling to make changes necessary for future survival. To do so they would need to sacrifice their current status and political power at the top of a hierarchy. They may also be unable to raise public support and the necessary economic resources, even if they try. Deforestation and erosion in ancient Greece may be an example of the latter.

A new source of natural resources can provide a reprieve. The European discovery and exploitation of the "New World" is one example of this, but it seems unlikely to be repeated today. Present global civilization has covered the planet to such an extent there are no new resources in sight. Wright concludes that if not averted by some other means, collapse will be on a global scale, if or when it comes. Current economic crises, population problems, and global climate change are symptoms that highlight the interdependence of current national economies and ecologies.

The problem has deep historical roots, probably dating back to the origins of life on Earth 3.8 billion years ago. In the Late Pleistocene, improved hunting techniques in vulnerable areas caused the extinction of many large prey species, leaving the enlarged populace without an adequate food supply. The only apparent alternative, agriculture, was also a progress trap. Salination, deforestation, erosion, and urban sprawl led to disease and malnutrition.

Almost any sphere of technology can prove to be a progress trap, as in the example of medicine and its possibly inadequate response to the drawbacks of the high-density agricultural practices (e.g. factory farming) it has enabled. Wright uses weapon technology gradually reaching the threat of total nuclear destruction to illustrate this point. Ultimately, Wright strives to counter at least the Victorian notion of "modernity" as unconditionally a good thing.

== Behavioral causes ==
In Escaping the progress trap (2007), O'Leary examines historical and scientific evidence for patterns and underlying causes of progress traps, arguing that individual behaviour is a contributing factor. His study relates how individuals, institutions and societies can become focused on technocratic instruments in the service of short-term interests. Where advances result from technical specialization and are harmful—such as desertification resulting from irrigation—the trend compounds itself and can be irreversible. Examples are Sumer and the Indus Valley civilization where irrigation canals slowly combined to increase soil salinity, preventing the land from supporting harvests on which populations relied. The decline of Seymour Cray's Control Data Corporation is a modern case. Fossil fuel consumption in an era of climate change is an illustration of the problem; renewable energy is viewed as a solution.

O’Leary argues that such traps are not solely technological or environmental but stem historically from how humans think and solve problems. He draws on research in neuroscience, notably the work of Nobel Laureate Roger W. Sperry and others in the field of lateralization of brain function to suggest that an overemphasis on analytical, technical reasoning — associated with the left hemisphere of the brain — can diminish individual and societal awareness of broader ecological realities and holistic solutions. This mindset reinforces technocratic approaches that create more complications. In contrast, balanced approaches (including creative and intuitive thinking) might help avoid or escape progress traps.

The view is supported by Iain McGilchrist's 2009 book The Master and His Emissary, which provides neurological insight into lateralization of brain function, where predominant attention to short-term interests might compromise long-term outcomes.

== Art ==
Aurora Picture Show, a microcinema in Houston, Texas, has released a collection of "informational videos by artists who use recent technological tools for purposes other than what they were designed to do and, in some instances, in direct opposition to their intended use". The title of the DVD is At Your Service: Escaping the Progress Trap.

== See also ==
- Counterproductivity
- Cultural lag
- Escalation of commitment, also known as irrational escalation
- Middle income trap
- Neophobia
- Resilience (ecology)
- Societal collapse
- System justification

== Sources ==
- A Short History of Progress - Joseph Heath, University of Toronto Quarterly (Review) 2006
- A Short History of Progress - Kirkus Review, 2010
