= Surviving Progress =

- Directed by: Mathieu Roy, Harold Crooks (co-director)
- Written by: Harold Crooks, Mathieu Roy
- Based on: A Short History of Progress by Ronald Wright
- Produced by: Daniel Louis. Denise Robert, Gerry Flahive
- Distributed by: First Run Features (US)
- Release dates: September 11, 2011 (2011 TIFF); April 6, 2012 (New York City)
- Running time: 86 minutes
- Country: Canada
- Language: English

Surviving Progress is a 2011 Canadian documentary film written and directed by Mathieu Roy and Harold Crooks, loosely based on A Short History of Progress, a book and a 2004 Massey Lecture series by Ronald Wright about societal collapse.

The film was produced by Daniel Louis, Denise Robert, and Gerry Flahive.

== Subject matter ==
The film is structured as a series of interviews, interspersed with footage from all over the world. The film is said to be "inspired by" Wright's lectures: Unlike the book, which focused on ancient civilizations, the film focuses on the present-day impact of civilization, including the impact of concentrated wealth. The underlying message here is that current models and strategies of economic growth have no practical connections with the real world. That is to say, the lack of an ethical underpinning in modern global economic practices is directly responsible for the overconsumption and exploitation of natural resources to the extent that the increasingly more probable future population collapse would take modern society right along with it.

== Interviewees ==
- Ronald Wright ... Author, A Short History of Progress
- Mark D. Levine ... Group Leader, China Energy Group
- Robert Wright ... Author, Nonzero: The Logic of Human Destiny
- Marina Silva ... Former Brazilian Minister of the Environment
- Kambale Musavuli ... Friends of the Congo
- Vaclav Smil ... Population Scientist/author, Global Catastrophies and Trends (ISBN 0262195860)
- Colin Beavan ... Engineer/author
- Michael Hudson ... Economic historian
- Jane Goodall ... Primatologist
- Ming Chen ... Self Driving Club Tour Guide
- Changnian Chen ... Professor/father of Ming Chen
- Craig Venter ... Biologist/CEO of Synthetic Genomics
- Raquel Taitson-Queiroz ... Environmental police officer, Brazilian Institute of Environment and Renewable Natural Resources
- Gary Marcus ... Cognitive psychologist/author, The Birth of the Mind (ISBN 0465044050)
- Daniel Povinelli ... Behavioral scientist
- Victor Gau ... Director, China National Association of International Studies
- Margaret Atwood ... Author, Payback: Debt and the Shadow Side of Wealth
- Jim Thomas ... Activist, ETC Group
- Simon Johnson ... Former Chief Economist, International Monetary Fund
- Enio Beata ... Sawmill owner
- David Suzuki... Geneticist/activist

== Production ==
The film rights were sold to Cinémaginaire in 2008. It was directed by Mathieu Roy and co-directed by Harold Crooks with Daniel Louis and Denise Robert as producers for Cinemaginaire and Gerry Flahive as producer for the National Film Board of Canada (NFB). Executive producers included director Martin Scorsese, Silva Basmajian from NFB, and Big Picture Media Corporation; the latter had produced the 2003 documentary The Corporation.

== Release ==
The film premiered at the 2011 Toronto International Film Festival. It was also shown as part of Festival Atmospheres on March 31, 2012, in Paris.

== Reception ==
Calling it a "bone-chilling new documentary", Roger Ebert gave the film 3½ stars out of 4, and called it "bright, entertaining". According to Maclean's:

Turning ideas into seductive, irresistible cinema isn't easy, especially if they're the kind of ideas that are good for you....But a fresh genre of populist persuasion has emerged in recent years that's met with remarkable success: the dynamic docu-essay. Some notable examples include The Corporation, an likely [sic] hit that diagnosed capitalism's basic organism as a psychopath; An Inconvenient Truth, Al Gore's power-point polemic, which put global warming on the map; and Inside Job, a forensic inquiry into the 2008 financial crisis. The popularity of these films (the last two won Oscars) underscores a genuine appetite for global analysis that the fragmented vision of the news media fails to provide....The latest example is Surviving Progress, a Canadian documentary about the increasing weight of the human footprint of the planet. It's a high-level lesson that is enlightening, engrossing and beautiful to look at.

Kenneth Turan calls it "brainy and light on its feet, bristling with provocative insights and probing questions"; according to Turan, "though it features lively editing and a wide variety of involving visuals, Surviving Progress depends for its impact on the intelligence and eloquence of the numerous people interviewed."

On Rotten Tomatoes, 73% of the 37 reviews were positive.

The film received a Green Cross Italia Special Mention at the CinemAmbiente Environmental Film Festival in Torino, Italy, in June 2012.

== See also ==
- Historic recurrence
