= Shopping (novel) =

1998 novel by Gavin Kramer

- First edition
- Author: Gavin Kramer
- Language: English
- Publisher: Fourth Estate (UK); Soho Press (US)
- Publication date: 1998 (UK); 2000 (US)
- Publication place: United Kingdom
- Media type: Print
- Pages: 215
- Awards: David Higham Prize; Geoffrey Faber Memorial Prize
- ISBN: 1-85702-807-4

Shopping, is the debut novel by British author Gavin Kramer, published in 1998 by Fourth Estate. It won the David Higham Prize, the Geoffrey Faber Memorial Prize, and was short-listed for the Whitbread First Novel Award.

== Plot introduction ==
Tall, awkward Meadowlark, an English lawyer, is determined to make a success of his two-year assignment in Tokyo. He appears dull, infallible, and incorruptible; immune to the temptations of the Roppongi nightlife. But then he meets Sachiko, a fashion-obsessed teenager who leads him on an expensive buying spree. Eventually, Sachiko meets a richer sponsor, and Meadowlark falls apart.

== Reception ==
Reviews were generally positive :

- Francine Prose in The New York Times wrote, "Kramer's vision and analysis of Japanese society are neither especially profound nor revelatory, but his book is a great deal of fun"..."Kramer has a sharp ear for the hilarious conversations that take place when the participants speak just enough of the same language to make themselves hopelessly misunderstood. His energy is infectious, and at times his writing is not merely breathless but exhilarating as he conveys the experience of ricocheting through the sensory overload of Tokyo." but then warns, "The highly charged prose style of Shopping can carry you, quite contentedly, through much of the book. It's not until the last third or so, when the plot spins out of control and begins to fall apart, the reader finally notices that the characters lack the individuality and depth required to make fiction seem driven by psychological necessity rather than by the arbitrary, dogged application of the author's will." She concludes "Gavin Kramer is talented. He can really write, and Shopping promises that—in the near future, one hopes—he will write a consistently satisfying novel.
- Kirkus Reviews has a similar conclusion, "Images of Tokyo today are engagingly rendered with precision and a knowing eye, but the characters in this flashy pool all stick to the shallow end.

== Publication history ==
- 1998, UK, Fourth Estate, ISBN 1-85702-807-4, Pub date Jun 1998, Paperback
- 1999, UK, Fourth Estate, ISBN 1-84115-129-7, Pub date Apr 1999, Hardback
- 1999, UK, Fourth Estate, ISBN 1-85702-958-5, Pub date Apr 1999, Paperback
- 2000, US, Soho Press, ISBN 1569471894, Pub date Apr 2000, Hardback
- 2003, US, Soho Press, ISBN 1569472297, Pub date Jul 2003, Paperback
