= High-income trap =

Economic phenomenon

The high-income trap refers to the phenomenon of slower growth in most high-income, developed countries compared to lower-income countries. Some economists argue that there is more evidence for a high-income trap than the middle-income trap. Among the countries said to experience this trap are Taiwan and Japan.
