= What Is America? =

2008 book by Ronald Wright

- Author: Ronald Wright
- Subject: United States history
- Publisher: Da Capo Press
- Publication date: 2008
- ISBN: 9781921351501
- Dewey Decimal: 973
- LC Class: E178
- Preceded by: A Short History of Progress

What Is America? A Short History of the New World Order (ISBN 9781921351501) is a 2008 non-fiction book by Ronald Wright that continues the thread begun in A Short History of Progress by examining what he calls "the Columbian Age" and consequently the nature and historical origins of modern American imperium.

== See also ==
- A Short History of Progress
- Stolen Continents
