= Fred D'Aguiar =

British poet, novelist, and playwright (born 1960)

Fred D'Aguiar FRSL
- Born: 2 February 1960 (age 66); London, England
- Education: University of Kent (1985)
- Occupations: Poet, novelist, playwright, Professor of English at Virginia Tech
- Writing career
- Genres: Fiction, poetry, stage plays
- Notable works: Poetry: Mama Dot (1985); Airy Hall (1989); Novels: The Longest Memory (1994)
- Notable awards: Guyana Poetry Prize (1989); David Higham Prize for Fiction (1994); Whitbread First Novel Award (1994)

Fred D'Aguiar (born 2 February 1960) is a British poet, novelist, and playwright. He is currently a Professor of English at the University of California, Los Angeles (UCLA).

== Life ==
Fred D'Aguiar was born in London, England, in 1960 to Guyanese parents, Malcolm Frederick D'Aguiar and Kathleen Agatha Messiah. In 1962 he was taken to Guyana, living there with his grandmother until 1972, when he returned to England at the age of 12.

D'Aguiar trained as a psychiatric nurse before reading African and Caribbean Studies at the University of Kent, Canterbury, graduating in 1985. On graduating he applied for a PhD on the Guyanese author Wilson Harris at the University of Warwick, but – after winning two writers-in-residency positions, at Birmingham University and the University of Cambridge (where he was the Judith E. Wilson Fellow from 1989 to 1990) – his PhD studies "receded from [his] mind" and he began to focus all of his energies on creative writing.

In 1994, D'Aguiar moved to the United States to take up a Visiting Writer position at Amherst College, Amherst, Massachusetts (1992–94). Since then, he has taught as an Assistant Professor at Bates College, Lewiston, Maine(1994–95) and the University of Miami where he held the position of Professor of English and Creative Writing. In 2003 he took up the position of Professor of English and Co-Director of the Master of Fine Arts in Creative Writing at Virginia Tech. In the fall of 2015, he became a Professor of English and Director of Creative Writing at UCLA, which post ended in 2019.

He was elected a Fellow of the Royal Society of Literature in 2022.

D'Aguiar fathers a son with fellow poet Jackie Kay.

== Poetry, novels and plays ==
=== Poetry ===
D'Aguiar's first collection of poetry, Mama Dot (Chatto, 1985), was published "to much acclaim". It centres on the eponymous "archetypal" grandmother figure, Mama Dot, and was noted for its fusion of standard English and Nation language. Along with his 1989 collection Airy Hall (named after the village in Guyana where D'Aguiar spent his childhood), Mama Dot won the Guyana Poetry Prize. Where D'Aguiar's first two poetry collections were set in Guyana, his third – British Subjects (1993) – explores the experiences of peoples of the West Indian diaspora in London. London was also the focus of another long poem, Sweet Thames, which was broadcast as part of the BBC "Worlds on Film" series on 3 July 1992 and won the Commission for Racial Equality Race in the Media Award.

After turning to writing novels for a period of time, D'Aguiar returned to the poetic mode in 1998, publishing Bill of Rights (1998): a long narrative poem centred on the Jonestown massacre in Guyana (1979) told in several Guyanese versions of English, fusing patois, Creole and Nation Language with standard vernacular. It was shortlisted for the 1998 T. S. Eliot Prize. Bill of Rights was followed by another narrative poem, Bloodlines (2000), which revolves around the story of a black slave and her white lover. His 2009 collection of poetry, Continental Shelf, centres on a response to the Virginia Tech Massacre in which 32 people were killed by a student in 2007. It was a finalist for the 2009 T. S. Eliot Prize.

=== Novels ===
D'Aguiar's first novel, The Longest Memory (1994), tells the story of Whitechapel, a slave on an 18th-century Virginia plantation. The book won both the David Higham Prize for Fiction and the Whitbread First Novel Award. It was adapted for television and televised by Channel 4 in the UK. Returning to themes he had earlier developed in British Subjects, D'Aguiar in his 1996 novel, Dear Future, explores the history of the West Indian diaspora through a fictional account of the lives of one extended family.

His third novel, Feeding the Ghosts (1997), was inspired by a visit D'Aguiar made to the Merseyside Maritime Museum in Liverpool and is based on the true story of the Zong massacre, in which 132 slaves were thrown from a slave ship into the Atlantic for insurance purposes. According to historical accounts, one slave survived and climbed back onto the ship; and in D'Aguiar's narrative this slave – about whom there is next to no historical information – is developed as the fictional character Mintah.

D'Aguiar's fourth novel, Bethany Bettany (2003), centres on a five-year-old Guyanese girl, Bethany, whose suffering has been read by some as symbolising that of a nation (Guyana) seeking to make itself whole again. His 2014 novel Children of Paradise is a fictional reimagining of the Jonestown massacre, told from the perspective of a mother and child living at the commune.

=== Plays ===
D'Aguiar's plays include High Life, first produced at the Albany Empire in London in 1987, and A Jamaican Airman Foresees His Death, performed at the Royal Court Theatre, London, in 1991. His radio play Mr Reasonable – about a freed black slave, a skilled silk weaver, who is engaged by Shakespeare to make theatrical costumes – was broadcast on BBC Radio 4 on 10 April 2015.

== Prizes and awards ==
- 1983: Minority Rights Group Award
- 1984: University of Kent T. S. Eliot Prize (for University of Kent students)
- 1985: GLC Literature Award
- 1985: Malcolm X Prize for Poetry (for Mama Dot)
- 1989: Guyana Poetry Prize (for Mama Dot and Airy Hall)
- 1993: Commission for Racial Equality Race in the Media Award (for Sweet Thames)
- 1994: David Higham Prize for Fiction (for The Longest Memory)
- 1994: Whitbread First Novel Award (for The Longest Memory)
- 1996: Guyana Prize for Literature (for Dear Future)
- 1997: Shortlisted for the James Tait Black Memorial Prize (for fiction) (for Feeding the Ghosts)
- 2009: T. S. Eliot Prize (Shortlist)
- 2019: Cholmondeley Award

== Works ==
- 1985. Mama Dot. London: Chatto & Windus.
- 1988. The New British Poetry 1968–88. Edited with Gillian Allnutt, Ken Edwards and Eric Mottram.
- 1989. Airy Hall. London: Chatto & Windus.
- 1993. British Subjects. London: Bloodaxe.
- 1994. The Longest Memory. London: Chatto & Windus.
- 1995. A Jamaican Airman Foresees His Death (play). London: Methuen.
- 1996. Dear Future. London: Chatto & Windus.
- 1997. Feeding the Ghosts. London: Chatto & Windus.
- 1998. Bill of Rights. London: Chatto & Windus.
- 2000. Bloodlines. London: Chatto & Windus.
- 2001. An English Sampler: New and Selected Poems.
- 2004. Bethany Bettany, 2003. London: Chatto & Windus.
- 2009. Continental Shelf. Oxford: Carcanet.
- 2014. Children of Paradise. New York: Harper (publisher)
- 2024. "In a Photograph with James Baldwin" in Encounters with James Baldwin: Celebrating 100 Years. London: Supernova Books.

== See also ==
- Caribbean literature
