= The Longest Memory =

1994 short novel by Fred D'Aguiar

- First edition
- Author: Fred D'Aguiar
- Language: English
- Publisher: Chatto & Windus
- Publication date: 1994
- Publication place: United Kingdom
- Media type: Print (Hardback)
- Pages: 144

The Longest Memory is a 1994 short novel (138 pages long) by British writer Fred D'Aguiar. It was the Guyana-born poet's first novel, The story takes place on a Virginian plantation, in the period before the American Civil War, between 1790 and 1810. The book is told through many different people and in different forms. It begins in the first person, with Whitechapel, the oldest and most respected slave on the plantation, recounting the sorrows of his life. From there on, each chapter is narrated by a different character, sometimes speaking through verse, via diary entry or in the second person. Most of the chapters are narrated by characters central to the story; however, chapter 11 is purely made up of fictitious editorials from the local newspaper known as The Virginian.

== Plot ==
A young slave, Chapel, falls in love with the daughter of the plantation owner. He attempts to run away and join his lover in the north. However his father, Whitechapel, betrays his whereabouts, fearing that his son will die if he is not captured and returned home to the plantation. Chapel is captured and brought back to the plantation where he is whipped by Sanders Junior, the overseer. Chapel catches a fever after the whipping and dies, due to his weak state. Everybody blames Whitechapel for Chapel's death.

Mr. Whitechapel, the owner of the plantation, was away from the plantation that day, and was unaware of the occurrences taking place. He had given specific instructions to hold the slave until he returned, which order was not carried out by Sanders Jr. Mr Whitechapel is angered when he finds out that Sanders Jr. whipped his half-brother to death. Then the book goes back in time to the diary of Sanders Senior, the memories of Cook and Lydia. It is then finished with extracts from the Virginian local newspaper of the year 1810 having direct connections with the events of the story.

== Reception ==
Praising the novel in her review in The Independent, Ruth Padel wrote: "Lyric optimism from rottenness and violence: a brilliant - and beautiful - achievement." The review in Kirkus Reviews concluded: "A small book with the emotional impact of a wide-screen blockbuster, the reasoned progress of a play, and the painful beauty of poetry."

== Awards ==
The Longest Memory was the winner of the 1994 Whitbread First Novel Award and the David Higham Prize for Fiction.
