= Adam Zameenzad =

Pakistani-born British writer

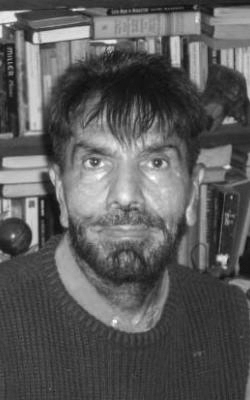

Adam Zameenzad (14 March 1937 - 4 December 2017), real name Saleem Ahmed, was a Pakistani-born British writer. The son of Fatima Aziz and Shammim Ahmad, he was born and educated in Pakistan and lived in Kenya, Canada and the USA before moving to Britain where he lived until his death in December 2017.

His novels are; The Thirteenth House (winner of the 1987 David Higham Prize for Fiction), My Friend Matt and Hena the Whore, Love, Bones and Water, Cyrus Cyrus, Gorgeous White Female and Pepsi & Maria.

Two of his novels (The Thirteenth House and Cyrus Cyrus) were longlisted for the Booker Prize.

Pepsi and Maria, a novel about the lives of street children, was published in 2004.

Zameenzad was the first Pakistani English novelist to explore transgender issues with his tight, multilayered novel Gorgeous White Female, published in 1995.
