= Stolen Continents =

1992 non-fiction book by Ronald Wright

- Author: Ronald Wright
- Subjects: Colonisation
- Genre: Non-fiction
- Publisher: Houghton Mifflin
- Publication date: 1992
- Pages: 320
- Award: Gordon Montador Award
- ISBN: 0-395-56500-6

Stolen Continents is a 1992 non-fiction book by Ronald Wright that covers the colonial theft of land between 1492 and 1990. It specifically focuses on activities directed towards the Maya, Inca, Aztec, Cherokee, and Haudenosaunee (Iroquois) peoples.

The book won the Gordon Montador Award in 1993.

== Synopsis ==
Stolen Continents covers the period 1492 to 1990 and documents five examples of the colonial theft of land from Maya, Inca, Aztec, Cherokee, and Haudenosaunee people. Wright breaks each example into three stages: initial contact, violent struggles, and modern resistance. The book uses contemporary accounts from native peoples.

== Critical reception ==
The writer T. F. Rigelhof described the book as "remarkable" and "essential reading." The archaeologist Brian M. Fagan was critical of what he saw as Wright's prioritisation of indigenous perspectives, which he claimed made the book unbalanced.

Stolen Continents won the Gordon Montador Award in 1993.

== See also ==
- A Short History of Progress (book by the same author)
- What Is America? (book by the same author)
