= R. M. Lamming =

British writer

R. M. Lamming, also known as Roberta Lamming or Bobbie Lamming (born 1948 or 1949) is a British writer. She has also written science fiction short stories under the pseudonym of Robin Douglas.

== Life ==
Lamming was born on the Isle of Man, the daughter of two doctors, Olive Lamming and Bob Lamming. She was educated at Rydal Penrhos and St Anne's College, Oxford. Her debut novel The Notebook of Gismondo Cavalletti won the David Higham First Novel Award in 1983. Her other titles include As In Eden and In the Dark.

== Works ==
- The Notebook of Gismondo Cavalletti, 1983
- In the dark, 1985
- As in Eden, 2005
