= False consciousness =

Marxist term examining the exploitation of workers

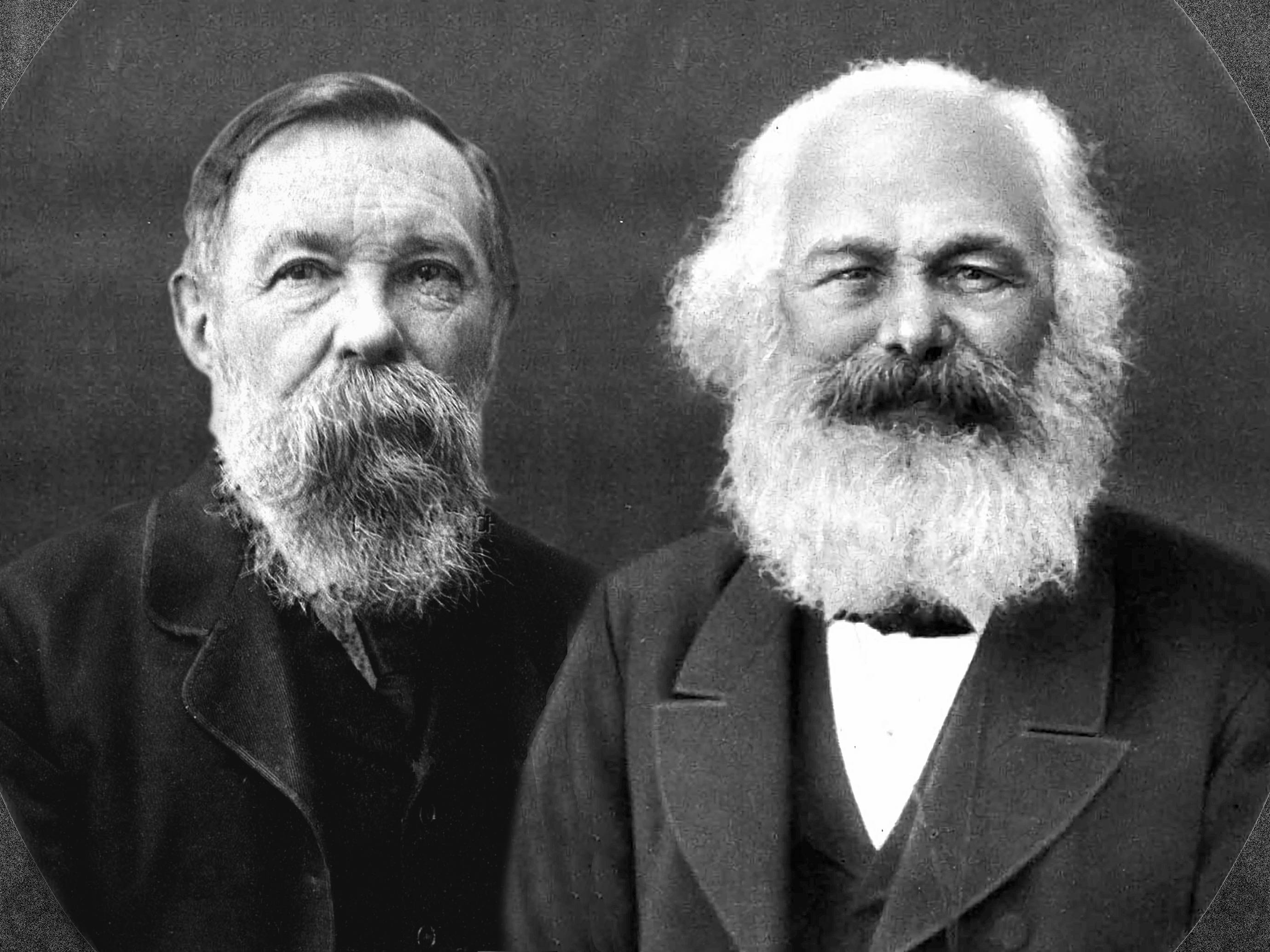
Portraits of Marx and Engels

In Marxist theory, false consciousness (German: falsches Bewußtsein) is a term describing the ways in which material, ideological, and institutional processes are said to mislead members of the proletariat and other class actors within capitalist societies, concealing the exploitation and inequality intrinsic to the social relations between classes. As such, it legitimizes and normalizes the existence of different social classes.

The term was never used by Karl Marx. It was used once by his associate Friedrich Engels to describe an incomplete insight into ideology, and then theorized by later Marxists starting in the 1920s. According to orthodox Marxists, false consciousness is consciousness which is misaligned from reality. Thus, it is a serious impediment to human progress and correcting it is a major focus of dialectical materialism.

== Origin of terminology ==
Although Marx never used the term "false consciousness" in his writings, he made references to workers having misguided or harmful ideas, and he suggested how those ideas get reinforced by powerful elites. For example, in an 1870 letter to Sigfrid Meyer and August Vogt, Marx discussed the antagonism between English proletarians and Irish proletarians that was rampant in his day:

The ordinary English worker hates the Irish worker as a competitor who lowers his standard of life. In relation to the Irish worker he regards himself as a member of the ruling nation and consequently he becomes a tool of the English aristocrats and capitalists against Ireland, thus strengthening their domination over himself. He cherishes religious, social, and national prejudices against the Irish worker... This antagonism is artificially kept alive and intensified by the press, the pulpit, the comic papers, in short, by all the means at the disposal of the ruling classes.

Marx considered this type of manipulated animosity among workers to be, in Ashley Crossman's words, "the opposite of class consciousness. Individualistic rather than collective in nature, it produces a view of oneself as a single entity engaged in competition with others of one's social and economic standing, rather than as part of a group with unified experiences, struggles, and interests".

The coinage of "false consciousness" is commonly traced to an 1893 letter from Friedrich Engels to Franz Mehring. It was ten years after Marx's death. Engels was seeking to explain how ideological notions come about, as he and Marx had understood it:

Ideology is a process accomplished by the so-called thinker consciously, it is true, but with a false consciousness. The real motive forces impelling him remain unknown to him; otherwise it simply would not be an ideological process.

Marxist philosopher Joseph McCarney notes in "Ideology and False Consciousness" that Engels was referring to "a quite specific kind of cognitive failure on the part of an individual, a failure of self-awareness, a lack of insight into the 'motive forces' of their own thinking". Engels was not using the term in the full sense it later acquired, i.e., as the mindset of a subordinate class which wittingly or unwittingly adopts the ideology of the ruling class. Engels only made this one reference to false consciousness. He died two years later and never had an opportunity to expound on its meaning and significance.

== Later development ==
It was not until the 1923 book History and Class Consciousness by Hungarian philosopher György Lukács that the concept of false consciousness was explored in depth. Ron Eyerman writes that Lukács defined false consciousness as "the distorted perception and beliefs an individual or a social class acquires through their life activities in capitalist society". Lukács did not regard false consciousness as a static condition but rather as a dialectical stage in the movement toward a true class consciousness.

In the 1930s, the Italian Marxist theorist Antonio Gramsci emphasized how false consciousness is a tool of ideological control. In his Prison Notebooks, he introduced the notion of cultural hegemony, the process under capitalism whereby the ruling classes create particular norms, values, and stigmas, amounting to a culture in which their continued dominance is considered both commonsensical and beneficial. In Eyerman's assessment, Gramsci "sought to explain the hold bourgeois ideologies had over the working class" and that "[any] movement for progressive social change under such conditions must work to re-educate and transform the false consciousness that makes hegemonic rule possible".

The false consciousness concept was further developed by Max Horkheimer, Herbert Marcuse and the early Frankfurt School of critical theory, as well as by French philosopher Henri Lefebvre. In the latter part of the 20th century, "false consciousness" began to be used in a non-Marxian context, specifically in relation to oppression based on sexual orientation, gender, race and ethnicity.

=== Structuralist interpretation ===
During the late 1960s and 1970s, structuralism gained popularity among academics and public intellectuals. In his 1970 essay "Ideology and Ideological State Apparatuses (Notes Towards an Investigation)", Louis Althusser offered a structuralist interpretation of ideology. He asserted that the "ideological apparatus" of the capitalist state—particularly that of the education system—inculcated a false consciousness which favored obedience and conformity.

=== Other explanations ===
In subsequent decades, numerous scholars and political analysts proposed explanations for why false consciousness arises and proliferates. In a 1984 paper, the economist Marshall I. Pomer argued that members of the proletariat disregard the true nature of class relations because of their faith in the possibility, and even likelihood, of upward mobility. Such faith is necessary according to economics theory with its presumption of rational agency; otherwise wage laborers would not support social relations antithetical to their self-interest.

Some political analysts have focused on where people's understanding of their interests originates. In an essay entitled "False Consciousness", Michael Parenti challenges the assumption that working-class Americans freely define their interests but then choose, for various reasons, to think and act against those interests. Instead he writes that "the development of one's own interests and political consciousness in general may be stunted or distorted by misinformation, disinformation, and a narrow but highly visible mainstream political agenda that rules out feasible alternatives". Parenti's contention is that ideological confusion is being propagated in the nation's politics and mass media and thereby causes people to misjudge what their real interests are.

Jon Wiener makes a similar point in a Dissent article, "Working-Class Republicans and 'False Consciousness'". He says that Thomas Frank's influential 2004 book What's the Matter with Kansas? was to a large extent an examination of how false consciousness had spread across the poorest counties of the Great Plains states: "He [Frank] shows how the Republicans and their media voices—Rush Limbaugh, Fox News, and so on—appeal to ordinary people with a class-conscious anger at 'the elite'. This elite is not the capitalist class; it is the liberals, who are held responsible for the 'decline' in 'values' that voters are called on to reverse".

== See also ==
- Capitalist realism
- Cognitive dissonance
- Consciousness raising
- Cultural hegemony
- Culture industry
- Dominant ideology
- Hermeneutics of suspicion
- "Ideology and Ideological State Apparatuses"
- Introspection illusion
- Marx's theory of alienation
- Political consciousness
- Propaganda model
- Seek truth from facts
- Spectacle
- System justification
- Turkeys voting for Christmas
- Vanguardism
