= Brian Maracle =

Brian Maracle (also known as Owennatekha; born 1947) is a Mohawk writer and broadcaster from Canada. He is most noted as a two-time nominee for the Writers' Trust of Canada's Gordon Montador Award, for his books Crazywater: Native Voices on Addiction and Recovery in 1994 and Back on the Rez in 1997.

A member of the Six Nations of the Grand River, Maracle was raised Ohsweken, Ontario and in New York before being educated at Dartmouth College. He then worked for indigenous organizations in Canada before returning to school, studying journalism at Carleton University, and then worked as a journalist on indigenous issues for The Globe and Mail and the Canadian Broadcasting Corporation, most notably hosting the radio series Our Native Land. He published Crazywater: Native Voices on Addiction and Recovery, an extensive study of addiction issues in First Nations communities, in 1993, and Back to the Rez, a memoir of his own experiences moving back to Ohsweken after having spent many years living and working in the wider world, in 1996.

After moving back to Ohsweken, he established a Mohawk language immersion school in the community, and hosted the radio program Tewatonhwehsen! on community radio station CKRZ-FM. He has also collaborated with his daughter, filmmaker Zoe Leigh Hopkins, on the 2012 sound art piece Karenniyohston – Old Songs Made Good.
