= Unspeakable (TV series) =

- Genre: Historical drama
- Created by: Robert C. Cooper
- Written by: Robert C. Cooper; Carl Binder; Adriana Capozzi; Lynn Coady
- Country of origin: Canada
- Original language: English
- No. of episodes: 8

Production
- Executive producers: Robert C. Cooper; Glenn Cockburn
- Production locations: Vancouver, British Columbia, Canada
- Production company: Mezo Entertainment

Original release
- Network: CBC Television, SundanceTV
- Release: January 9 – February 27, 2019

Unspeakable is an eight-episode Canadian television drama series created and written by Robert C. Cooper that aired on CBC Television and SundanceTV in the 2018–19 television season. Based on the books Bad Blood by Vic Parsons and The Gift of Death by Andre Picard, the series chronicles the emergence of HIV/AIDS and Hepatitis C in the Canadian Red Cross's blood banks in the early 1980s.

== Cast ==
Sanders family:

- Sarah Wayne Callies as Margaret Sanders
- Michael Shanks as Will Sanders
- Ricardo Ortiz as Ryan Sanders
  - Spencer Drever as Ryan Sanders (teen)

Landry family:

- Shawn Doyle as Ben Landry
- Camille Sullivan as Alice Landry
- Levi Meaden as Peter Thomas Landry
- Mackenzie Cardwell as Emma Landry
  - Trinity Likins as Emma Landry (child)

Krepke family:

- Aaron Douglas as Jim Krepke
- Karyn Mott as Lisa Krepke

Hartley family:

- David Lewis as Lawrence Hartley
- Katelyn Peterson as Jessica Hartley

Others

- Brian Markinson as Roger Perrault
- Randy Charach as Commons chair
- Paloma Kwiatkowski as Elizabeth Darby Stephens
- Diana Bang as Ruby Kim
- Ryan Grantham as Andy Girard
- Laura Bertram as Kelly Girard

== Episodes ==
| No. | Title | Directed by | Written by | Original release date |
|---|---|---|---|---|
| 1 | "Emergence (1982–1983)" | Robert C. Cooper | Robert C. Cooper | January 9, 2019 |
| 2 | "Contraction (1983–1984)" | Gregory Smith | Robert C. Cooper | January 16, 2019 |
| 3 | "Heat-Treatment (1984–1985)" | Gregory Smith | Adriana Capozzi | January 23, 2019 |
| 4 | "Unsafe (1985–1988)" | Gregory Smith | Carl Binder | January 30, 2019 |
| 5 | "Compensation (1988–1993)" | Sarah Wayne Callies | Lynn Coady | February 6, 2019 |
| 6 | "Krever (1993–1996)" | Andy Mikita | Robert C. Cooper | February 13, 2019 |
| 7 | "Intent (1997–2005)" | Andy Mikita | Carl Binder | February 20, 2019 |
| 8 | "Apologies (2005–2015)" | Robert C. Cooper | Robert C. Cooper | February 27, 2019 |
