= Gordon Montador Award =

Canadian literary award

- Description: Canadian literary award honouring non-fiction writing on social issues
- Country: Canada
- Presented by: Writers' Trust of Canada

The Gordon Montador Award was a Canadian literary award, presented by the Writers' Trust of Canada to honour non-fiction writing on social issues. Created in 1991 in memory of book editor and publisher Gordon Montador, the award was presented until 1999, when it was superseded by a reorganization of the Writers' Trust Awards. The Shaughnessy Cohen Prize for Political Writing, presented for the first time in 2000, encompassed much of the same subject area; although the Cohen award was never formally stated by the organization to be an official replacement for the Montador award, no new winner was ever announced for the Montador award after the Cohen award was introduced.

== Winners and nominees ==
| Year | Author | Title | Result | Ref. |
|---|---|---|---|---|
| 1993 | Ronald Wright | Stolen Continents | Winner | |
| 1993 | Doris Anderson | The Unfinished Revolution | Shortlist | |
| 1993 | Pat Capponi | Upstairs at the Crazy House | Shortlist | |
| 1993 | Mordecai Richler | Oh Canada! Oh Quebec! | Shortlist | |
| 1993 | Rupert Ross | Dancing with a Ghost | Shortlist | |
| 1993 | Marlene Webber | Food for Thought | Shortlist | |
| 1994 | Michael Ignatieff | Blood and Belonging, Journeys into the New Nationalism | Winner | |
| 1994 | Brian Maracle | Crazywater: Native Voices on Addiction and Recovery | Shortlist | |
| 1994 | Andrew Nikiforuk | School's Out: The Catastrophe in Public Education and What We Can Do About It | Shortlist | |
| 1994 | Boyce Richardson | People of Terra Nullius, Betrayal and Rebirth in Aboriginal Canada | Shortlist | |
| 1994 | Lindalee Tracey | On the Edge: A Journey into the Heart of Canada | Shortlist | |
| 1995 | Neil Bissoondath | Selling Illusions: The Cult of Multiculturalism in Canada | Winner | |
| 1995 | Maude Barlow, Heather-jane Robertson | Class Warfare: The Assault on Canada's Schools | Shortlist | |
| 1995 | James Cote, Anton L. Allahar | Generation on Hold: Coming of Age in the Late Twentieth Century | Shortlist | |
| 1995 | John MacLachlan Gray | Lost in North America: The Imaginary Canadian in the American Dream | Shortlist | |
| 1995 | Judy Steed | Our Little Secret: Confronting Child Sexual Abuse in Canada | Shortlist | |
| 1996 | John Ralston Saul | The Unconscious Civilization | Winner | |
| 1996 | Richard Gwyn | Nationalism Without Walls | Shortlist | |
| 1996 | Linda McQuaig | Shooting the Hippo | Shortlist | |
| 1996 | Patricia Monture-Angus | Thunder in My Soul: A Mohawk Woman Speaks | Shortlist | |
| 1996 | Vic Parsons | Bad Blood: The Tragedy of the Canadian Tainted Blood Scandal | Shortlist | |
| 1997 | Cecil Foster | A Place Called Heaven: The Meaning of Being Black in Canada | Winner | |
| 1997 | Mark Kingwell | Dreams of Millennium | Shortlist | |
| 1997 | Brian Maracle | Back on the Rez | Shortlist | |
| 1997 | Rupert Ross | Returning to the Teachings | Shortlist | |
| 1997 | Jan Wong | Red China Blues | Shortlist | |
| 1998 | John Ralston Saul | Reflections of a Siamese Twin: Canada at the End of the Twentieth Century | Winner | |
| 1999 | Jean Vanier | Becoming Human | Winner | |
