= Trinity Likins =

Canadian actress

- Born: Trinity Rose Elizabeth Likins; May 12, 2006 (age 19); Squamish, British Columbia
- Occupation: Actress
- Years active: 2017–present

Trinity Rose Likins (born May 12, 2006) is a Canadian actress. She is known for her roles as Forsythia "Jellybean" Jones in The CW series Riverdale, as Emma Landry in the TV mini-series Unspeakable, and as Amelia in the Hallmark Movie Channel original TV movie Christmas in the Air/12 Days. Her mother, Carey, is indigenous and her father Scott, is British.

== Early life and career ==
Likins was born in Squamish, British Columbia, Canada. She attended Valleycliffe Elementary School, and is currently in secondary school. Likins has an younger brother. She has claimed that she wanted to become an actress throughout her childhood, and begged her mother to hire a talent agent for her for years, saying, "I used to perform plays around the house for my family, I also would do the school play every year". In 2017, after topping her age group in the Premiere talent program, Likins won representation by Nigel Mikoski.

In 2018, Likins was cast in Season 3 of The CW's Riverdale, a series based on the characters and plotlines of Archie Comics. Likins was cast in the role of Forsythia "Jellybean" Jones, the younger sister of main character Jughead Jones (Cole Sprouse). Her casting was announced at New York Comic Con alongside that of Gina Gershon as the siblings' mother and Season 3 supporting antagonist Gladys Jones. Likins has said she was first informed of her casting by her father while she was in lunch period at school. There are unconfirmed rumors Likins beat out Stranger Things star Millie Bobby Brown for the role.

== Filmography ==
Television and film roles
Year	Title	Role	Notes
2017	Christmas in the Air/12 Days	Amelia	Television film (Hallmark Movie Channel)
2018-2021	Riverdale	Forsythia "Jellybean" Jones	23 episodes
2019	Unspeakable	Emma Landry	4 episodes
