= Glyn Hughes (writer) =

English writer and artist (1935–2011)

Glyn Hughes (25 May 1935 – 24 May 2011) was an English poet, novelist and artist.

== Early life and education ==
Glyn Hughes was born on 25 May 1935 in Altrincham. His father was a bus conductor, who had been unemployed in the 1920's. His mother "cleaned other people's houses." He grew up in a council house estate, introduced to literature by his father, who was a voracious reader.

Hughes attended Altrincham Grammar School for Boys. He has stated that "literature at school was nothing... had nothing to do with my life... A mess of words. " At the age of 13, he discovered Richard Jefferies on his own on the shelves of the public library.

After grammar school he attended a local art college and later trained to be a teacher.

== Career ==
Hughes worked as a teacher for 10 years before becoming a full-time writer in 1968. In 1970, he bought a derelict cottage in Millbank, Sowerby Bridge for 50GBP. In 1975, he published Millstone Grit, a journey through the West Riding of Yorkshire and East Lancashire. In it, he devotes an entire chapter describing how he interviewed William Holt.

His 1982 novel Where I Used to Play on the Green won the Guardian Fiction Prize and David Higham Prize for Fiction.

== Personal life and death ==
Hughes was married three times and had one son. He died from cancer on 24 May 2011, at the age of 75.

== Legacy ==
Millstone Grit was included in "William Atkins's top 10 books of the moor" in 2014, and was republished by Little Toller Books in 2022 with an introduction by Ben Myers.

== Selected publications ==
- Towards the Sun: poems & photographs (1971, Harry Chambers, Phoenix Pamphlet Poets, Manchester)
- Millstone Grit (1975, Readers Union: ISBN 978-0575017436)
- Where I Used to Play on the Green (1982, Gollancz: ISBN 978-0575029972)
- Life Class (2009, Shoestring: ISBN 9781904886983)
- A Year in the Bull-box (2011, Arc: ISBN 9781906570798)
