= Utopian thinking =

Concept of an idealized society

Utopia denotes an imagined ideal society that, though nonexistent in reality, is envisioned as a perfect habitat for its members. The term gained widespread usage following the publication of Thomas More's 1516 book Utopia. Building upon the work of sociologist Ruth Levitas, social psychologists have tested the functions of utopian thinking among people. Utopia is fundamentally a cultural and psychological concept, existing solely as symbols within people's minds. Empirical evidence supports the connections between utopian thinking and the three primary functions proposed by Levitas: criticism, change, and compensation. Theoretical models have been developed linking utopian thinking to established social psychological concepts such as collective action and system justification.

== Functions ==
=== Theoretical background ===
The term "utopia" gained widespread usage following the publication of Thomas More's book "Utopia" in 1516. Nevertheless, the concept of an ideal society is evident in historical records predating the coining of the term. Utopian visions are prevalent across diverse nations and communities, with content variations influenced by cultural differences. These utopian depictions have played pivotal roles in activism, art, political discourse, and philosophical texts. Importantly, utopian imagery extends beyond specific domains, frequently surfacing in everyday conversations among ordinary individuals. Extensive research has delved into the diversity and characteristics of utopian images within sociology, anthropology, and cultural studies. Researchers have founded the Society for Utopian Studies in 1975, which publishes the multidisciplinary peer-reviewed academic journal on this topic, Utopian Studies.

Levitas postulated three primary functions of utopias, emphasizing that these idealized visions play various roles for individuals and society. The first function is criticism, wherein the visualization of a utopian society highlights the deficiencies of the current societal structure. The act of contrasting the ideal with the present state of society provides a clear perspective on areas in need of improvement. The second function is change, serving as a motivating force that propels individuals to actively pursue the societal goals depicted in the utopian vision. Armed with a tangible image of a superior society, individuals can channel their efforts more effectively toward the abstract goal of societal improvement.

The third function is compensation, which introduces a somewhat divergent aspect. Individuals may find satisfaction in their imaginative utopian dreams, potentially leading to a reluctance to pursue actual change in reality. The psychological satisfaction derived from the imagination can inadvertently serve as a deterrent to tangible action. In summary, while utopian thinking is theorized to play a pivotal role in inspiring social action, there is a potential risk of individuals engaging in hedonic escapism, withdrawing from the real world into the comfort of their imaginative ideals.

Utopian thinking encompasses the mental act of envisioning an ideal society. It is conceptualized as a form of collective self-regulation by Fernando and colleagues, extending the self-regulatory function of the ideal self to the collective action domain. Self-discrepancy theory has unveiled that the ideal self's image can serve as motivation for regulating cognition, emotion, and behavior, driven by the desire to minimize the discrepancy between the ideal and actual self. Just as the ideal self can motivate individuals to pursue goals aligned with that ideal self concept, the mental representation of an ideal society has the potential to collectively motivate people toward shared objectives embedded in utopian visions. In fact, prominent social psychologists specializing in social change have contended that alternative societal visions hold power to motivate the conversion of societal structures. The acknowledgment that the current societal configuration is not the sole possibility, coupled with the act of envisioning an alternative society with desired attributes, has been posited as a pivotal catalyst for social change, according to social identity theorists.

=== Empirical evidence ===
In order to empirically explore the association between utopian thinking and its psychological functions, Fernando and colleagues devised a Utopianism scale, conducted correlational studies, and executed experimental studies. Individuals' inherent tendencies toward engaging in utopian thinking were found to be connected to the criticism, change, and compensation functions. Those prompted to articulate "an ideal or best possible society which is hoped or wished for" exhibited heightened intentions to partake in citizenship behaviors compared to a control group, providing evidence for the correlation between utopian thinking and the change function. Those who depicted their utopian images also demonstrated reduced satisfaction with the current society, substantiating the postulated relationship between utopian thinking and the criticism function. However, the compensation function did not exhibit elevated levels in response to experimentally induced utopian thinking. The researchers posited that the connection between utopian thinking and the compensation function could be moderated by the perceived likelihood of success of collective action. This implies that individuals could lean more towards escapism when the prospect of societal change is perceived as low. Additionally, the researchers noted that the functions of utopian thinking, viewed as both an individual difference and a situational influence, might differ. Dispositional utopian thinking exhibited a stronger predictive link with change functions, while experimental utopian thinking did not predict compensation functions. In summary, a meta-analysis unveiled an overall positive impact of utopian thinking on criticism, change, and compensation, although the effect sizes varied across studies.

To comprehend the mechanisms underlying the impact of utopian thinking on its functions, one of the aforementioned experimental studies investigated the influence of the sequence in which individuals contemplated utopian societies and their current reality. Oettingen's research on fantasy realization, which posits that mentally contrasting desired states with reality is instrumental in motivating goal-directed behavior, established that merely envisioning a fantasy is insufficient to stimulate goal-oriented actions. Instead, it is imperative to contrast the fantasy with the realities of the current situation, thereby engaging individuals in contemplating potential methods to achieve the envisioned outcome. Building on Oettingen's framework, Fernando and colleagues hypothesized and tested the notion that initiating utopian visions followed by a contrast with reality would be more effective in eliciting the functions of utopia, as opposed to initiating thoughts with the current reality and then introducing utopian ideals. The research team found empirical support for the idea that contrasting the current society after contemplating utopia is more effective in eliciting criticism and change functions. In contrast, the reverse order of utopian thinking did not yield a significant effect compared to a control group that did not engage in utopian contemplation.

=== Collective action ===
Utopian thinking could be incorporated and add significant value to existing models that explain collective action. The impact of utopian thinking extends to both conventionally conceptualized collective actions and more generic civic behaviors. The former indicates participation in a social movement toward a shared goal with others, while the latter refers to heightened engagement in society in any domain, whether or not in the company of like-minded individuals. Utopias could be constructed around a certain group identity, such as a feminist utopia, or could generally inspire imagination of an alternative better version of society, without pertaining to a group membership. The former will instill motivation for collective actions intended to achieve certain collective goals, for instance, achieving a feminist society. The latter will contribute to enhanced interest to be engaged with societal processes.

The Social Identity Model of Collective Action (SIMCA), a prominent collective action theory, posits group identity, injustice/anger, and moral conviction as primary motivators for participation. While group identification has been recognized as a pivotal motivator for collective action, utopian thinking introduces a pathway that can stimulate participation without necessitating a specific group affiliation. Conceiving a cognitive alternative through thinking about utopias without belonging to a specific ingroup is found to enhance collective action intentions. Furthermore, utopian thinking has the potential to instigate the formation of entirely new groups, thereby strengthening motivations for collective action through the tie of group identification and collective action as well. Researchers have conceptualized what they term "opinion-based groups," where similar opinions are the basis of group identification. Shared utopian visions could serve as the basis for new group formations. Smith and colleagues have theorized that the perceiving disparity between the current state of affairs and the envisioned ideal could give rise to a novel identity, which is highly relevant to the process of utopian thinking as well.

=== Overcome system justification ===
In the inaugural empirical exploration of utopian thinking, it has consistently emerged that such thinking diminishes system justification. Notably, Jost and colleagues underscored utopian thinking as a promising approach in their recent review of system justification. Building upon this foundation, Badaan and colleagues have proposed a comprehensive framework that interlinks the study of utopian thinking, collective action, and system justification. Within this model, two proposed mechanisms mediate the relationship between utopian thinking and the motivation for system justification: hope and abstraction. The first pathway is the affective route, wherein utopian thinking reduces system justification by fostering an increase in social hope. The second pathway is the cognitive-motivational route, wherein utopian thinking diminishes system justification by priming higher-level construal or abstraction.

The authors highlight that hope, as an emotion, is nuanced and not merely a naive or optimistic outlook. Hope transcends a positive expectation toward a goal; it inherently involves contemplating and implementing tangible methods to achieve that goal. Understanding hope is pivotal in mobilizing social action towards change, as the absence of hope leaves no motivation for initiating and sustaining the often arduous efforts required to achieve the goal of social change. Specifically, social hope pertains to the emotion an individual harbors for the future of society at large, extending beyond personal concerns. The act of envisioning an ideal society through utopian thinking is proposed to have the capacity to evoke hope and instill the belief that the utopian dream is indeed attainable.

Mental abstraction emerges as a crucial pathway, enabling individuals to explore cognitive alternatives that may not be readily accessible in their daily concrete thought processes. Abstraction proves effective in bringing distant goals, such as social change, closer to our cognitive forefront. The greater the level of abstraction in imagining utopia, the more significant the impact in rendering cognitive alternatives accessible in our minds. High-level construals, associated with abstract thinking, are also known to motivate self-control behaviors. Applied in the context of social change, the abstract contemplation of an ideal society is likely to trigger self-control behaviors, prompting individuals to adopt strategies for fostering societal change.

To scrutinize these pathways, researchers manipulated utopian thinking by having participants read an article describing either a utopian society or the current society. A structural equation model shed light on the relationships between variables. Utopian thinking increased both personal and social hope, subsequently elevating both system justification and collective action. The authors propose that this elevation might stem from the overlap in measures between hope and system justification, as certain items in the hope scale suggest that society is progressing in the right direction without major problems. Additionally, utopian thinking increased abstract thinking but exhibited only a marginal association with intentions for collective action. The authors elucidate that the measure for abstraction predominantly tapped into dispositional rather than situational aspects, making it less susceptible to change through utopian priming.

=== Utopia and dystopia ===
The antithesis to the concept of utopia is dystopia, representing a society that elicits fear and embodies the worst imaginable conditions. Both utopian and dystopian visions share the commonality of existing solely within the realm of human imagination, diverging significantly from the realities of contemporary society. Utopian ideals serve as a motivational force for societal participation, guiding collective efforts toward the realization of an envisioned ideal society.

Dystopian thinking can similarly prompt societal engagement but in a manner distinct from utopian ideals. Dystopian societies, feared and avoided by individuals, stimulate preventive behaviors aimed at averting the realization of such nightmarish scenarios. The functionality of dystopian thinking can also be elucidated through the framework of collective self-regulation. The concept of "ought selves" propels individuals towards self-improvement driven by fear. Analogously, dystopian visions motivate societal involvement with the goal of steering the societal structure away from the envisaged dystopian nightmare. This engagement also aligns with the change and criticism functions proposed by Levitas within the framework of utopian thinking.

== Contents ==
=== Moderating role of content ===
Evidently, participants exhibit a diverse array of responses when prompted with utopian thinking scenarios. Several studies have delved into the significance of these varied responses, aiming to discern whether specific utopian contents prove more effective in eliciting the functions of utopia compared to others. Fernando and colleagues contrasted two prototypical utopias: the Green utopia and the Sci-Fi utopia. The former envisions a communal society dedicated to environmental protection and equitable resource sharing, while the latter portrays a society endowed with boundless resources, thanks to technological advancements.

Upon priming with the Green utopia, individuals demonstrated a greater likelihood of expressing intentions for general societal participation. Conversely, the priming of Sci-Fi utopias did not yield a similar increase in societal engagement. The authors posit that societies perceived as fostering greater interpersonal warmth are more effective in motivating intentions for change. This study focused on the impact of specific utopian priming on generic change intentions, and it does not provide insights into the effect on behaviors within specific domains.

=== Political orientation ===
Despite employing the same prompt in empirical studies to induce utopian thinking across participants, the responses' content exhibits variations influenced by an array of sociocultural factors. Among these factors, political orientation stands out as a prominent determinant in shaping the contents of utopian imagination. An examination of social media discourses, employing machine-learning methods, revealed that liberal and conservative users articulated different themes when envisioning ideal societies. Nevertheless, there were overarching themes common to utopian visions across both political orientations. Both liberal and conservative perspectives consistently emphasized the value of family, community, economic prosperity, and the pursuit of health, happiness, and freedom. However, notable differences surfaced in the specific themes highlighted by each group. Liberals tended to prioritize themes such as social justice, global inequality, women's rights, racism, criminal justice, healthcare, poverty, progress, social change, personal growth, and environmental sustainability. In contrast, conservatives more frequently centered their discussions around themes related to religion, social order, business, capitalism, national symbols, immigration, and terrorism. In conclusion, both diverging and converging themes are found across political orientations.

== Application ==
=== Cross-cultural development research method ===
Development agencies, exemplified by the United Nations Development Programme (UNDP), establish overarching development agendas that nations can collaboratively pursue. To ensure the efficacy and cultural relevance of these agendas, it is crucial to formulate them in a manner that resonates with the unique local contexts of individual countries. Although the UNDP has made strides in enhancing cultural sensitivity over time, there has been criticism of some development goals for their lack of cultural nuance.

Badaan and Choucair (2023) propose the adoption of utopian thinking as a methodology for constructing contextualized development agendas. This approach involves soliciting input from people worldwide regarding the type of world they envision, analyzing these responses, and incorporating the findings into development agendas. By doing so, development agencies can comprehensively capture the diverse aspirations for change across nations, cultures, and communities. Qualitative methods such as interviews, focus group discussions, and open-ended surveys are particularly well-suited to leverage the utopian thinking framework.

An inherent advantage of the utopian thinking approach is its potential to actively engage individuals in the process of social change. Through the act of envisioning and articulating the societal conditions they desire, people are more likely to contemplate and visualize the kind of environment in which they wish to reside. This process has been found to stimulate increased intentions for societal participation. Furthermore, priming ‘Green utopia’ when asking about an utopian society has been demonstrated to catalyze broader social change intentions and behaviors. This suggests that utopian thinking can effectively draw attention to and raise awareness about critical social issues.

Another notable advantage is the potential for development agencies to gather accurate information about the cultural nuances of various countries and regions. By directly consulting with individuals who will both shape and be impacted by these changes, agencies can construct goals that are attuned to the specific needs of different contexts. This approach facilitates the identification of both universal and culturally specific issues, enabling the development of more nuanced interventions that account for regional differences.

However, the implementation of the utopian thinking method raises realistic concerns. Firstly, the content of utopian imaginations may vary drastically, with some proposals aiming to enhance societal well-being, while others may advocate exclusionary visions detrimental to certain groups of society. Striking a balance between upholding human rights principles and navigating contradictory views within cultures is imperative. Besides, qualitative data collection from a diverse population demands more time and resources compared to alternative methods, necessitating a consideration of the tradeoff between efficiency and cultural sensitivity.

=== See also ===
- List of American utopian communities
- List of Finnish utopian communities
