= A Short History of Progress =

Book by Ronald Wright

- Author: Ronald Wright
- Language: English
- Series: Massey Lectures
- Subject: Societal collapse, Civilization, progress trap
- Genre: Non-fiction
- Publisher: House of Anansi Press
- Publication date: October 2004
- Publication place: Canada
- Media type: Print (paperback & hardcover), audio, digital
- Pages: 211
- ISBN: 0-88784-706-4
- OCLC: 56531474
- Preceded by: The Truth About Stories
- Followed by: Race Against Time

A Short History of Progress is a non-fiction book and lecture series by Ronald Wright about societal collapse. The lectures were delivered as a series of five speeches, each taking place in different cities across Canada as part of the 2004 Massey Lectures which were broadcast on the CBC Radio program, Ideas. The book version was published by House of Anansi Press and released at the same time as the lectures. The book spent more than a year on Canadian best-seller lists, won the Canadian Book Association's Libris Award for Non-Fiction Book of the Year, and was nominated for the British Columbia's National Award for Canadian Non-Fiction. It has since been reprinted in a hardcover format with illustrations and also in Kindle and EPUB digital formats.

Wright, an author of fiction and non-fiction works, uses the fallen civilisations of Easter Island, Sumer, Rome, and Maya, as well as examples from the Stone Age, to see what conditions led to the downfall of those societies. He examines the meaning of progress and its implications for civilizations—past and present—arguing that the twentieth century was a time of runaway growth in human population, consumption, and technology that has now placed an unsustainable burden on all natural systems.

In his analysis of the four cases of fallen civilizations, he notes that two (Easter Island and Sumer) failed due to depletion of natural resources—"their ecologies were unable to regenerate". The other two failed in their heartlands, "where ecological demand was highest", but left remnant populations that survived. He asks the question: "Why, if civilizations so often destroy themselves, has the overall experiment of civilization done so well?" For the answer, he says, we must look to natural regeneration and human migration. While some ancient civilizations were depleting their ecologies and failing, others were rising. Large expanses of the planet were unsettled. The other factor, evident in both Egypt and China, was that due to abundant resources (e.g., topsoil), farming methods (ones that worked with, rather than against, natural cycles), and settlement patterns, these civilizations had greater longevity.

Changes brought on by the exponential growth of human population (at the time of the book's publication, over six billion and adding more than 200 million people every three years) and the worldwide scale of resource consumption, have altered the picture, however. Ecological markers indicate that human civilization has now surpassed (since the 1980s) nature's capacity for regeneration. We are now using more than 125 percent of nature's yearly output. "If civilization is to survive, it must live on the interest, not the capital of nature". He concludes that "now is our chance to get the future right"—the collapse of human civilization is imminent if we do not act now to prevent it.

== Background ==
Prior to being selected to deliver the Massey Lectures, Wright had written award-winning fiction and non-fiction books that deal with anthropology and civilizations. His 1992 non-fiction book Stolen Continents was awarded the 1993 Gordon Montador Award from the Writers' Trust of Canada and his 1998 novel A Scientific Romance, about a museum curator who travels into the future and investigates the fate of the human race, won the David Higham Prize for Fiction for first-time novelists. Wright traces the origins of the ideas behind A Short History of Progress to the material he studied while writing A Scientific Romance and his 2000 essay for The Globe and Mail titled "Civilization is a Pyramid Scheme" about the fall of the ninth-century Mayan civilisation.

== Synopsis ==
The first chapter, "Gauguin's Questions", poses the questions that provide a framework for the book. Referring to Paul Gauguin's painting of the same name the questions are: Where do we come from? What are we? Where are we going? Wright defines progress using Victorian terms "the assumption that a pattern of change exists in the history of [hu]mankind...that it consists of irreversible changes in one direction only, and that this direction is towards improvement". Despite the extended period of the Stone Age, Wright places the first sign of progress as being the ability to create fire. The competition between Cro-Magnon and Neanderthals is examined concerning the conditions that allowed one to out-compete the other.

Many of the great ruins that grace the deserts and jungles of the earth are monuments to progress traps, the headstones of civilizations which fell victim to their own success. In the fates of such societies – once mighty, complex, and brilliant – lie the most instructive lessons...they are fallen airliners whose black boxes can tell us what went wrong.

— A Short History of Progress, p 8

The second chapter, "The Great Experiment", continues the examination of Stone Age progress by looking at the advancements in hunting. Wright uses the term "progress trap" to refer to innovations that create new problems for which the society is unable or unwilling to solve, or inadvertently create conditions that are worse than what existed before the innovation. For example, innovations in hunting during the Stone Age, specifically during the Pleistocene-Holocene transition, allowed for more successful hunts and consequently more free time during which culture and art were created (e.g., cave paintings, bone carvings, etc.), but also led to extinctions, most notably of megafauna. As smaller and smaller game were hunted to replace larger extinct animals, the hunts became less successful and culture declined. Agriculture, and subsequently civilisations, independently arising in multiple regions at about the same time, about 10,000 years ago, indicates to Wright that "given certain broad conditions, human societies everywhere will move towards greater size, complexity and environmental demand". The chapter title refers to the human experience which Wright sees as a large experiment testing what conditions are required for human civilisation to succeed.

In the third chapter, "Fools' Paradise", the rise and fall of two civilisations are examined: Easter Island and Sumer. Both flourished, but collapsed as a result of resource depletion; both were able to visually see their land being eroded but were unwilling to reform. On Easter Island logging, to erect statues and build boats, destroyed their ecosystem and led to wars over the last planks of wood on the island. In Sumer, a large irrigation system, as well as over-grazing, land clearing, and lime-burning led to desertification and soil salination.

The lesson I read in the past is this: that the health of land and water – and of woods, which are the keepers of water – can be the only lasting basis for any civilization's survival and success.

— A Short History of Progress, p 105

In the fourth chapter, "Pyramid Schemes", the fates of the Roman and Mayan civilisations are compared; both peaked with centralised empires but ended with power being diffused to their periphery as the center collapsed and ultra-conservative leadership refused reformations. Anthropologist Joseph Tainter's explanation for the fall of the Roman Empire is invoked, that "complex systems inevitably succumb to diminishing returns" so that the costs of operating an empire are so high that alternatives are implemented. Two examples of civilisations that have been sustainable are described: China and Egypt. Both had an abundance of resources, particularly topsoil, and used farming methods that worked with, rather than against, natural cycles, and settlement patterns that did not exceed, or permanently damage, the carrying capacity of the local environment.

The final chapter, "The Rebellion of the Tools", seeks to answer the final Gauguin question, "where are we going?", by applying these past examples to modern society. Wright sees needed reforms being blocked by vested interests who reject multi-lateral organisations, and support laissez-faire economics and transfers of power to corporations as leading to the social and environmental degradations that led to the collapse of previous civilisations. Necessary reforms are, in Wright's view, being blocked by vested interests who are hostile to change, including U.S. market extremists. Wright concludes that "our present behaviour is typical of failed societies at the zenith of their greed and arrogance" and calls for a shift towards long-term thinking:

The great advantage we have, our best chance for avoiding the fate of past societies, is that we know about those past societies. We can see how and why they went wrong. Homo sapiens has the information to know itself for what it is: an Ice Age hunter only half-evolved towards intelligence; clever but seldom wise. We are now at the stage when the Easter Islanders could still have halted the senseless cutting and carving, could have gathered the last trees' seeds to plant out of reach of the rats. We have the tools and the means to share resources, clean up pollution, dispense basic health care and birth control, set economic limits in line with natural ones. If we don't do these things now, while we prosper, we will never be able to do them when times get hard. Our fate will twist out of our hands.

== Style ==
The contents of the book were originally written and delivered as a set of five speeches for the 2004 Massey Lectures with each speech presented in the book as one chapter. The writing reflects Wright's oratorical speech and use of high rhetoric. Patrick Parrinder notes that Wright sometimes uses "the rhetorical armoury of a rationalistic lay preacher." Wright takes a broad, philosophical approach, not focusing on individual people or specific politics or religions, but rather focusing on civilisations including "the elites and the masses". Wright's tone was described as "rarely depressing...[and that] he remains surprisingly upbeat and even entertaining." The use of the word progress is intended to be ironic: what is viewed as technological or social advancement has, in the historical narratives he provides, led to the fall of civilizations. Wright coins the term "progress trap" to describe the phenomenon of turning "cleverness into recklessness."

Comparisons have been made between this book and Jared Diamond's Collapse which both cover similar subject matter with "a cautious problem-solving approach" and come to similar conclusions. Writing in Alternatives Journal, philosophy professor Kent Peacock notes that "both are well-written" but that Diamond includes examples of societies that had achieved sustainability for centuries, whereas Wright has "a stronger grasp of the dark side of human nature", like impatience, aggressiveness, and obstinacy. Author and journalist Brian Brett described Collapse as "a slow, rich feast" while "the compact A Short History of Progress is an arrow loosed from a powerful bow, a lyric dart into the heart of human behaviour."

== Publication and reception ==
The book, published by House of Anansi Press, was released at the same time the Massey Lectures were being delivered. In early November 2004, one lecture was given by Wright in each of the following cities: Ottawa, Edmonton, Saskatoon, Halifax, and Toronto. Their recording was broadcast on CBC Radio's Ideas during the week of 22 November. The book was named the Canadian Booksellers Association's 2005 Non-Fiction Book of the Year at their annual Libris Awards and short-listed for the first annual British Columbia Award for Canadian Non-Fiction. A hardcover edition title An Illustrated Short History of Progress was released with a print run of 15,000 copies in 2006.

In The Globe and Mail, Canadian author Paul William Roberts praised the book, calling it "... the most important use of printed word and post-consumer recycled fibres I have seen since Jérôme Deshusses's Délivrez Prométhée, 25 years ago." Roberts explains, "[Wright] has such a firm grasp of his goal that scarcely a word is extraneous... You feel you've read volumes, though, not just because of the density of Wright's thoughts, but due to the crushing weight of the burden they carry. In prose that is balefully evocative and irreducibly precise..." On the other hand, in the National Post review, Peter Foster gave a negative review, chiding Wright for "not having the slightest clue about how economies work, or how, by their fundamental nature, markets are both moral and sustainable." Foster ended his review by insulting Wright's intellect, "What really needs some psychological excavation is Ronald Wright's mind, which carries a set of inflated, emotionally based moralistic assumptions derived from the structure of his primitive ignorance about markets and economics."

Other reviews were encouraging. In Maclean's magazine, Brian Bethune wrote it was "an elegant and learned discussion" on the topic. The review in The Times said it was "an eminently readable account... written with an incredible lightness of touch that belies the very serious issues." In the Montreal Gazette, Bryan Demchinsky called Wright eloquent and the book "a brief, trenchant essay." Diane Barlee in Skeptic magazine said Wright is a "remarkably gifted wordsmith whose talent makes turgid facts not only digestible, but also generates a hunger for more" and commented, "A Short History of Progress is an important, well-crafted book, however, I can't promise that it will change your life."

== Film ==
The film rights were sold to Cinémaginaire in 2008. It was filmed as a documentary, Surviving Progress directed by Mathieu Roy and co-directed by Harold Crooks with Daniel Louis and Denise Robert as producers for Cinémaginaire and Gerry Flahive as producer for NFB. Martin Scorsese was attached to the project as executive producer as were Mark Achbar and Betsy Carson (Big Picture Media Corporation) and Silva Basmajian (NFB). The film premiered at the 2011 Toronto International Film Festival. It was also shown as part of Festival Atmospheres on 31 March 2012 in Paris, France.

While the book focused on ancient civilizations, the majority of the film addresses the environmental impacts of our current "global civilization", including the impact of concentrating wealth in the hands of the "financial class". It is filmed as a mixture of interviews with individuals, from Wright himself to Jane Goodall and Margaret Atwood, interspersed with striking footage from all over the world. Mathieu Roy and Harold Crooks gave an interview in early 2012 on the challenges of adapting Ronald Wright's book into a succinct film.

== See also ==
- Deforestation
- Demonic Males: Apes and the Origins of Human Violence
- Ecosystem
- Erosion
- Millennium Ecosystem Assessment
- Our Final Hour
- Plows, Plagues and Petroleum: How Humans Took Control of Climate
