= Political consciousness =

Psychological political theory

Following the work of Georg Wilhelm Friedrich Hegel, Karl Marx outlined the workings of a political consciousness.

== The politics of consciousness ==
Consciousness typically refers to the idea of a being who is self-aware. It is a distinction often reserved for human beings. This remains the original and most common usage of the term. For Marx, consciousness describes a person's political sense of self. That is, consciousness describes a person's awareness of politics. For Marx, an authentic consciousness was linked to understanding one's true position in History. While Hegel placed God behind the workings of consciousness in people, Marx saw the political economy as the engine of mind.

In the 20th century, many social movements and intellectuals have developed this use of consciousness.

== False consciousness ==
In Marx's view, consciousness was always political, for it was always the outcome of politic-economic circumstances. What one thinks of life, power, and self, for Marx, is always a product of ideological forces.

For Marx, ideologies appear to explain and justify the current distribution of wealth and power in a society. In societies with unequal allocations of wealth and power, ideologies present these inequalities as acceptable, virtuous, inevitable, and so forth. Ideologies thus tend to lead people to accept the status quo. The subordinate people come to believe in their subordination: the peasants to accept the rule of the aristocracy, the factory workers to accept the rule of the owners, consumers the rule of corporations. This belief in one's own subordination, which comes about through ideology, is, for Marx, false consciousness.

That is, conditions of inequality create ideologies which confuse people about their true aspirations, loyalties, and purposes. Thus, for example, the working class has often been, for Marx, beguiled by nationalism, organised religion, and other distractions. These ideological devices help to keep people from realising that it is they who produce wealth, they who deserve the fruits of the land, all who can prosper: instead of literally thinking for themselves, they think the thoughts given to them by the ruling class.

== Consciousness and the political-economy ==
For Marx, consciousness is a reflection of the political economy. A person's thoughts tend to be shaped by his or her political and economic circumstances. He famously wrote, "It is not the consciousness of men that determines their being, but, on the contrary, their social being that determines their consciousness."

Perhaps Marx's greatest contribution to modern thought... is his comprehensive investigation into the role of Ideology, or how social being determines consciousness, which results in certain (for the most part unconscious) belief and value systems depending on the particular economic infrastructure pertaining at the time. From a Marxian point of view all cultural artifacts--religious systems, philosophical positions, ethical values--are, naturally enough, products of consciousness and as such are subject to these ideological pressures.

== See also ==
- Critical consciousness
- Class consciousness
- Consciousness raising
- Double consciousness
- History of Consciousness, an interdisciplinary program at the University of California, Santa Cruz.
- Identity politics
- Woke
