= David Higham Prize for Fiction =

Literary award, 1975–1999

The David Higham Prize for Fiction was inaugurated in 1975 to mark the 80th birthday of David Higham, literary agent, and was awarded annually to a citizen of the Commonwealth, Republic of Ireland, Pakistan, or South Africa for a first novel or book of short stories. It was cancelled in 1999 due to "the lack of publicity its winners received."

== Past winners ==
- 1975 - Jane Gardam - Black Faces, White Faces and Matthew Vaughan - Chalky
- 1976 - Caroline Blackwood - The Stepdaughter
- 1977 - Patricia Finney - A Shadow of Gulls
- 1978 - Leslie Norris - Sliding: Short Stories
- 1979 - John Harvey - The Plate Shop
- 1980 - Ted Harriot - Keep On Running
- 1981 - Christopher Hope - A Separate Development
- 1982 - Glyn Hughes - Where I Used to Play on the Green
- 1983 - R. M. Lamming - The Notebook of Gismondo Cavalletti
- 1984 - James Buchan - A Parish of Rich Women
- 1985 - Patricia Ferguson - Family Myths and Legends
- 1986 - Jim Crace - Continent
- 1987 - Adam Zameenzad - The Thirteenth House
- 1988 - Carol Birch - Life in the Palace
- 1989 - Tim O'Grady - Motherland
- 1990 - Russell Celyn Jones - Soldiers and Innocents
- 1991 - John Loveday - Halo
- 1992 - Elspeth Barker - O Caledonia
- 1993 - Nicola Barker - Love Your Enemies
- 1994 - Fred D'Aguiar - The Longest Memory
- 1995 - Vikram Chandra - Red Earth and Pouring Rain
- 1996 - Linda Grant - The Cast Iron Shore
- 1997 - Ronald Wright - A Scientific Romance
- 1998 - Gavin Kramer - Shopping
