= System justification theory =

Theory explaining defense of status quo systems

System justification theory is a theory within social psychology that system-justifying beliefs serve a psychologically palliative function. It proposes that people have several underlying needs, which vary from individual to individual, that can be satisfied by the defense and justification of the status quo, even when the system may be disadvantageous to certain people. People have epistemic, existential, and relational needs that are met by and manifest as ideological support for the prevailing structure of social, economic, and political norms. Need for order and stability, and thus resistance to change or alternatives, for example, can be a motivator for individuals to see the status quo as good, legitimate, and even desirable.

According to system justification theory, people desire not only to hold favorable attitudes about themselves (ego-justification) and the groups to which they belong (group-justification), but also to hold positive attitudes about the overarching social structure in which they are entwined and find themselves obligated to (system-justification). This system-justifying motive sometimes produces the phenomenon known as out-group favoritism, an acceptance of system-consistent oppressive beliefs and stereotypes among low-status groups and viewing higher-status groups in a relatively positive image. Thus, the notion that individuals are simultaneously supporters and victims of system-instilled norms is a central idea in system justification theory. Additionally, the passive ease of supporting the current structure, sustained by the palliative function of system-justifying beliefs that overstate the perceived costs (material, social, or psychological) of altering the status quo, leads to resistance in which the existing social, economic, and political arrangements tend to be preferred. Alternatives to the status quo tend to be disparaged, and inequality continues to perpetuate.

== Origins ==
Previous social psychological theories that aimed to explain intergroup behavior typically focused on the tendencies for people to have positive attitudes about themselves (ego-justification) and their self-relevant groups (group-justification). In other words, people are motivated to engage in behaviors that allow for them to maintain a high self-esteem and a positive image of their group. System Justification theory addressed the additional, prevalent phenomenon known as out-group favoritism, in which people defend the social systems (status quo) even when it does not benefit, and in the long-run may even cause more harm, to the individual or the group to which he or she belongs. Out-group favoritism can manifest as a dis-identification on the part of members of lower social status with their own categorical grouping (social, ethnic, economic, political) and instead further support for the existing structure. Prior social psychology theories lacked explanation for and attention given to popular instances of out-group favoritism; thus, system justification theory was developed to further explain and understand why some people tend to legitimize the prevailing social systems, despite their being against one's interests, in a way that previous social psychological theories did not.

== Theoretical influences ==
While social identity theory, cognitive dissonance theory, the just-world fallacy, social dominance theory, and false consciousness have heavily influenced system justification theory, it has also expanded on these perspectives, infusing them with the system-justification motive and behaviors.

=== Cognitive dissonance theory ===
One of the most popular and well-known social psychological theories, cognitive dissonance theory explains that people have a need to maintain cognitive consistency in order to retain a positive self-image. System justification theory builds off the cognitive dissonance framework, in that it posits people will justify a social system in order to retain a positive image of that social system, due to the fact that they inherently play a role (whether passive or active) in perpetuating it.

=== Social identity theory ===
Jost and colleagues interpret social identity theory as suggesting that when people are presented with intergroup conflict that threatens their social group identities people will justify behaviors like stereotyping and discrimination against outgroups in order to maintain their positive group image. People with out-group favoritism will hold more positive images of other, often higher-status, groups (outgroups) than the groups they belong to (ingroups). Thus, the argument is that system justification theory builds on the foundations of social identity theory in attempting to account for the out-group favoritism observed in many disadvantaged group members that social identity theory does not.

=== Social dominance theory ===
This theory has widely been compared to system justification theory since they are both system-justifying theories. Social dominance theory focuses on people's motive to maintain a positive group image by generally supporting hierarchical inequality at the group level. Individuals with a high social dominance orientation (SDO) will hold myths that tend to be hierarchy-enhancing, which justify an in-group's place and their relation to it. Thus, in both social dominance theory and system justification theory, there are common threads of group-based opposition to equality and justification for maintaining intergroup inequalities through systemic norms.

=== Belief in a just world ===
According to the just world fallacy, people are inclined to believe the world is generally fair, and that the outcomes of people's behavior are subsequently deserved. Ideologies that relate to belief in a just world have to do with maintaining a sense of personal control and a desire to understand the world as non-random. Such ideologies include the Protestant work ethic and belief in meritocracy. Essentially, belief in a just world feeds an epistemic need for predictability, order, and stability in one's environment. System justification theory, while keeping the perspective that people are inclined to believe the world is just, extracts the underlying epistemic needs of the just world ideology and uses them as support for why people are motivated to uphold the system. In other words, preference for stability, predictability, and the perception of personal control, over random chance, motivates one to see the status quo as fair and legitimate.

=== False consciousness ===
In order to account for the phenomenon of outgroup favoritism that is a main component of system justification, theorists have derived heavily from the Marxist-feminist theories on the prevailing ideologies as tools to preserve the system. In particular, the concept of false consciousness, in which the dominant group in society believes their dominance to be destined, can help to inform why certain members of disadvantage groups sometimes engage in outgroup favoritism. Further, system justification emphasizes that those that lack means of material production (lower status) are subject to the ideas, (cultural values, legislation, and social teachings) of the dominant, controlling group.

== Aspects of the theory ==
=== Rationalization of the status quo ===
One of the main aspects of system justification theory explains that people are motivated to justify the status quo and view it as stable and desirable. To this extent, theorists have provided specific hypothesis in which the rationalization of the status quo can manifest. One consequence of the system-justifying motivation, is the rationalization of desirability of likely versus less-likely events.

Since people will be inclined to make sure their preferences are congruent with the status quo, in situations of inevitability, people are more likely to endorse the status quo as a coping mechanism for dealing with unpleasant realities. In essence, people will judge events that are more likely as more desirable than events that are less likely. Anticipatory rationalization studies completed during the 2000 American presidential election demonstrate how future candidate endorsement and desirability is dependent on the likelihood of that candidate winning. When subjects of both the Republican and Democratic parties were told, for example, that it was probable that one candidate would win over the other, people of both parties tended to rationalize support for the more likely winner. System justification for seemingly inevitable and unavoidable outcomes serves as a stress or dissonance reducer and provides psychological and emotional consolation, as well as allowing the individual to feel a sense of control over external events.

Another way people rationalize the status quo is through the use of stereotypes. When people perceive threats to the predominant system, they are more inclined to cling to and back the existing structure, and one way of doing so is by means of endorsing stereotypes that rationalize inequality. If one considers oneself a member of a higher social status group (economic standing, race, gender) he or she will hold favorable stereotypes about their group and less positive ones toward lower-status outgroups. As perceived legitimacy of the system or threat to it increases, members of both disadvantaged and advantaged groups will be more motivated to utilize stereotypes as explanatory rationalizations (no matter how weak) for unequal status differences. Those that belong to disadvantaged groups will tend to associate positive characteristics (favorable stereotypes) to high-status members and lead low-status group members to minimize negative feelings about their low status. Thus, stereotype endorsement as system justification is consensual and holds a palliative function. This is true for both the ingroup and outgroup. Stereotypes also deflect blame of unfair status differences from the system and instead, attribute inequality to group traits or characteristics. Such rationalization for inequality via stereotyping is said to be what makes political conservatives happier than liberals. In a 2012 research study on the connection of system justification beliefs and ambivalent sexism, researchers found that benevolent sexism beliefs related to higher life satisfaction through system justification. That is, both men and women may be motivated to hold benevolent sexism beliefs because such beliefs may help to promote the notion that the status quo is fair, which in turn can maintain life satisfaction.

=== Outgroup favoritism ===
In contrast to ingroup favoritism, which holds that people have a motivation to regard the social groups that they belong in more positively than other groups, outgroup favoritism is when people tend to regard groups to which they do not belong more positively than the groups to which they are members. System justification theorists argue that this is an example or manifestation of how some people have unconsciously absorbed, processed, and attempted to cope with existing inequalities—more specifically, one's own disadvantaged position in the social hierarchy. Because people have a tendency to justify the status quo (which usually consists of inequality among groups) and believe that it is fair and legitimate, certain people from low-status groups will accept, internalize, and hence perpetuate that inequality.

Criticisms of outgroup favoritism have suggested observations of this in disadvantaged group members are simply manifestations of more general demand characteristics or social norms that encourage low-status groups to evaluate other groups more positively. In response to this, system justification theorists introduced both implicit and explicit measures of outgroup favoritism. It was found that low-status group members still exhibited outgroup favoritism (i.e. preference for other groups) on both implicit and explicit measures, and they displayed higher instances of outgroup favoritism on implicit measures than on explicit (self-reported) measures. In contrast, people from high-status groups were found to display ingroup favoritism more on implicit measures.

Thus, it is expected that when motivation to justify the system or status quo increases and it is perceived to be more legitimate, high-status group members will also display increased ingroup favoritism, while low status group members will display increased outgroup favoritism. Researchers have also linked political conservatism with system justification, in that conservatism is associated with upholding tradition and resistance to change, which is similar to justifying the status quo (or current state of social, political, and economic norms). Along this vein, system justification theorists hold that high-status group members will engage in increased ingroup favoritism the more politically conservative they are, while low-status group members will display increased outgroup favoritism the more politically conservative they are.

=== Depressed entitlement ===
Research on wage disparities between men and women have found that women often believe they are paid less than men because they do not deserve equal pay. This depressed entitlement was first thought as the manifestation of women internalizing the low status of their gender compared to men. Subsequent research has found depressed entitlement occur across contexts in which gender was not a variable. System justification theorists have suggested that depressed entitlement is another general example of how individuals of low-status groups absorb their inferiority in order to justify the status quo. As such, system justification holds that low-status group members regardless of context will be more likely to display instances of depressed entitlement than high-status group members. This will also be seen more among low-status group members for completed work as opposed to work not yet completed.

=== Ego, group, and system justification motives ===
As previously stated, people are motivated by the desire for ego-justification and group-justification to view themselves and their group positively (which can manifest through feelings of self-esteem and value). The system-justification motive is people's desire to view the system or status quo in a favorable light as legitimate and fair. Among high-status group members, all three of these motives are congruent with one another. The need to believe the system is just and fair is easy for high-status group members because they are the groups benefiting from the system and status quo. Therefore, as the advantaged groups, holding positive regard for the self and group corresponds readily with believing the status quo is legitimate.

In particular, as system justification motives increase for high-status group members, ingroup ambivalence will decrease, levels of self-esteem will increase, and depression and neuroticism levels will decrease. For low-status groups, the ego-justification and group-justification motives come into conflict with the system-justification motive. If low-status group members have a desire to believe the status quo and prevailing system is fair and legitimate, then this would conflict with the motivation of these individuals to maintain positive self and group images. Theorists posit that this conflict of justification motives creates conflicting or mixed attitudes in low-status groups as a result of being the disadvantaged group that does not necessarily benefit from the status quo.

As system justification motives increase for low-status group members, ingroup ambivalence will increase and occur at stronger levels compared to high-status groups, levels of self-esteem will decrease, and depression and neuroticism levels will increase. Moreover, researchers suggest that when ego and group justification motives are particularly decreased, system-justification motives will increase.

=== Enhanced system justification among the disadvantaged ===
Based on cognitive dissonance theory that holds people have a need to reduce dissonance and maintain cognitive consistency, system justification theory explains that people are motivated to rationalize and justify instances of inequality in order to preserve and defend the legitimacy of the system. Because people have this need to believe the current prevailing system is legitimate and the way it is for a reason, when presented with instances where this might threaten that, people sometimes respond with more justifications to maintain the legitimacy of the system or status quo.

=== Compensatory stereotypes ===
Research has found that compensatory stereotypes might lead to increased justification of the status quo. That is, stereotypes that have components that would offset the negative aspects of the stereotypes would allow people to more easily explain or justify the inequality of the prevailing system. One of the more common examples is the compensatory stereotype of "poor but happy" or "rich but miserable." Stereotypes like these that incorporate a positive aspect to counterbalance the negative aspect would lead people to increase their justification of the status quo. Other findings suggested that these compensatory stereotypes are preferred by those with more left-leaning political ideologies, while those with more right-leaning political ideologies preferred non-complementary stereotypes that simply rationalized inequality rather than compensated for it. But that overall, conservatives were more likely to have increased system justification tendencies than liberals.

== Consequences of system justification ==
Consequences of people's motivation to legitimize the status quo are wide-ranging. In needing to believe that the current or prevailing systems are fair and just, results in people justifying the existing inequalities within it. Research on system justification theory has been applied to many different social and political contexts that have found the theory has implications for general social change, social policies, and specific communities. Research has found that people with increased system justification motives are more resistant to change, and thus an implication of this would be greater difficulty to move towards policies, governments, authority figures, and hierarchies that reflect equality.

Research suggests that system justification motives reduce emotional distress in people that would otherwise result in demands for amendments to perceived injustices or inequalities. Specifically, moral outrage, guilt, and frustration are reduced when system justification motives increase. This has shown to result in less support for social policies that redistribute resources in the aim for equality.

In developing countries, in which group inequalities are most evident, researchers were interested in testing the claim of system justification theory that when inequalities are more visible, this will result in greater justification of the status quo. Researchers visited the most impoverished areas of Bolivia, and found that children (aged 10–15) who were members of low-status groups legitimized the Bolivian government as sufficiently meeting the needs of the people more so than children from high-status groups. Observing system-justification motives in low-status groups located in one of the most impoverished countries implies there will be less support for social change in a country that arguably needs it the most.

In the aftermath of Hurricane Katrina in 2005, there were different reactions to the devastation it brought to communities as well as the government's relief efforts. Researchers who have studied these reactions, found that the slow and inefficient response of relief efforts were perceived by some to expose "governmental shortcomings, call into question the legitimacy of agency leadership, and highlight racial inequality in America." These perceptions indirectly brought a threat to the legitimacy of the U.S. government (i.e. the system). As a result of this system threat, researchers found that people tended to restore legitimacy to the system through utilizing stereotypes and victim blaming. In particular, since the majority of the communities affected by Hurricane Katrina were generally low-income and composed mostly of minorities, some people used stereotypes to blame the victims for their misfortune and restore legitimacy to the government. Researchers explained how this could have consequences for the victims and the restoration of their homes and communities. Increased system justification, and increased victim blaming could be detrimental in providing the victims the resources needed to work towards repairing the damage caused by Hurricane Katrina.

== Critiques ==
=== Social identity theory debate ===
This debate arose from social identity theorists who countered a critique of social identity theory by system justification theorists. System justification theorists argued that the theoretical conception of system justification theory derived, in part, from limitations of social identity theory. In particular, system justification theorists have argued that social identity theory does not fully account for outgroup favoritism, and that it is more able to explain ingroup favoritism. Advocates for social identity theory have argued that this critique is more a result of lack of research on outgroup favoritism rather than a limitation of social identity theory's theoretical framework.

More recently, social identity theorists have put forward a social identity model of system attitudes (SIMSA), which offers several explanations for system justification that refer to social identity motives rather than a separate system justification motive. In 2019, a series of position and reply articles were published by proponents of both system justification theory and SIMSA in the debate section of the British Journal of Social Psychology. In 2023, this debate continued in the European Review of Social Psychology, with (a) a target article by Rubin et al. that expanded on SIMSA, (b) a rejoinder by Jost et al. that criticized this target article, and (c) a second article by Rubin et al. that responded to Jost et al.'s criticisms.

=== Relation to status quo bias ===
Another critique is that system justification theory is too similar and indistinguishable to status quo bias. Given that both deal directly with upholding and legitimizing the status quo, this critique is not unfounded. But system justification theory differs from the status quo bias in that it is predominately motivational rather than cognitive. Generally, the status quo bias refers to a tendency to prefer the default or established option when making choices. In contrast, system justification posits that people need and want to see prevailing social systems as fair and just. The motivational component of system justification means that its effects are exacerbated when people are under psychological threat or when they feel their outcomes are especially dependent on the system that is being justified.

== Current research ==
Congruent with a broader trend toward neuroscience, current research on system justification has tested to see how this manifests in the brain. Findings by researchers have shown that people with more conservative ideologies differed in certain brain structures, which was associated with sensitivity to threat and response conflict. Specifically, those who were more conservative were "associated with greater neural sensitivity to threat and larger amygdala volume, as well as less sensitivity to response conflict and smaller anterior cingulate volume," compared to those who were more liberal. This research is currently exploratory and has not yet determined the direction of the relations to ideology and brain structures.

Recent findings by researchers have shown that system justification motives to legitimize the status quo was found in young children. Through utilizing the developmental psychological theory and data, children as early as age 5 were found to have basic understandings of their ingroup and the status of their ingroup. System justification motives were also observed in that children from low-status groups were found to display implicit outgroup favoritism. Research on system justification in young children remains a current trend.

Utopian thinking has been proposed as an effective way to overcome system justification. Thinking about an ideal society can decrease system justification and increase collective action intentions by increasing hope and abstraction.

== See also ==
- Authority bias
- Cognitive bias
- Consensus theory
- Groupthink
- Ideology
- Noble lie
- List of cognitive biases
- Progress trap
