= Vic Parsons (writer) =

Canadian journalist and author

Vic Parsons (born 1942) is a retired Canadian journalist and author based in Victoria, British Columbia.

His latest book is Bad Blood: The Unspeakable Truth (2019), which is about the infection of the Canadian blood supply with HIV and Hepatitis C in the 1980s and 1990s. This is a revised and updated edition of his first book on the subject, Bad Blood: The Tragedy of the Canadian Tainted Blood Scandal (1995), which formed the basis for the 8-part CBC docudrama, Unspeakable (2019). Series writer and creator Robert C. Cooper called Parsons’ book a “detailed, compassionate and personal account of the tainted blood tragedy.” Bad Blood was shortlisted for the Gordon Montador Award for Canadian social policy in 1995 and for the Ottawa-Carleton Non-fiction award in 1996.

Parsons is also the author of Ken Thomson: Canada's Enigmatic Billionaire (1996) and a piece of historical fiction based on the life of Francis Dickens entitled Lesser Expectations: Charles Dickens' Son in North America (2014).

As a journalist, Parsons worked for about three decades with news wire services in Canada and also freelanced for The Globe and Mail, Maclean's, and the International Herald Tribune, among others. He served as National Business Editor for the Canadian Press in Toronto from 1981 to 1983 and Deputy Bureau Chief at CP Ottawa from 1983 to 1988.

He is the author of some prize-winning short stories, including Fabricio’s Bridge, awarded first prize for short story fiction by The Victoria Writers’ Society in 2014.

He wrote travel stories from Spain and South Africa for the Canadian Press and filed several stories from the world AIDS conference at Durban, South Africa in 2000.
