= Middle income trap =

When a country gets stuck at an income

In development economics, the middle income trap is a situation where a country has developed until GDP per capita has reached a middle level of income, but the country does not develop further and does not attain high income country status. The term was introduced by the World Bank in 2007 who defined it as the "middle-income range" countries with gross national product per capita that has remained between $1,000 to $12,000 at constant (2011) prices.

== Origin of the term ==
The term was coined by economists Indermit Gill and Homi Kharas in 2007 when they were working on the ground strategies for East Asian economics in the World Bank report "An East Asian Renaissance: Ideas for Economic Growth".

== Dynamics and avoidance ==
According to the concept, a country in the middle-income trap has lost its competitive edge in the export of manufactured goods due to rising wages, but is unable to keep up with more developed economies in the high-value-added market. As a result, newly industrialized economies such as South Africa and Brazil have not, for decades, left what the World Bank defines as the 'middle-income range' since their per capita gross national product has remained between $1,000 to $12,000 at constant (2011) prices. They suffer from low investment, slow growth in the secondary sector of the economy, limited industrial diversification and poor labor market conditions and, increasingly, aging populations.

Sociologist Salvatore Babones and political scientist Hartmut Elsenhans call the middle-income trap a "political trap" as economic methods to overcome it exist. However, few countries use them because of their political situation. They trace the causes of the trap to the structural problems and the inequalities generated in the early development process. According to them, the wealthy elites then follow their interests by bargaining for a strong currency which shifts the economy's structure towards the consumption of luxury goods and low-wage labor laws, which prevents the rise of mass consumption and mass income. They argue that countries can escape the middle-income trap by investing in physical and human infrastructure, enforcing social policies like higher minimum wages, and having a weak currency that makes exports competitive and stimulates domestic employment.

According to Asian Development Bank, avoiding the middle-income trap requires identifying strategies to introduce new processes and find new markets to maintain export growth. It is also essential to increase domestic demand because an expanding middle class can use its increasing purchasing power to buy high-quality, innovative products and help drive growth. The biggest challenge is moving from resource-driven growth based on cheap labor and cheap capital to high productivity and innovation, which requires investments in infrastructure and education—building a high-quality education system that encourages creativity and supports breakthroughs in science and technology that can be applied back into the economy. Diversifying exports is also considered important to escape the middle income trap.

According to The Economist basing on data from the World Bank, from 1960 to 2022, only 23 economies have been said to have escaped the middle income trap, most notably the Four Asian Tigers of Hong Kong, Singapore, South Korea, and Taiwan, Seychelles in Africa, Poland in Central Europe, as well as Saudi Arabia in the Middle East.

== Criticism ==
Significant debates exist regarding the empirical validity of the "middle-income trap."

Other economists either find that there is no middle income trap or claim that debates about a "middle-income trap" appear anachronistic: middle-income countries have exhibited higher growth rates than all others since the mid-1980s.

== See also ==
- Crony capitalism
- Dual-sector model
- Human capital
- Human Development Index
- List of countries by real GDP per capita growth
- Median income
- Progress trap
- Resource curse
- World-systems theory
