= Patricia Monture-Angus =

Patricia Monture-Angus (September 24, 1958 – November 17, 2010) was a Canadian Mohawk lawyer, activist, educator and author.

Monture-Angus was a member of the Six Nations of the Grand River. She graduated from Queen's University law school in May 1988, and went on to briefly study (but did not graduate) at Osgoode Hall. In August 1988, Monture-Angus filed a suit in Ontario's Supreme Court stating that she should not be required to take an oath of allegiance to the Queen because she is a member of a sovereign nation. According to Sections 4 and 5 of the Public Officers Act, R.S.O. 1980, c. 4 15 as amended, and Rules 53 (4) and 5 1 under the Law Society Act which stated that any person appointed to any office in Ontario or called as a barrister or admitted as a solicitor must declare the following oath:

I... do swear that I will be faithful and bear true allegiance to Her Majesty Queen Elizabeth the Second (or the reigning Sovereign for the time being), her heirs and successors according to law. So help me God.

Monture-Angus argued that she was a member of a sovereign people, the Mohawk Nation, whose sovereignty has never been surrendered or extinguished. This sovereignty has been consistently recognized through treaties and historical custom, both pre-dating Confederation and continuing uninterrupted thereafter. The case never went to court. The Law Society agreed to change its rules and make the oath optional. Monture-Angus was called to the Ontario bar in January 1994.

Monture-Angus taught law at Dalhousie University and at the University of Ottawa's Common Law School before accepting a position in the Department of Native Studies at the University of Saskatchewan in 1994. She was granted tenure in 1998 and promoted to full professor in 1999. She married Denis Angus of the Thunderchild First Nation Cree Nation, of Treaty Six, in 1991. Patricia Monture-Angus died on November 17, 2010, in Saskatoon, Saskatchewan.

== Publications ==
- Thunder in my Soul: A Mohawk Woman Speaks. Fernwood Publishing, Halifax, 1995.
- Journeying Forward: Dreaming First Nations' Independence. Fernwood Publishing, Halifax, 1999.
- First Voices: An Aboriginal Women's Reader Monture-Angus, Patricia and Patricia Mcguire (Eds). Inanna Publications, Toronto, 2009.
