= Gavin Kramer =

British writer

Gavin Kramer (born 1961) is a British writer. He was born in London and studied at Cambridge University. His debut novel Shopping won the David Higham Prize and the Geoffrey Faber Memorial Prize.
