= The Notebook of Gismondo Cavalletti =

The Notebook of Gismondo Cavalletti is a novel by R. M. Lamming published in 1983.

== Plot summary ==
The Notebook of Gismondo Cavalletti is a novel in which historical Florence is explored through the notes of Gismondo.

== Reception ==
Dave Langford reviewed The Notebook of Gismondo Cavalletti for White Dwarf #50, and stated that "Lamming writes beautifully, that she gives an object lesson in how to evoke period flavour without fake-archaic speech".

== Reviews ==
- Best Sellers
- British Book News
