= Harold Crooks =

Canadian writer and filmmaker

Harold Crooks is a Canadian-American filmmaker. He began his career as an investigative journalist covering environmental issues in Canada during the 1980s and 90s. His films cover the subjects of political economy and the impact humans have on their environment through technology and capitalism. Most recently he co-directed a documentary with the art writer Judd Tully about the artist David Hammons.

== Works ==
- Dirty Business: the Inside Story of the New Garbage Agglomerates, J. Lorimer, 1983
- Giants of garbage: the Rise of the Global Waste Industry and the Politics of Pollution Control, James Lorimer & Company, 1993

== Filmography ==
- The Champagne Safari, 1995
- The Corporation, 2003
- Surviving Progress, 2013
- The Price We Pay, 2014
- The Melt Goes On Forever: The Art and Times of David Hammons, 2022
