= Ronald Wright =

Canadian author (born 1948)

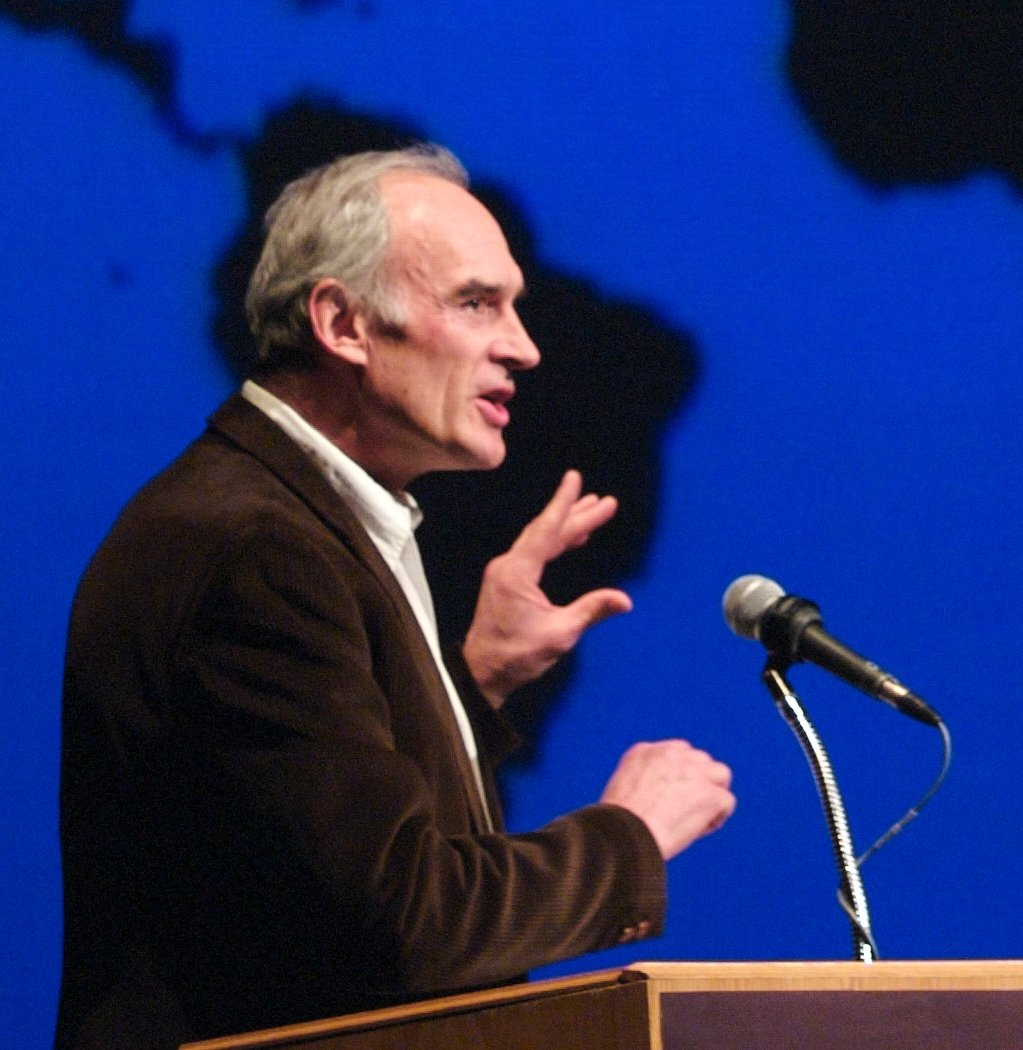
- Wright speaking at the University of Alberta, 2007
- Born: 1948 (age 77–78); London, United Kingdom
- Occupations: Writer, historian, novelist
- Notable work: Stolen Continents, A Short History of Progress, What Is America?

Ronald Wright (born 1948, London, England) is a Canadian author who has written books of travel, history and fiction. His nonfiction includes the bestseller Stolen Continents, winner of the Gordon Montador Award and chosen as a book of the year by The Independent and the Sunday Times. His first novel, A Scientific Romance, won the 1997 David Higham Prize for Fiction and was chosen a book of the year by the Globe and Mail, the Sunday Times, and The New York Times.

== Early life and education ==
He studied archaeology at Cambridge University and later at the University of Calgary, where he was awarded an honorary doctorate in 1996.

== Career ==
Wright has a background in archaeology, history, linguistics, anthropology and comparative culture. He has written both fiction and non-fiction books dealing with anthropology and civilizations.

Wright was selected to give the 2004 Massey Lectures. His contribution, A Short History of Progress, looks at the modern human predicament in light of the 10,000-year experiment with civilization. In it he concludes that human civilization, to survive, would need to become environmentally sustainable, with specific reference to global warming and climate change.

His second book What is America?: A Short History of the New World Order continues the thread begun in A Short History of Progress by examining what Wright calls "the Columbian Age" and consequently the nature and historical origins of modern American imperium. Wright traces the origins of the ideas behind A Short History of Progress to the material he studied while writing A Scientific Romance and his 2000 essay for The Globe and Mail titled "Civilization is a Pyramid Scheme" about the fall of the ninth-century Mayan civilization. His book The Gold Eaters was a novel set during the Spanish invasion of the Inca Empire in the 1520s–1540s, was published in 2015. His 1992 non-fiction book Stolen Continents was awarded the 1993 Gordon Montador Award from the Writers' Trust of Canada and his 1997 novel A Scientific Romance, about a museum curator who travels into the future and investigates the fate of the human race, won the David Higham Prize for Fiction for first-time novelists. The novel, Henderson's Spear, published in 2001, was about a jailed filmmaker piecing together her family history in Polynesia.

Wright is a contributor to the Times Literary Supplement, and has written and presented documentaries for radio and television on both sides of the Atlantic.

== Bibliography ==
=== Novels ===
- Wright, Ronald (1997), A Scientific Romance, London: Anchor, ISBN 9781862300118
- Wright, Ronald (2001), Henderson's Spear, London: Doubleday, ISBN 9780385602693
- Wright, Ronald (2015), The Gold Eaters, Toronto & New York: Penguin Random House, ISBN 9780670068265

=== Non-fiction ===
- Wright, Ronald (1984), Cut Stones and Crossroads: A Journey in Peru, New York: Viking, ISBN 9780670693818
- Wright, Ronald (1986), On Fiji Islands, New York: Viking, ISBN 9780670806348
- Wright, Ronald (1989), Time Among the Maya: Travels in Belize, Guatemala, and Mexico, London: Bodley Head, ISBN 9780370313023
- Wright, Ronald (1992), Stolen Continents: The "New World" Through Indian Eyes Since 1492, Toronto: Viking, ISBN 9780670834839
- Wright, Ronald (1992), Home and Away, Toronto: Knopf, ISBN 9780394280202
- Wright, Ronald (2004), A Short History of Progress, Toronto: Anansi, ISBN 9780887847066
- Wright, Ronald (2008), What is America?: A Short History of the New World Order, Toronto: Knopf, ISBN 9780676979824

== Awards ==
- 1986 Canadian Science Writers' Association Award, for "The Lamanai Enigma"
- 1990 Shortlist, Trillium Book Award, for Time Among the Maya
- 1991 Canadian Broadcasting Corporation Literary Award, for "Going to the Wall"
- 1992 Nominated, Author of the Year, CBA Libris Award, for Stolen Continents
- 1993 Gordon Montador Award, for Stolen Continents
- 1995 The Globe and Mail Editor's Choice, for A Scientific Romance
- 1996 Honorary Doctorate, University of Calgary
- 1997 David Higham Prize for Fiction for A Scientific Romance
- 1998 The Sunday Times (UK) Book of the Year, for A Scientific Romance
- 2005 Finalist, British Columbia Achievement Foundation Award for Canadian Non-Fiction, for A Short History of Progress
- 2005 CBA Libris Award, "Non-Fiction Book of the Year," for A Short History of Progress

== Personal life ==
In 2004, Wright moved from Ontario to one of the Gulf Islands in British Columbia.

== See also ==
- Societal collapse
