= 2020 Booker Prize =

British literary award given in 2020

- Date: 19 November 2020
- Location: Roundhouse, London
- Country: United Kingdom & Ireland

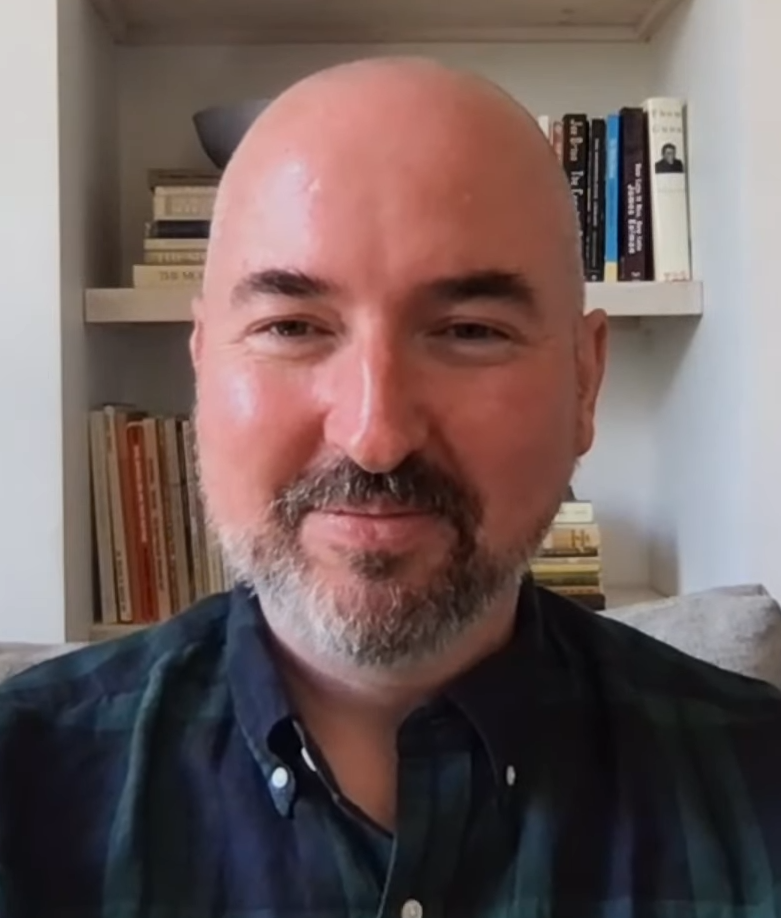
Douglas Stuart, winner of the 2020 Booker Prize

The 2020 Booker Prize for Fiction was announced on 19 November 2020. The Booker longlist of 13 books was announced on 27 July, and was narrowed down to a shortlist of six on 15 September. The Prize was awarded to Douglas Stuart for his debut novel, Shuggie Bain, receiving £50,000. Stuart is the second Scottish author to win the Booker Prize, after it was awarded to James Kelman for How Late It Was, How Late in 1994. The ceremony was hosted by John Wilson at the Roundhouse in Central London, and broadcast by the BBC. As a result of the COVID-19 pandemic, the shortlisted authors and guest speakers appeared virtually from their respective homes.

== Judging panel ==
- Margaret Busby
- Lee Child
- Lemn Sissay
- Sameer Rahim
- Emily Wilson

== Nominees ==
indicates the winner

=== Shortlist ===
Author	Title	Genre(s)	Country	Publisher
Douglas Stuart	Shuggie Bain	Novel	United Kingdom/United States	Picador / Pan Macmillan
Diane Cook	The New Wilderness	Novel	United States	Oneworld Publications
Tsitsi Dangarembga	This Mournable Body	Novel	Zimbabwe	Faber & Faber
Avni Doshi	Burnt Sugar	Novel	United States	Hamish Hamilton / Penguin Random House
Maaza Mengiste	The Shadow King	Novel	Ethiopia / United States	Canongate Books
Brandon Taylor	Real Life	Novel	United States	Originals / Daunt Books Publishing

=== Longlist ===
Author	Title	Genre(s)	Country	Publisher
Diane Cook	The New Wilderness	Novel	United States	Oneworld Publications
Tsitsi Dangarembga	This Mournable Body	Novel	Zimbabwe	Faber & Faber
Avni Doshi	Burnt Sugar	Novel	United States	Hamish Hamilton / Penguin Random House
Gabriel Krauze	Who They Was	Novel	United Kingdom	4th Estate / HarperCollins
Hilary Mantel	The Mirror & the Light	Novel	United Kingdom	4th Estate / HarperCollins
Colum McCann	Apeirogon	Novel	Ireland / United States	Bloomsbury Publishing
Maaza Mengiste	The Shadow King	Novel	Ethiopia / United States	Canongate Books
Kiley Reid	Such a Fun Age	Novel	United States	Bloomsbury Circus / Bloomsbury Publishing
Brandon Taylor	Real Life	Novel	United States	Originals / Daunt Books Publishing
Anne Tyler	Redhead by the Side of the Road	Novel	United States	Chatto & Windus / Vintage
Douglas Stuart	Shuggie Bain	Novel	United Kingdom/United States	Picador / Pan Macmillan
Sophie Ward	Love and Other Thought Experiments	Novel	United Kingdom	Corsair, Little, Brown
C Pam Zhang	How Much of These Hills Is Gold	Novel	United States	Virago, Little, Brown

== See also ==
- List of winners and shortlisted authors of the Booker Prize for Fiction
- The official home of the 2020 Booker Prize.
