= Mutoko =

Town of Mutoko Mutoko
- Town
- Interactive map of Town of Mutoko
- Coordinates: 17°24′0″S 32°13′0″E
- Sovereign state: Zimbabwe
- Province: Mashonaland East
- Administrative Station: 1911
- Sub-national government: 1988

Government
  - Type: Sub-national government
  - Governing body: Mutoko Rural District Council

Area
  - Total: 4,740 km^{2} (1,830 sq mi)

Population (2012 Census)
  - Total: 12,336
- Time zone: UTC+2 (CAT)
- No Postal Code: Mutoko
- Area code: 72
- Climate: Cwa

Mutoko is a small town in Mashonaland East province, Zimbabwe. It was established as an administrative station in 1911. It lies 143 km from Harare. It is named after the local chief, Mutoko.

The town is the capital of the Mutoko District, which is inhabited by the Buja people. The Buja people are said to have settled in Mutoko coming from the north through Mhingari in what is now Mozambique. They were led by Nehor-eka(or Nehoreka or Nohureka), his father Mukombwe, his brothers Nyanzunzu and Mukwiradombo and sister Chingate (Nyamungate). Nehor-eka found Makate and his people in this area and Nehor-eka gave his sister Chingate (or Nyamungate) to Makate as a wife. She later tricked Makate, leading to Nehor-eka's takeover of the kingdom. (see Nehanda and Chaminuka), a spiritual leader of the Buja people. Nehor-eka's totem is shumba(lion).

The name "Nehor-eka" does not have a local origin or meaning. Some would argue that it is derived from a fight with Makate that led him to be named Ndakukoreka. However, the structures of the names are too different to compare. There has previously been an attempt to link the name to a beast or animal such as mombe (cow) or buffalo, with no real meaning to the name. These animals do not relate to Nehor-eka totem. This attempt has resulted in it being distorted to Nohoreka or Nohureka by local people in the area in an effort to accommodate its unusual structure. It constitutes two words which are hyphenated. The first name, Nehor is of Hebrew or Aramaic origin which means "light". The variant of this name is Nahor. Neither 'Nohor' or 'Nohur', is found in local languages either, and the word 'eka' is also not found in Shona or any other local languages. Nehor-eka is a combination of two words. If 'Nehor' is of Aramaic origin, 'Eka' is of Indo-European origin and means 'one', or 'first' or 'hero', with other related meanings.

In an attempt to preserve the name, Nehoreka is also the name of a 10 piece Afro-Fusion music band, formed in Gweru, Zimbabwe by Percy Nhara, Solomon Jahwi and Innocent Madamombe. The band is now based in Harare. The town includes a future based young artist Blessing Sulumba (King Shy) who rose to fame in 2015 after his first album (Shasha dzega) which was also Sponsored by Childline Mutoko and launched at Starbrite Talent Show. The Mutoko District measures up to 678 km wide and has the famous teacher's college situated in the east.

The Buja people are known for being amongst the best tomato and mango farmers in Zimbabwe. Mutoko is surrounded by villages which were given to farmers after the war. It is from these resettlements the country is fed. In these areas, they produce maize, cotton, beans and recently tobacco. Mutoko is considered one of the major breadbaskets of Zimbabwe. Mutoko area is also known for being very mountainous, and as such is an important source of granite stone.

In 1937, one of the few leprosy treatment centres in the country was established at nearby Mutemwa, where John Bradburne worked from 1969 until he was killed by guerrillas during the Rhodesian Bush War. Up to 25,000 people attend a service there each year in his memory.

Mutoko is also the birthplace of Tsitsi Dangarembga, author of the famous post-colonial novel Nervous Conditions, Wilson Katiyo, Dzekasburg, Chawasarira, Admire Mudzonga and many others who stood as luminaries in this area of Zimbabwe. UK-based author, Masimba Musodza, although born and raised in Harare, is of the Buja people and takes pride in his heritage as a direct descendant of Nehor-eka.

Mutoko District consists of Mutoko Centre, resettlement areas such as Nyamuzizi and Hoyuyu, as well as reserve areas.

List of famous institutions in Mutoko:

- Nyadire Methodist Mission: Teachers College, mixed boarding facilities for High and primary school, hospital, Methodist church institution;
- Mutoko High School Government Funded boarding facilities mixed;
- All Souls Catholic Mission: Orphanage mixed Boarding facilities for High and primary schools, hospital, church;
- Nyamuzuwe Methodist Mission: mixed Boarding facilities for High and primary School hospital and church.
- Mother of Peace Orphanage: non profit social organization that provides a family setup for children. It also provides shelter, food, clothing and educational support.

Tourist attractions:

- Mutoko airport;
- Motoko centre;
- Mutoko ruins;
- Mudzi River.

27 km south-west of Mutoko lies a Developing Growth Point called Jani. It is considered the rapid rural developing centre in Mashonaland East. It has a capture area of about 30 km.

== Notable residents ==
- Itai Dzamara (born 1979), human rights activist.
