= The Shadow King =

The Shadow King may refer to:

- The Shadow King (film), a 2011 film project by Henry Selick cancelled in 2012
- The Shadow King (novel), a 2019 novel by Maaza Mengiste
- The Shadow King (play), a 2013 play by Tom E. Lewis and Michael Kantor based on King Lear
