= Goromonzi =

- Town
- Location within Zimbabwe
- Coordinates: 17°51′18″S 31°22′33″E
- Country: Zimbabwe
- Province: Mashonaland East
- District: Goromonzi District
- Elevation: 1,465 m (4,806 ft)

Population (2012 Census)
  - Total: 4,732
- Time zone: UTC+1 (CET)
  - Summer (DST): UTC+1 (CEST)

Goromonzi is a rural community in East Mashonaland, Zimbabwe, 20 miles (32 km) southeast of the country's capital city of Harare. The people are principally from the Shona tribe. The village serves as a trading centre for commercial, communal and co-operative farms. It is also the administrative centre for the Chinyika communal land and Goromonzi District. The community is located on a subsidiary road north of the A3 highway to Harare. Goromonzi Hill, at 1,581 metres (5,187 ft), is just southeast of the town.

The global rise in lithium prices in the early 2020s triggered a 'lithium rush' in which artisanal miners occupied a privately owned lithium claim area in Goromonzi. The artisanal miners were later evicted after the area was cordoned off and shut down by Zimbabwe’s Environmental Management Agency.
