= John of John =

2026 novel by Douglas Stuart

- First edition cover
- Author: Douglas Stuart
- Publisher: Grove Press
- Publication date: 5 May 2026
- Pages: 400
- ISBN: 978-0-802-16719-4
- Preceded by: Young Mungo

John of John is a 2026 novel by Scottish-American author Douglas Stuart. Well received by critics, it is a finalist for the 2026 Orwell Prize for Political Fiction and the 2026 Kirkus Prize for Fiction. It was shortlisted for the 2026 Booker Prize.

== Plot ==
The novel is set on the Isle of Harris in the Outer Hebrides of Scotland during the late 1990s. It follows John-Calum "Cal" MacLeod, a 22-year-old art school graduate who returns to his family's croft after four years away in Edinburgh. His father, John, a sheep farmer and weaver, has summoned him with news that his maternal grandmother, Ella, is seriously ill. In reality, Ella—a Glasgow native who refuses to speak Gaelic and clings to her profanity-laced English—remains relatively vigorous, and the call serves another purpose.

Cal's return is complicated by the strained relationship between father and son. John is a deacon in the local Presbyterian church, a strict Calvinist congregation that still disciplines its members in public shaming sessions and forbids its children activities such as using the swings on the Sabbath. Cal, by contrast, has dyed his long hair, wears torn jeans, and shows no inclination to join the elect in the pews nearest the altar. Their exchanges are often tense and occasionally violent, sparked by Cal's appearance and his refusal to embrace his father's austere faith.

Both father and son are concealing their sexuality from one another. Cal keeps quiet about the men he sleeps with in Edinburgh, while John struggles against his own desires, years after his wife Grace deserted him to live with his brother on another part of the island. The novel's title is explained when Cal, crossing The Minch, is asked by an elderly passenger "Who do you belong to?" He replies: "John of John of Ian of Ian the Breabadair" – breabadair meaning weaver, a reference to his family's crofting heritage.

The narrative weaves together the present-day tensions between Cal and John with flashbacks revealing long-held family secrets. Cal's grandmother Ella, whose family controls the tenancy, emerges as a key figure, and her influence over the household complicates the dynamics between father and son.

== Themes ==
John of John explores themes related to "identity, family, faith, and the idea of home". The novel specifically addresses masculinity among LGBT boys and men.

== Reception ==
John of John received starred reviews from Booklist, Kirkus Reviews, Library Journal, Publishers Weekly, and Shelf Awareness. In reviewing the novel, multiple critics described John of John as Stuart's best work yet.

Reviewers often discussed Stuart's skills as a writer, regarding both his prose and organization. Booklist's Juen Sawyer noted that Stuart's "prose is a joy to read and get lost in", while Hamilton Cain, writing for The Boston Globe, stated that his "prose is gorgeous and his plotting strategic; nothing is lost," adding that a "throwaway item in an early chapter loops back like a boomerang hundreds of pages later". Mark Harris, writing for The New York Times Book Review, discussed how the novel does not fall into the coming-of-age nor coming-home trope; rather, Stuart "uses that architecture to build something different, stranger and far more original". Harris added: "Stuart is not just a very good writer but an immensely skilled storyteller who is more than up to the extraordinarily challenging task he sets himself."

Reviewers were generally impressed with Stuart's character development, though some had qualms. Publishers Weekly highlighted how Stuart provides "deeply humane character work" to both primary and secondary characters throughout the novel. Library Journal's Jon Jeffryes similarly noted Stuart's "precise and complicated characterizations", adding that "even when characters act their worst, their vulnerabilities and humanity shine through, making the tragedy of their decisions more poignant". While The Wall Street Journal's Sam Sacks appreciated how Stuart "wields his powers of compassion to enlarge the characters of John and Cal", Sacks found that "these are grown men who merely behave like children", which makes it "harder to submit to their struggles" as a reader. Similarly, The Spectator's Michael Arditti specifically called John's credibility into question, asking how "a man believing in such an unforgiving Calvinistic code [could] be so indifferent to the prospect of his eternal damnation".

John of John was a finalist for the 2026 Orwell Prize for Political Fiction and the 2026 Kirkus Prize for Fiction. It was shortlisted for the 2026 Booker Prize. It was also selected for Oprah's Book Club.
