= Walter Lambert Muparutsa =

Zimbabwean Writer

Walter Lambert Muparutsa (23 March 1941 - 12 April 2012) was a Zimbabwean writer and pioneering theatre practitioner.

== Early life ==
Muparutsa grew up in the township of Mbare (then known as Harare) in the 1950s and 60s, where he developed his love for the arts. As an avid actor, he started Chiedza Drama Club, and was also active at the Anglican Young People's Association at St Michael's Church. His budding career in the arts was thus nurtured from these community institutions.

== Education ==
He attended the famous St Augustine's Mission, Penhalonga before he got his first job as an editorial assistant at the Rhodesia Literature Bureau.

== Theatre ==
In 1970, Muparutsa joined Sundown Theatre, a professional group that was based at Prince Edward School under John Haig. His first production was Wole Soyinka's Kongi's Harvest. From there, his career in theatre production and acting blossomed. He became a doyen of Zimbabwean theatre and mentored a generation of theatre practitioners in post-independence Zimbabwe through his Global Arts Trust where he was director. Besides, his immense contributions in contemporary Zimbabwean theatre, Muparutsa, was also a revered actor who made appearances in popular feature films such as Everyone's Child (1996), Kini & Adams (1997) and Yellow Card (2000). He also made a cameo appearance in Cry Freedom (1987).

== Legacy ==
Danai Gurira's Almasi Collaborative Arts established the Walter Muparutsa Fellowship for Artist of Excellence that provides talented young Zimbabwean dramatic artists with the opportunity to study in the United States. The inaugural recipient of the award was Tafadzwa Bob Mutumbi. In 2011 Tsitsi Dangarembga's International Images Film Festival (IIFF) for Women also introduced the Walter Muparutsa Award in the New Man Category. The Youth Cultural Arts Festival (Yocaf) also has a mentorship award named after the veteran theatre guru. Muparutsa has also been honoured posthumously by various festivals and institutions including the National Arts Council of Zimbabwe.
