= Burnt Sugar =

Burnt Sugar may refer to:

- Burnt Sugar (band), American improvisational music group
- Burnt Sugar (novel), 2019 novel by Avni Doshi
- Burnt Sugar (album), 2018 album by Gouge Away
