= Avni Doshi =

American novelist

- Born: 1982 (age 43–44); New Jersey, U.S.
- Education: Barnard College (BA); University College London (MA)
- Occupation: Writer
- Writing career
- Notable work: Girl in White Cotton (2019)
- Notable awards: Tibor Jones South Asia Prize (2013), Charles Pick Fellowship (2014)
- Website: www.avnidoshi.com

Avni Doshi (born in 1982) is an American novelist based in Dubai. She was born in New Jersey to immigrants from India. She received a BA in Art History from Barnard College in New York, and a master's degree in History of Art from University College London. Her debut novel, Girl in White Cotton, was published in India in 2019. In 2020, it was published in the United Kingdom under the title Burnt Sugar. The novel was shortlisted for the 2020 Booker Prize.

== Personal life ==
Doshi grew up in Fort Lee, New Jersey, but often spent the winter in Pune, India, where her mother's family lived. She lived in India for seven years during her mid-twenties, where she worked as a curator in various art galleries (such as Latitude 28 in Delhi and Art Musings in Mumbai).

She has two children.

== Bibliography ==
=== Novel ===
- Girl in White Cotton. New Delhi: Fourth Estate. 25 August 2019. ISBN 978-93-5357-138-2.
  - Burnt Sugar. London: Hamish Hamilton. 30 July 2020. ISBN 978-0-241-44151-0.
- The First House. London: Hamish Hamilton. 16 July 2026. ISBN 978-0-241-81908-1.

=== Journalism ===
- "A Feast of Love". Harper's Bazaar India. Vol. 4, no. 4 (May 2017 ed.). p. 98.
- "Open Road". Harper's Bazaar India. Vol. 4, no. 6 (July–August 2017 ed.). p. 127.
- "On finding dignity in failure". Elle India. 13 March 2018.
- "Write Choice". Elle India. Vol. 25, no. 9 (September 2019 ed.). pp. 94–95.
- "Free Style". Harper's Bazaar India. Vol. 6, no. 6 (November 2019 ed.). p. 113.
- "How Sense Writing Helped Me Overcome Writer's Block". The Curious Reader. 23 November 2019.
- Doshi, Avni; Roy, Devapriya (24 May 2020). "Two writers speak of returning to life once the pandemic is behind us". The Indian Express.
- "How does a lover of designer clothes cope when she no longer fits into them? Booker prize nominee Avni Doshi writes about how pregnancy triggered a wardrobe identity crisis". Style. Times Newspapers Ltd. 13 September 2020. pp. 98–99.
