= The Book of Not =

Novel by Tsitsi Dangarembga

- Author: Tsitsi Dangarembga
- Language: English
- Publisher: Ayebia Clarke Publishing Ltd
- Publication place: Zimbabwe
- English publication date: 2006
- ISBN: 0-9547023-7-9
- OCLC: 71365588
- Dewey Decimal: 823/.914 22
- LC Class: PR9390.9.D36 B66 2006
- Preceded by: Nervous Conditions
- Followed by: This Mournable Body

The Book of Not is a novel by Zimbabwean author Tsitsi Dangarembga, published in 2006. The novel is semi-autobiographical, set in colonial Rhodesia. The story is told from the perspective of Tambudzai as she attends a convent boarding school in Rhodesia. In The Book of Not, Tambu's story continues from when it previously left off in the prequel, Nervous Conditions (1988). In May 2018, the BBC named Nervous Conditions as one of the top 100 books that have shaped the world, listing the novel at number 66.

== Major themes ==
- Prejudice/Inequalities
- War/Revolution
