= Itai Dzamara =

Zimbabwean human rights activist

- Born: 7 August 1979; Mutoko, Zimbabwe Rhodesia
- Disappeared: 9 March 2015 (aged 35); Glen View, Harare, Zimbabwe
- Status: Missing for 11 years, 5 months and 22 days
- Education: Christian College of Southern Africa; University of Zimbabwe
- Occupation: Journalist
- Years active: 1999–2015
- Employer: The News Leader
- Spouse: Sheffra Dorica Dzamara
- Children: 2

Itai Dzamara (born 7 August 1979) is a Zimbabwean journalist and human rights activist. The creator and editor of the independent newspaper The News Leader, in 2014 he organised Occupy Africa Unity Square, a regular sit-in protest outside the government buildings in Harare that demanded accountability from Zimbabwe's leaders for their "failure to satisfy the needs of its people". Dzamara was forcibly disappeared in 2015, and the circumstances around his abduction, in addition to his whereabouts, remain unknown.

== Early life and education ==
Dzamara was born in Mutoko in what was then Zimbabwe Rhodesia, and attended school in Highview, Harare. He went on to study journalism and mass communication at Christian College of Southern Africa, graduating in 1999. In 2009, Dzamara established his own newspaper, The News Leader. Between 2002 and 2004 he studied business and economic journalism at the University of Zimbabwe in conjunction with the African Virtual University, and was studying law at the time of his disappearance in 2015. Dzamara quit his journalist job in October 2014 to focus on his activism.

Dzamara is married to Sheffra Dorica Dzamara, with whom he has two children, and lived in Harare at the time of his disappearance. His brother, Patson Dzamara, was also an activist; he died in 2020 of colon cancer.

== Activism ==
In 2014, Dzamara organised Occupy Africa Unity Square, a sit-in protest at Africa Unity Square in central Harare that demanded accountability from the government of Zimbabwe. The first protests occurred in October 2014, and attracted crowds of between fifty and a hundred people at the time of Dzamara's disappearance in March 2015. That same month, Dzamara hand-delivered a petition to the presidential office at the Munhumutapa Building, calling for the resignation of the then-President of Zimbabwe, Robert Mugabe, in addition to new elections. Dzamara subsequently wrote an article for Daily News in which he said he had been interrogated for several hours by officials who had strongly advised him to rescind his petition.

During a sit-in protest on 6 November 2014, Dzamara was assaulted by riot police and arbitrarily detained; he subsequently required treatment in the intensive care unit of a local hospital for his injuries. Dzamara's lawyer was also assaulted after identifying himself to police officers, and suffered from a broken wrist.

On 2 December 2014, Dzamara was abducted alongside two other protesters while participating in a march along Kwame Nkrumah Avenue in central Harare. The men were taken to the provincial offices of the ruling political party ZANU-PF, where they were physically assaulted and their possessions stolen, before being released without charge.

Dzamara's last public appearance was at an Occupy Africa Unity Square protest on 7 March 2015, two days before his disappearance. He gave a speech outside the Zimbabwean parliament calling for mass action in protest against Zimbabwe's deteriorating economy. In the months before his disappearance, Dzamara had expressed concerns to his friends that he was "not sure" how much longer he would be around, and urging them to be "prepared" to continue their protests without him.

== Disappearance and response ==
=== Abduction and investigation ===
On the morning of 9 March 2015, Dzamara was abducted by five unidentified men while at a barbershop in Glen View, a suburb of Harare. The men were alleged to have accused him of stealing cattle before handcuffing him and driving away with him in a white pick-up truck with concealed number plates. Dzamara's wife, Sheffra Dzamara, subsequently filed a missing person report the same day at Glen Norah Police Station. Local activists expressed concern that Dzamara had been abducted by state security agents. Dzamara's mobile phone was switched off shortly after his disappearance and has not been turned on since.

The following day, on 10 March 2015, Zimbabwe Lawyers for Human Rights approached the High Court in Harare to request that it order authorities to offer all available resources for the search for Dzamara. On 13 March, the High Court accepted this request, and also ordered authorities to advertise Dzamara's disappearance on state-owned media, as well as to provide weekly updates about the status of the investigation until Dzamara was located. A missing person appeal launched by Dzamara's legal team was published in several local newspapers. The Zimbabwean government suggested that Dzamara had staged the abduction.

On 11 March 2015, a group of protesters demanding Dzamara's release outside the Zimbabwean parliament clashed with police officers, leading to the deployment of tear gas to disperse the protest.

On 1 April 2015, the Irish human rights organisation Front Line Defenders issued a statement accusing the Zimbabwe Republic Police of failing to comply with the High Court's order to search for Dzamara. The ZRP made their first official statement on Dzamara's disappearance in 2018, appealing for information about his whereabouts three years after his disappearance. Following criticism about the timing of the statement, the ZRP subsequently released an additional statement in which it claimed that it had been searching for Dzamara "non-stop" since 2015. In 2024, the ZRP told Voice of America that they were unable to provide any updates concerning the status of the investigation.

In 2016, the then-Vice-President of Zimbabwe, Emmerson Mnangagwa, told the United Nations Periodic Review in Geneva that the Zimbabwean government was "actively searching" for Dzamara.

=== National and international response ===
The United States embassy in Zimbabwe called for a "thorough investigation" into Dzamara's disappearance. The European Union expressed its "deep concern" about his welfare.

Amnesty International has stated its belief that Dzamara was forcibly disappeared due to his activism and "outspoken criticism of the government". It has commemorated the fifth, ninth and tenth anniversaries of Dzamara's disappearance with renewed calls for an independent investigation under a judge-led Commission of Inquiry, with its regional director Tigere Chagutah accusing Zimbabwean authorities of failing to make any credible enquiries into establishing Dzamara's whereabouts.

In 2018, a documentary entitled "Where's Itai Dzamara?", detailing his activism and abduction, was broadcast on the BBC World Service.

Dzamara's wife Sheffra wrote an open letter to Mnangagwa in 2020 calling for his support with searching for her husband, and wrote about the difficulties she was experiencing trying to raise their two children alone. In 2024, she gave an interview with Voice of America in she criticised the "silence" about Dzamara's disappearance within Zimbabwe.

In 2023, to mark the eighth anniversary of Dzamara's disappearance, the Zimbabwe Human Rights Association released a statement commemorating him, and reiterated its calls for authorities to acknowledge publicly their role in Dzamara's disappearance.

In 2026, to mark the eleventh anniversary of Dzamara's death, Amnesty International Zimbabwe said that his family had experienced "years of anguish" waiting for answers, and called on the government to establish an "independent, judge-led commission of inquiry" to investigate his abduction. Zimbabwe Lawyers for Human Rights similarly called on Zimbabwean authorities to make "more efforts" to establish what happened to Dzamara.
