= Gabriel Krauze =

English author

- Born: London, United Kingdom
- Education: Queen Mary University
- Occupations: Short story author, novelist
- Writing career
- Language: English
- Notable work: Who They Was (2020)

Gabriel Krauze is a writer from London, known for his Booker Prize nominated debut Who They Was, an autobiographical novel detailing his life of crime and involvement in the gang culture of South Kilburn.

== Early life ==
Krauze was born in London in 1990 to a Polish immigrant family. He spent his adolescence living in the notorious South Kilburn housing estate where he was immersed in the gang culture of northwest London, ending up in a young offenders institute, while at the same time studying to obtain a degree in English Literature at Queen Mary University.

== Career ==
Krauze initially wrote several short stories for Vice, starting with his first, The Rape of Dina, in 2015.

=== Who They Was ===
He has published a long form work since then. 4th Estate won the rights to his debut novel in 2019 and the book was released in September 2020. Before it was even published and available to the wider public, Who They Was was longlisted for the Booker Prize.

Written entirely in the voice and slang of a young criminal from northwest London, and frequently dispensing with grammatical and syntactical conventions, the book is an autobiographical account of gang life in London as well as being an exploration of Nietzschean morality. The author has described his own work as being a "moral confrontation" with the reader, which doesn't seek to provide the constructed satisfaction of a narrative arc that ends in redemption.

The book is controversial, with frequent depictions of graphic violence, and one of the Booker Prize judges, author and poet Lemn Sissay, stated, "I had to have a shower after I read it." Reviews were nevertheless generally favourable, praising the unerring account of gang life and philosophical exploration of morality, with some criticising the explicit depictions of sex and ultraviolence. Kirkus Reviews summed the novel as a "gritty read for its gore, drugs, and profanity, but possessed of a raw and honest eloquence."

It was listed in Time's 100 Must-Read Books of 2021 and has received support from the likes of Irvine Welsh. Krauze has since been described by The New York Times as "an anomaly in British publishing", on account of his gang associations, criminal past, and his frequent wearing of diamond-encrusted grillz.

== Awards ==
"Magnificent in its relentless intensity and searing honesty, this is a new voice arriving fully formed and raring to go."

— The Booker Prize judges

His work of autobiographic fiction was longlisted for multiple awards, including the 2020 Booker Prize. It was among 12 books. In the reading guide, The Booker Prizes described it as an "urgent and electrifying work of autofiction: the first-hand account of a young man who has lived a life of violent crime, and who expresses it boldly, accurately, and at times even beautifully." They challenged readers to consider the significance of the novel's description of violence given that it reflected reality, the strong sense of place and how it's achieved, and reasons for why it was written in unconventional prose, incorporating slang on purpose.

The 2021 Dylan Thomas Prize had a record nine new writers on its longlist, including Krauze's "brutal novel based on a personal experience of London gang violence."

Year	Work	Award	Category	Result	Ref
2020	Who They Was	Booker Prize	—	Longlisted	
2021	Who They Was	Authors' Club Best First Novel Award	—	Shortlisted	
2021	Who They Was	Dylan Thomas Prize	—	Longlisted	

== Biblio ==
- —— (2020). Who They Was (hardcover 1st ed.). 4th Estate. ISBN 9780008374990.
