= Goromonzi West =

- Constituency for the National Assembly of Zimbabwe
- Province: Mashonaland East
- Region: Goromonzi District

Current constituency
- Created: 2008
- Number of members: 1
- Party: ZANU–PF
- Member(s): Beatrice Nyamupinga
- Created from: Goromonzi

Goromonzi West is a constituency represented in the National Assembly of the Parliament of Zimbabwe, located in Goromonzi District in Mashonaland East Province. Its current MP since the 2023 general election is Beatrice Nyamupinga of ZANU–PF.

== History ==
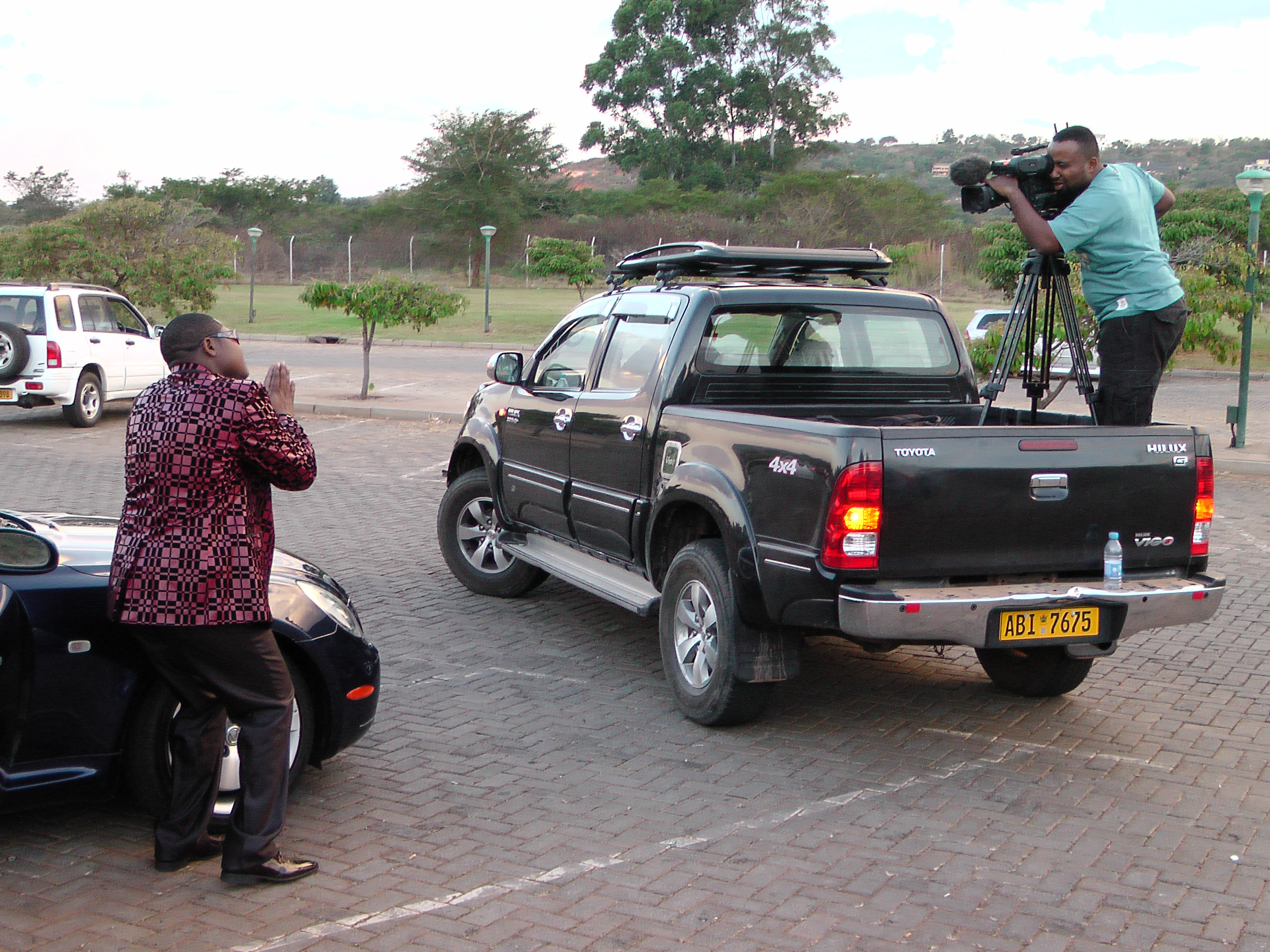
Energy Mutodi talking on camera, in 2011

It was created in the delimitation of 2008 from the former Goromonzi constituency, and covers Makumbe, Parirewa, Domboshava and Makumbe Mission. In the March 2008 parliamentary election the seat was won by the ZANU–PF candidate who defeated the MDC candidate from the Morgan Tsvangirai faction (MDC-T) by just 262 votes. In the 2013 election the ZANU-PF candidate, Biata B. Nyamupinga, was again challenged by Ian Makone (MDC-T) as well as by Wonder Chinamora (MDC). Nyamupinga retained her seat in the Assembly. A recount in Goromonzi West was conducted in April 2008, increasing ZANU-PF's total by one vote, from 6,193 to 6,194.

In the July 2018 parliamentary election the seat was won by the ZANU-PF candidate who defeated the MDC Alliance. The ZANU-PF candidate, Energy Mutodi, was again challenged by Tamborinyoka (MDC-A) as well as by Wonder Chinamora (MDC); Mutodi retained his seat in the Assembly.

== Members ==
Election	Name	Party
2008	Beatrice Nyamupinga	ZANU–PF
2013	Beatrice Nyamupinga	ZANU–PF
2018	Energy Mutodi	ZANU–PF
2023	Beatrice Nyamupinga	ZANU–PF

== Election results ==
General Election 2008: Goromonzi West
Party	Candidate	Votes	%	±%
ZANU–PF	Biata Beatrice Nyamupinga	6194	51.08	
MDC–T	Ian Muteto Makone	5931	48.92	
Majority		262	2.16	
Turnout		12124		

== See also ==
- List of Zimbabwean parliamentary constituencies
