= Everyone's Child =

- Directed by: Tsitsi Dangarembga
- Starring: Elijah Madzikatire; Momsa Mlambo; Walter Maparutsa
- Release date: 1995

Everyone's Child is a 1995 film directed by author Tsitsi Dangarembga who became the first black Zimbabwean woman to direct a feature film. The script is based on a story by Shimmer Chinodya and stars Elijah Madzikatire, Momsa Mlambo, and Walter Maparutsa. Produced by Zimbabwe's Media for Development Trust (MFD), Everyone's Child was originally conceived as a training video for community-based orphan care programs. Given the explosive growth of AIDS orphans on the continent--at the time of the project's development, predicted to reach 10,000,000 by the year 2000--it was determined that a feature film would have more of an impact in building awareness on the issue.

The soundtrack features 12 original songs by some of Zimbabwe's most popular musicians at the time, including Thomas Mapfumo, Leonard Zhakata and Andy "Tomato Sauce" Brown.

The film was criticised for unusual accents and for unsubtle story telling while the soundtrack received positive reviews.

== Plot ==
Focusing on the growing problem of children living in hardship - especially as a result of AIDS - the film follows the abrupt journey of two children into a world of adult responsibility. Itayi and Tamari are devastated following the death of both parents, shunned by family and friends, and left with nothing. Frustrated and in despair, Itayi tries his luck in the big city, leaving Tamari at home to look after herself and her younger brothers and sisters.
