= The New Wilderness =

2020 speculative climate fiction novel by Diane Cook

- Author: Diane Cook
- Genre: Climate fiction
- Publisher: Oneworld Publications
- Publication date: August 11, 2020
- Publication place: United States
- Pages: 384
- ISBN: 978-0-06233-313-1

The New Wilderness is a 2020 speculative climate fiction novel by American writer Diane Cook. The novel takes place in a future where climate change and pollution have devastated the environment. A mother and daughter leave the City by taking a part in a study that will reintroduce humans to the last area of protected land in the world.

== Background ==
Cook developed the idea for the novel while writing her 2014 short story collection Man v. Nature.

== Reception ==
The book received starred reviews from Booklist, Kirkus Reviews and Publishers Weekly. Téa Obreht in a review for The Guardian called it "a fast-paced, thrilling story to ask stomach-turning questions in a moment when it would benefit every soul to have their stomach turned by the prospect of the future she envisions. John Maxwell Hamilton, writing for Callaway Climate Insights, praised the book's prose and exploration of climate change. Lamorna Ash of the Times Literary Supplement also praised it.

Jonah Raskin, writing for The New York Journal of Books, offered a mixed review. Raskin praised "the finely drawn women characters" but critiqued it for being too long, noting that it "takes too many pages to get going, and wanders all over the place before it begins to dramatize the push and the pull between mother and daughter".

The book was shortlisted for the 2020 Booker Prize and longlisted for the 2021 Aspen Words Literary Prize.

== Television adaptation ==
In 2020, Warner Bros. Television Studios acquired the rights to adapt the book into a television series. Filmmaker Matt Reeves joined the production as an executive producer.
