= Susan Dangarembga =

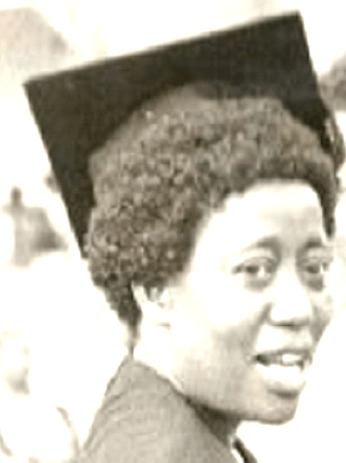
- Born: Susan Ngonyama; 1926
- Died: 2017 (aged 90–91); Zimbabwe
- Alma mater: University of Fort Hare; University College London
- Children: Tsitsi Dangarembga

Susan Dangarembga (1926 – 2017) was a Zimbabwean educator. She was the first black woman in colonial Southern Rhodesia to earn a university degree. She is the mother of novelist Tsitsi Dangarembga.

== Life ==
Ngonyama was born in 1926, the daughter of a Christian minister. She attended Goromonzi High School and took her O-Level in 1950, scoring the highest in the country among both black and white students. In her eulogy, Arthur Mutambara said "Without firing a single shot, going to detention or organising political resistance, as a high school student in 1950, Susan scored a major victory for the freedom and liberation of Zimbabwe."

She attended Fort Hare University in South Africa and graduated with a bachelor's degree in 1953. In the early 1960s, she and her husband earned master's degrees from University College, London. They returned to Zimbabwe where she was a teacher and her husband was the headmaster of Hartzell High School.

In 1983, she was the first female Public Service Commissioner in Zimbabwe.

Susan Dangarembga died in 2017 in Zimbabwe at the age of 91.

== Personal life ==
She married her classmate and future educator Amon Dangarembga and their daughter Tsitsi was born in 1959.
