= Energy Mutodi =

Zimbabwean politician

Energy Mutodi is a Zimbabwean businessman, politician, lawyer, academic, author and musician. He is ZANU–PF Member of Parliament for Goromonzi West and former Deputy Minister of Information, Publicity and Broadcasting Services.

== Early life ==
Energy Mutodi was born 4 August 1978 in Bikita to Johnson Mutodi and Vaina Chipepura. He attended primary school at Njaravani and Nyahunda Primary Schools before transferring to Chedutu Primary School in 1988 where he completed Grade 7 in 1991. He then attended secondary school at Tagona High School and Mashoko mission, and then proceeded to the University of Zimbabwe for his first degree, a Bachelor of Arts in War Studies and Geography. He also attained a Master of Business Administration and a Bachelor of Laws Honours Degree from the University of Zimbabwe In 2019, he obtained a PhD from Graduate School of Business at the University of Cape Town

== Career ==
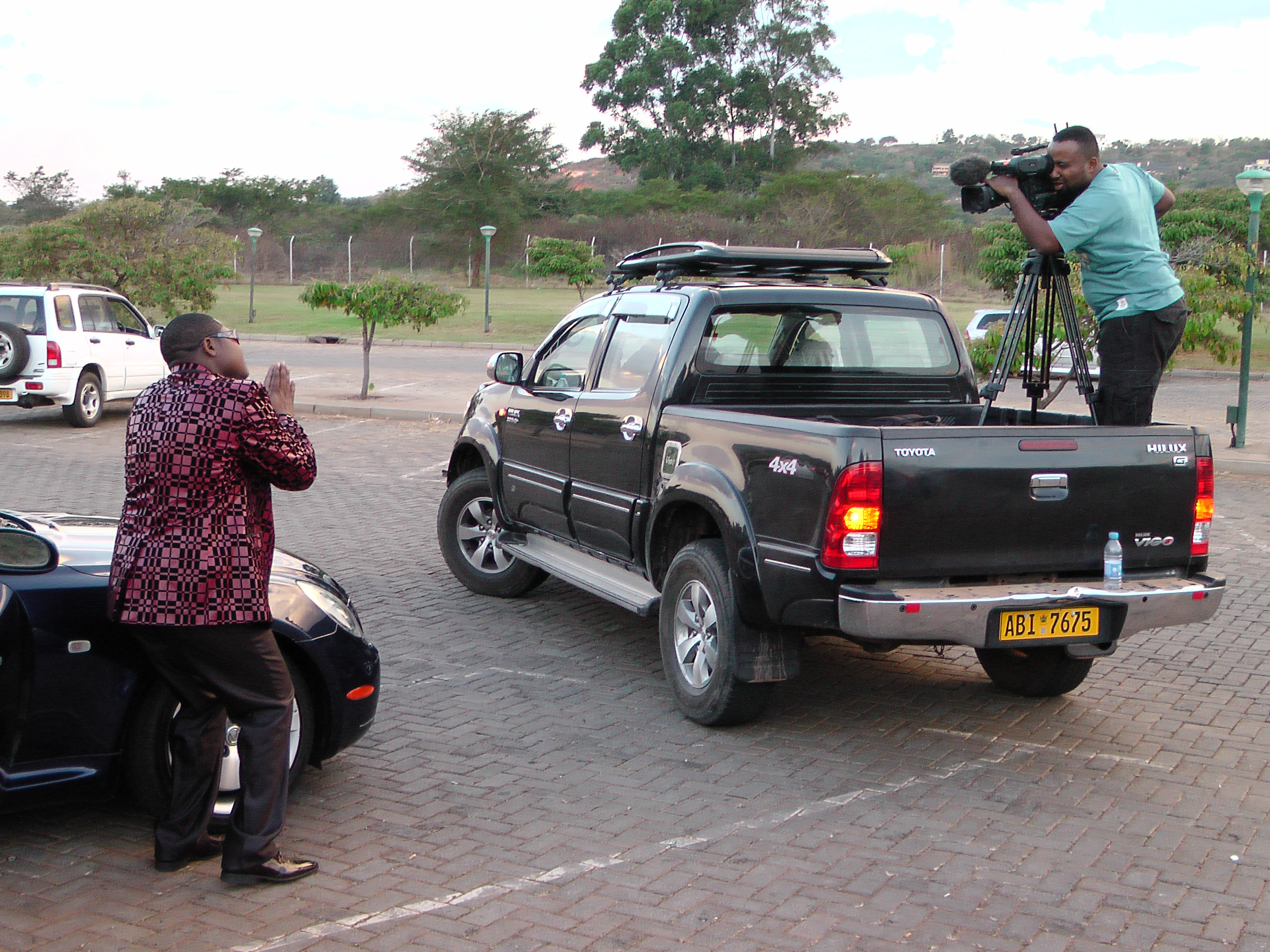
Energy Mutodi talking on camera, in 2011

Energy Mutodi started his career in 2002 when he joined the civil service as a school teacher at Chikangwe High School, teaching Ordinary and Advanced Level Geography. In 2004, Energy established a property development company called the National Housing Delivery Trust.

Then in 2006, Mutodi joined ZANU PF Chibvuti branch in Mashonaland East province. He was appointed Provincial Secretary for Economic Affairs. Two years later in 2009, he was appointed to the District first as Secretary for Transport and later as Secretary for Finance. During elections for the Provincial Executive in 2013, he became a member of the Mashonaland East Provincial Executive, a position he still holds.

In 2013, he was blocked from representing the party in the primary elections by Ray Kaukonde, the ZANU PF Provincial Chairman at the time. Kaukonde preferred Beatrice Nyamupinga, to run as MP in Goromonzi West.

In 2014, when Joice Mujuru came under attack due to ZANU PF factionalism, Energy Mutodi sided with a rival faction led by Emmerson Mnangagwa. Both factions were angling to succeed Robert Mugabe as President. Mujuru was accused of using black magic to dethrone Mugabe and Energy Mutodi took to Facebook to reveal the alleged ritual site Mujuru used to perform her rituals. Mujuru was later fired by Mugabe in 2014 and replaced by Emmerson Mnangagwa as Vice President.

During the period 2015 to 2017, Energy Mutodi wrote several Facebook articles in support of Mnangagwa as Mugabe’s possible successor. He predicted Mugabe would be removed from office in a coup if he failed to name Mnangagwa as his successor. Mutodi said Emmerson Mnangagwa was best fit to take over as President due to his loyalty and unwavering support to Robert Mugabe for more than half a Century. On 31 December 2016, when Robert Mugabe was on annual holiday in Singapore, Emmerson Mnangagwa was pictured together with Energy Mutodi holding a mug cup written “I AM THE BOSS” which reportedly angered Mugabe.

After Mnangagwa was allegedly poisoned at a rally addressed by Mugabe in Gwanda in 2017, Mutodi was later arrested for a crime of publishing falsehoods after he named two ministers as suspects. He had previously been arrested for predicting Mugabe’s downfall in a coup in an article in which he said the ZANU PF leader would be removed the Gaddafi way if he failed to name a successor on time. Mugabe was later removed in a coup in November 2017, and replaced by Emmerson Mnangagwa.

In elections that followed in August 2018, Energy Mutodi won the Goromonzi West seat as a Member of Parliament. He was subsequently named the Deputy Minister of Information, Publicity and Broadcasting Services by president Emmerson Mnangagwa.

In 2020, Energy Mutodi criticised Tanzanian president John Pombe Magufuli’s handling of the Coronavirus pandemic while seeking to praise president Mnangagwa for his Covid 19 measures. President Magufuli instead had rallied his country to undertake prayers against the pandemic while leaving the country open to normal business.

As a result of the criticism, Energy Mutodi was publicly censored by Foreign Affairs Minister Sibusiso B Moyo who said Mutodi’s public statements did not represent government position. However, Energy Mutodi responded to Moyo’s remarks leading to a disagreement that later got him fired. Both Foreign Affairs Minister Sibusiso Moyo and Tanzanian President John Pombe Magufuli later died from Covid 19 complications in 2021.

In September 2022, Energy Mutodi attended the state funeral of Elizabeth II in London after which he enrolled for a Master of Arts Degree in Global Conflict and Cooperation at the University of Birmingham School of Government in the United Kingdom.

In the 2023 Zimbabwean general election he was elected in Bikita South.

== Books ==
Mutodi has authored two textbooks that have been administered into the Zimbabwe secondary education system by the Ministry of Primary and Secondary Education.

- Advanced Physical Geography (2013)
- Advanced Human & Economic Geography (2022)

== Musical career ==
Energy Mutodi is also a rhumba musician, he started his music career in 2012 when he released his debut album.

=== Albums discography ===
- Simbi YaMudhara (2010)
- Sekawo Mbichana (2011)
- Magetsi Ngaabake (2012
- Kumasese (2011)
- Ndinokutendai
- Ndiri Shasha
- Shanga Yangu Yawa
- Yambiro
- Kuita Kuri Kwenyu
- Chimvuramabwe
- Dambakuro
- Ruvheneko
- Ndiri Munzira Kuuya
- Ndinorota Landalord
- Chidhedhedhe
- Mupedzanhamo
