= Beneath the Lion's Gaze =

2010 novel by Maaza Mengiste

- First edition (US)
- Author: Maaza Mengiste
- Language: English
- Set in: Addis Ababa
- Published: January 2010
- Publisher: W. W. Norton & Company (US); Jonathan Cape (UK)
- Publication place: United States
- Pages: 308
- ISBN: 978-0-393-07176-4
- Website: http://books.wwnorton.com/books/Beneath-the-Lions-Gaze/

Beneath the Lion's Gaze is a 2010 novel by Ethiopian-American writer Maaza Mengiste. It describes a family in Addis Ababa in 1974, living through the transition from emperor Haile Selassie to rule by the Derg. Favorably reviewed, Beneath the Lion's Gaze was a nominee for several prizes.

== Plot ==
Beneath the Lion's Gaze is set in Addis Ababa in 1974, at the end of the rule of Ethiopian emperor Haile Selassie and the beginning of the military junta replacing Selassie's rule, the Derg. It follows the family of a doctor, his dying wife and their two sons through the political upheaval.

== Reception ==
Writing in The New York Times, Lorraine Adams says, "Mengiste understands well the unique position her country occupies in Africa’s postcolonial landscape. And her uncanny rendition of Selassie’s last moments reveals her sensitivity to the twisted singularity of his magnetism." In The Guardian, Pushpinder Khaneka named it to a list of best books about Ethiopia, saying, "This compassionate, tightly woven tale immediately draws the reader into its unfurling domestic and political drama. It’s an impressive literary debut." In The New Yorker, Francesca Mari said, "The real marvel of this tender novel is its coiled plotting, in which coincidence manages to evoke the colossal emotional toll of the revolution."

=== Awards ===
- Shortlist, 2010 Flaherty-Dunnan First Novel Prize
- Finalist, 2011 Dayton Literary Peace Prize
- Finalist, 2011 Indies Choice Book of the Year Award in Adult Debut
