= Pauline Uwakweh =

Nigerian writer and academic

Pauline Ada Uwakweh
- Born: Uvuru in Aboh-Mbaise, Imo State
- Education: Owerri Girls Secondary School, University of Port Harcourt, University of Calabar and Temple University
- Occupations: writer and academic

Pauline Ada Uwakweh is a Nigerian writer and academic. Writing as Pauline Onwubiko, she published Running for Cover (1988), a children's novel giving a child's-eye view of the Nigerian Civil War. She is a Professor of Literature in the English Department at North Carolina A&T State University. Her specialism is African writing and literature from the African diaspora, particularly women's writing.

She earned her doctorate degree from Temple University, her M.A from the University of Calabar, and her B.A. from the University of Port Harcourt. Her specialization is in postcolonial African and African Diaspora women’s literature.

Uwakweh is co-author of the book, Engaging the Diaspora: Migration and African Families (2013), and editor of African Women Under Fire: Literary Discourses in War and Conflict (2017). Her works appear in critical books and journals of African literature. She is a Fellow of the Carnegie African Diaspora Fellowship Program.

== Life ==
Pauline Onwubiko was born in Uvuru, Aboh-Mbaise, Imo State. She attended Owerri Girls Secondary School and in 1982 she graduated with a BA in literature from the University of Port Harcourt. She gained a master's in English and literary studies from the University of Calabar, and a PhD from Temple University. Before moving to North Carolina A&T, she taught in the Department of African American Studies at the University of Cincinnati and the Department of English and Literary Studies at the University of Calabar. She was a Carnegie African Diaspora Fellow in 2016.

Uwakweh has written literary criticism on a range of writers, including Toni Morrison, Chinua Achebe, Buchi Emecheta, Nawal El-Saadawi, Alice Walker, Gloria Naylor, Tsitsi Dangarembga, Cyprian Ekwensi, Ama Ata Aidoo, Chimamanda Adichie and Goretti Kyomuhendo. She co-edited and introduced a 2013 collection on immigration and African families. Her own chapter looked at marriage, motherhood and immigration in the writing of Buchi Emecheta and Chimamanda Adichie. In 2017 she edited and introduced a collection on war and African women, in which her own contribution considered Grace Akallo's memoir, Girl Soldier, and Susan Minot's novel Thirty Girls.

== Works ==
- Running for Cover. Owerri, Imo State: KayBeeCee Publications. Republished by Africa First Publishers, 2010.
- (ed. with Jerono P. Rotich and Comfort O. Okpala) Engaging the diaspora: migration and African families. Lanham: Lexington Books, 2013.
- (ed.) African Women Under Fire: Literary Discourses in War and Conflict. Lanham: Lexington Books, 2017.
