= This Mournable Body =

Novel by Tsitsi Dangarembga

- Author: Tsitsi Dangarembga
- Language: English
- Publisher: Graywolf Press
- Publication place: United States
- English publication date: 2018
- ISBN: 978-1-55597-812-9
- Preceded by: The Book of Not

This Mournable Body is a novel by Tsitsi Dangarembga which was published by Graywolf Press on 7 August 2018. It is the third book in a trilogy, following Nervous Conditions (1988) and The Book of Not (2006).

== Plot ==
The novel follows the life of Tambudzai after The Book of Not. She struggles to attain the success, that she had hoped for in her years of schooling, and is eventually forced to return to her family home for work. The narrative explores the toxic joint effects of colonialism and capitalism on a person and a nation.

== Awards ==
The novel was shortlisted for 2020 Booker Prize. It was also a finalist for the St. Francis College Literary Prize in 2019.

Soon after the novel's publication, in 2021, Dangarembga won the PEN Pinter Prize.

== Critical reception and reviews ==
This Mournable Body was described by Alexandra Fuller of The New York Times as "another masterpiece," and by Novuyo Rosa Tshuma of The Guardian as "magnificent ... another classic".

It has been reviewed by Kirkus Reviews, Red Pepper, The Times, The Masters Review, The Times Literary Supplement, The Daily Telegraph, Literary Review, Verve, Washington Independent Review of Books, Star Tribune, Radio New Zealand, Tydskrif vir Letterkunde, World Literature Today, The Straits Times, The Michigan Daily, Chicago Tribune, The Irish Times, Daily Trust, The Wire, The New Yorker, Zyzzyva, Publishers Weekly and The Gazette.
