= Douglas Stuart (writer) =

Scottish fashion designer and novelist (born 1976)

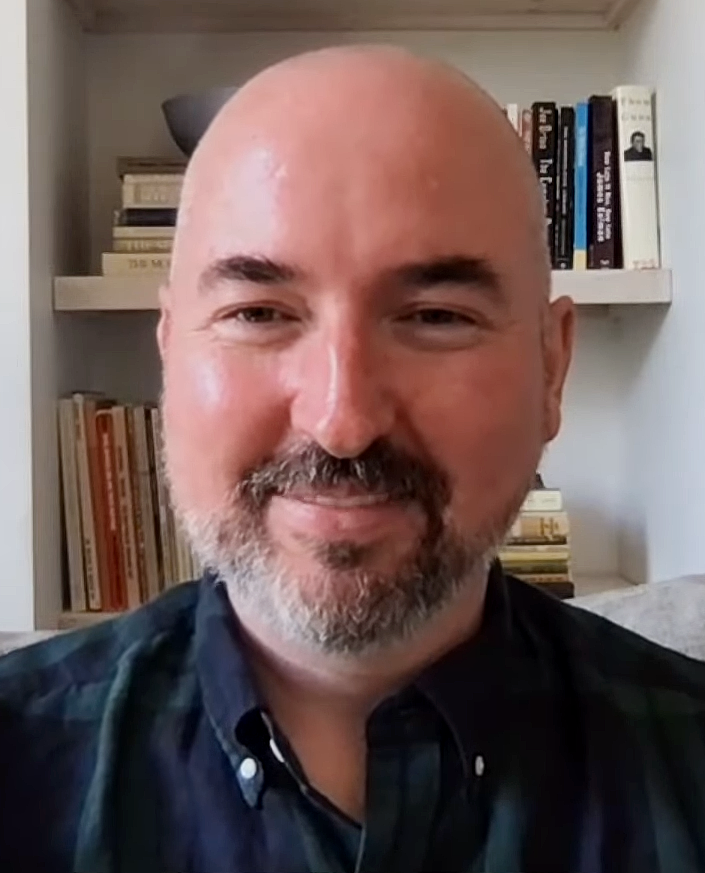
- Stuart in 2021
- Born: 31 May 1976 (age 50); Sighthill, Glasgow, Scotland
- Citizenship: British; American
- Education: Scottish College of Textiles (BA); Royal College of Art (MA)
- Occupations: Novelist; fashion designer
- Notable work: Shuggie Bain (2020); Young Mungo (2022); John of John (2026)
- Spouse: Michael Cary
- Awards: Booker Prize (2020); Sue Kaufman Prize for First Fiction (2021)
- Website: douglasdstuart.com

Douglas Stuart (born 31 May 1976) is a Scottish-American fashion designer and writer. Born in Glasgow, Scotland, he studied at the Scottish College of Textiles and London's Royal College of Art, before moving at the age of 24 to New York City, where he worked in fashion design while also beginning to write. His debut novel, Shuggie Bain, was awarded the 2020 Booker Prize. His second novel, Young Mungo, was published in April 2022. His third novel, John of John, was published in May 2026 and was shortlisted for the 2026 Booker Prize.

== Early life and education ==
Douglas Stuart was born in Sighthill, a housing estate in Glasgow, Scotland. He was the youngest of three siblings. His father left him and his family when Stuart was young, and he was raised by a single mother who was battling alcoholism and addiction. His mother died from alcoholism-related health issues when he was 16. Shuggie Bain was inspired by his relationship with his mother. After his mother's death, he lived with his older brother before moving into a boarding house when he was 17. Writing on Literary Hub about working-class living in the late 1970s and 1980s, Stuart notes that he grew up in a house without books and surrounded by poverty, after Thatcher-era economic policies had created issues of mass unemployment, alcoholism, and drug abuse in west Scotland.

He received a bachelor's degree from the Scottish College of Textiles (now Heriot-Watt University) and a master's degree from the Royal College of Art in London. He has no formal education in literature, and notes that while he wanted to study English literature in college, he was discouraged from choosing the subject by a teacher who mentioned that it would "not suit someone from his background", resulting in Stuart studying textiles instead.

== Career ==
Stuart moved to New York City at the age of 24 to begin a career in fashion design. He worked for many brands, including Calvin Klein, Ralph Lauren, Banana Republic, and Jack Spade, for more than 20 years. Stuart started to write his first novel while he was working 12-hour shifts as a senior director of design at Banana Republic. Prior to his first novel being published, Stuart's works were featured in The New Yorker and Literary Hub.

When Stuart wrote his first novel, Shuggie Bain, the book was rejected by 32 US publishing companies and 12 in the UK before it was finally sold to American independent publisher Grove Atlantic, who published it in hardcover on 11 February 2020. Shuggie Bain was later published in the United Kingdom by the Picador imprint of Pan Macmillan. As of April 2022, Shuggie Bain has sold more than 1.5 million copies globally.

Shuggie Bain won the 2020 Booker Prize. Stuart became the second Scottish author to win the Booker Prize in its 51-year history, after it was awarded in 1994 to James Kelman for How Late It Was, How Late, a book Stuart has credited with changing his life, since it was "one of the first times he had seen his people and dialect on the page." Speaking at the Booker Prize award ceremony, Margaret Busby, chair of the panel, noted that the book was destined to be a classic and described it as a "moving, immersive and nuanced portrait of a tight-knit social world, its people and its values."

Shuggie Bain was also longlisted for the 2021 Andrew Carnegie Medal for Excellence in Fiction, and was a finalist for the 2020 Center for Fiction First Novel Prize, the 2020 Kirkus Prize, and the 2020 National Book Award for Fiction. Shuggie Bain was chosen both as Debut Book of the Year and Overall Book of the Year at the 2021 British Book Awards.

The novel received generally favourable reviews, including in The Observer, The New York Times, The Scotsman, The Times Literary Supplement, and The Hindu. The book was praised for its authentic portrayal of post-industrial working-class Glasgow of the 1980s and early 1990s, and also for Stuart's capture of the "wry, indefatigable Glaswegian voice in all its various shades of wit, anger and hope."

In November 2020, Stuart revealed that he had finished his second novel, initially titled Loch Awe. The book is a love story between two young men, also set against the backdrop of post-industrial 1990s Glasgow, with its territorial gangs and divisions across sectarian lines. The book is about toxic masculinity and the violence that can stem from its pressures on working-class boys. The novel was published under the title Young Mungo by Grove Press on 5 April 2022, and by Picador on 14 April 2022. It was described by Oprah Daily as "a beautiful novel about family love and the dangers of being different in a violent, hyper-masculine world," and by Kirkus Reviews as "romantic, terrifying, brutal, tender, and, in the end, sneakily hopeful."

In 2021, Stuart received an honorary doctorate from Heriot-Watt University.

In November 2022, it was confirmed that Shuggie Bain was to be made into a television drama series, adapted by Stuart, to be filmed in Scotland and broadcast on BBC One and iPlayer.

Stuart was the subject of a film profile entitled "Douglas Stuart: Love, Hope and Grit", first shown in November 2022 in Alan Yentob's BBC One television arts documentary series Imagine.

In June 2023, Stuart was interviewed by British-Albanian singer Dua Lipa at the Hay Literary Festival. The conversation was mainly regarding his debut novel, Shuggie Bain.

In 2026, Stuart published his third novel, John of John, which was selected for Oprah's Book Club. The novel is a finalist for the Orwell Prize in the Political Fiction category. In June 2026, John of John was selected as the monthly book club pick for Roxane Gay's Audacious Book Club. In September 2026, the novel was shortlisted for The Booker Prize. It was a finalist for the 2026 Kirkus Prize for Fiction.

== Personal life ==
Stuart holds dual British and American citizenship. He lives in East Village, Manhattan, with his husband, Michael Cary, an art curator at the Gagosian Gallery.

== Selected awards ==
Year	Nominated work	Award	Category	Result	Ref.
2020	Shuggie Bain	National Book Critics Circle Awards	John Leonard Prize	Shortlisted	
2020	Shuggie Bain	Los Angeles Times Book Prize	Art Seidenbaum Award for First Fiction	Shortlisted	
2020	Shuggie Bain	National Book Award	Fiction	Shortlisted	
2020	Shuggie Bain	Kirkus Prize	Fiction	Finalist	
2020	Shuggie Bain	Center for Fiction First Novel Prize		Shortlisted	
2020	Shuggie Bain	Booker Prize	—	Won	
2020	Shuggie Bain	Waterstones Scottish Book of the Year	—	Won	
2021	Shuggie Bain	Sue Kaufman Prize for First Fiction	—	Won	
2021	Shuggie Bain	British Book Awards	Overall Book of the Year	Won	
2021	Shuggie Bain	British Book Awards	Debut Book of the Year	Won	
2021	Shuggie Bain	Independent Publisher Book Awards	Best Regional Fiction – Europe	Bronze	
2021	Shuggie Bain	Andrew Carnegie Medals for Excellence	Fiction	Longlisted	
2021	Shuggie Bain	Orwell Prize	Political Fiction	Longlisted	
2021	Shuggie Bain	Rathbones Folio Prize	—	Longlisted	
2021	Shuggie Bain	Polari Prize	First Book	Shortlisted	
2021	Shuggie Bain	PEN/Hemingway Award for Debut Novel	—	Shortlisted	
2021	Shuggie Bain	Dayton Literary Peace Prize	Fiction	Shortlisted	
2021	Shuggie Bain	Lambda Literary Awards	Gay Fiction	Shortlisted	
2023	Young Mungo	Andrew Carnegie Medals for Excellence	Fiction	Longlisted	
2023	Young Mungo	Polari Prize	Book of the Year	Shortlisted	
2026	John of John	Orwell Prize	Political Fiction	Nominated	
2026	John of John	Booker Prize	—	Shortlisted	
2026	John of John	Kirkus Prize	Fiction	Finalist	

== Bibliography ==
=== Novels ===
- —— (2020). Shuggie Bain: A Novel. New York: Grove Press. ISBN 978-0-8021-4804-9. UK, Picador.
- —— (2022). Young Mungo: A Novel. New York: Grove Press. ISBN 978-0-8021-5955-7. UK, Picador.
- —— (2026). John of John: A Novel. Grove Press. ISBN 978-0-8021-6719-4. UK, Picador.

=== Short fiction ===
- —— (13 January 2020). "Found Wanting". The New Yorker.
- —— (14 September 2020). "The Englishman". The New Yorker.
- —— (12 April 2026). "A Private View". The New Yorker.

=== Essays ===
- —— (10 February 2020). "Poverty, Anxiety, and Gender in Scottish Working-Class Literature". Literary Hub.
