= Diane Cook =

American writer

- Education: Columbia University
- Occupation: Writer
- Writing career
- Notable works: The New Wilderness (2020), Man v. Nature (2015)
- Website: www.dianemariecook.com

Diane Marie Cook is an American writer currently based in New York. Her debut novel, The New Wilderness (2020), was shortlisted for the 2020 Booker Prize.

== Biography and career ==
After studying and writing fiction at university, Cook attended the Salt Institute for Documentary Studies in Portland, Maine, as a member of their first Radio cohort in 2000. She began her radio career as an intern, then producer at This American Life. She won the 2012 Calvino Prize for fabulist fiction.

She attended Columbia University for her MFA and a few years later published her first book, the short-story collection Man V. Nature. It was a finalist for the 2015 Guardian First Book Award, the Believer Book Award, and the Los Angeles Times Book Prize Art Seidenbaum Award for First Fiction.

Her debut novel, The New Wilderness (2020), was shortlisted for the 2020 Booker Prize, with an announced television series adaptation with Cook writing and producing along with director Matt Reeves.

Cook's writing has appeared in Harper's, Tin House, Granta, and other publications, and her stories have been included in the anthologies The Best American Short Stories and The O. Henry Prize Stories. In 2020 she was the Leeds Lit Fest "International Writer in Residence".

She has taught writing and literature at Columbia University and at the University of Michigan's New England Literature Program, in which students and teachers live and study together in a rustic camp, foregoing all technology and traditional classroom methods.

Cook was the recipient of a 2016 fellowship from the National Endowment for the Arts.

She lives in Brooklyn, New York, with her husband, daughter and son.

== Bibliography ==
=== Novel ===
- The New Wilderness (2020)

=== Collection ===
- Man V. Nature (2015)
