= Young Mungo =

2022 novel by Douglas Stuart

- US first edition cover
- Author: Douglas Stuart
- Audio read by: Chris Reilly
- Working title: Loch Awe
- Language: English
- Genres: Coming-of-age; gay novel
- Publisher: Grove Press
- Publication date: 5 April 2022
- Publication place: New York
- Media type: Print (hardcover)
- Pages: 400
- ISBN: 978-0-8021-5955-7
- OCLC: 1260664224
- Dewey Decimal: 813/.6
- LC Class: PS3619.T828 Y68 2022

Young Mungo is a 2022 novel by Scottish-American writer Douglas Stuart. It was published by Grove Press on 5 April 2022 and by Picador on 14 April 2022. The novel follows Mungo Hamilton, a teenager navigating a life of poverty and parental neglect in the early 1990s Glasgow. When the character falls in love with a boy named James, he must confront the homophobia, toxic masculinity, and religious conflicts of the society of his time. It is Stuart's second novel, following his Booker Prize-winning debut Shuggie Bain (2020). The novel was critically acclaimed and was chosen as one of the best books of the year by publications such as The Washington Post, Time, Reader's Digest, The Telegraph, and Vanity Fair.

== Plot ==
The novel opens with Mungo Hamilton, a 15-year-old Scottish teenager, leaving on a trip with two men his mother met at an Alcoholics Anonymous meeting, St. Christopher and Gallowgate, who take him fishing at a Highland loch to learn how to be a man. Months earlier, Mungo is living at home being cared for by his sister Jodie, with the constant threat of being taken away by social services in the absence of his mother, Maureen. One day, he meets James Jamieson, a Catholic boy who lives in a flat behind his and who has built a dovecote to raise pigeons. The two become friends and soon develop a romance, their first relationship that does not involve constant acts of violence.

James reveals to Mungo that he is planning to leave home, but Mungo asks him to wait until he turns 16 so he can go with him. Mungo's older brother Hamish forces him to come to a fight against Catholics from another neighbourhood, even though James asks him not to. Mungo does not hit anyone but ends up badly wounded, deciding to look for James to ask him to leave together without waiting any longer. Hamish finds them together and attempts to murder James by setting him on fire. Mungo intervenes, and Hamish takes him back home, where he tells their mother what happened. Maureen is horrified by the possibility that Mungo is gay, so she plans the fishing trip with which the novel opens.

During the fishing trip, Mungo worries about St. Christopher and Gallowgate as he learns they have both recently been imprisoned. On a shopping trip, he calls his mother and asks to come home. On the second night, the men get drunk and rape Mungo, who later learns they were imprisoned for child molestation. The following day, while Gallowgate goes shopping for groceries, Mungo goes fishing with St. Christopher and manages to drown him in a river. He hides the body, but heavy rain washes it into the loch, and the next day, Gallowgate finds the corpse. After sinking the body, Gallowgate tries to drown Mungo, who kills him with a knife that Hamish had given him. Mungo returns alone to Glasgow and meets up with his worried family at his mother's street food workplace. After Mungo's phone call, his mother had reported him missing to the police and Jodie had contacted James to ask if he had heard from Mungo. Across the road, Mungo sees James, bandaged and wounded, obviously about to leave Glasgow. The police arrive after finding Gallowgate's body and ask for "Mungo". Hamish poses as Mungo. Mungo and James stare at each other, and Mungo walks towards James.

== Background and publication ==
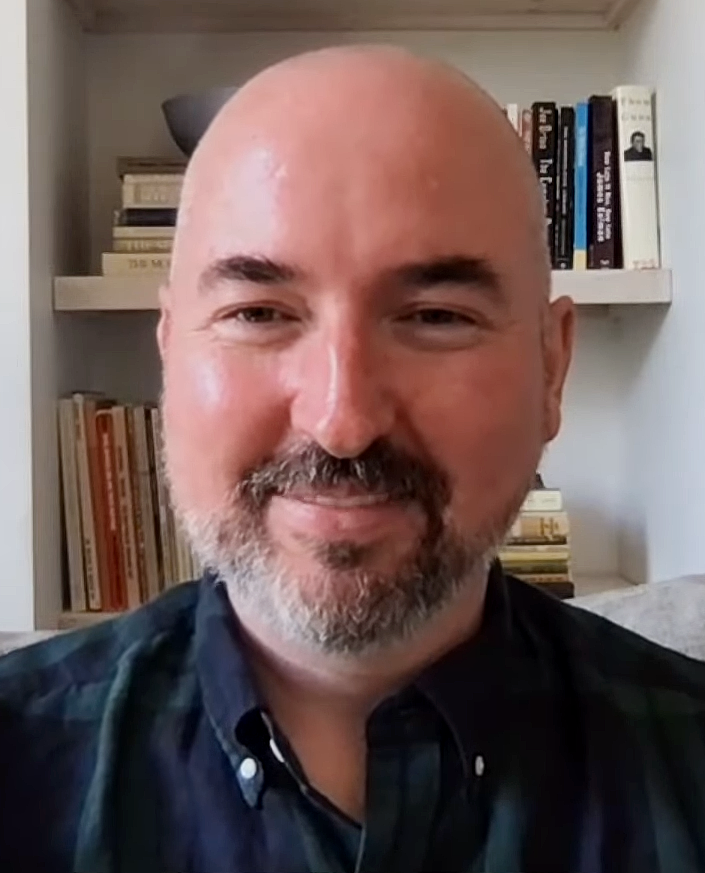
Douglas Stuart in 2021

Stuart began writing Young Mungo in 2016, after setting aside the finished manuscript of his first novel, Shuggie Bain, due to frustration that he was unable to find a publisher for it. He finished the novel in 2020, before winning the Booker Prize for his first novel. At the time, the novel was tentatively titled Loch Awe and was described by Stuart in an interview as, "a love story between two young men who are separated by territorial gangs, on opposing sectarian lines." The title Loch Awe referenced the fishing trip that Mungo takes in the novel and, according to the author, was changed to Young Mungo to denote the protagonist, the same approach as in Shuggie Bain, as Stuart claimed the two works formed a single "tapestry".

The novel was published on 5 April 2022 by the American publisher Grove Press, with a cover designed by artist Christopher Moisan showing a teenage boy submerged underwater, photographed by Kyle Thompson. The British edition was published by Picador on 14 April 2022, with a cover depicting the well-known photograph "The Cock (Kiss)" by German photographer Wolfgang Tillmans.

== Critical reception ==
The novel was critically acclaimed and was included on several best books of the year lists, including those of The Washington Post, Reader's Digest, Time, Vanity Fair, The Globe and Mail, The Telegraph, Vogue, the Los Angeles Review of Books, and Time Out. It was longlisted for the Andrew Carnegie Medal for Excellence in Fiction and the Scottish Highland Literary Award. Kirkus Reviews, in a starred review, wrote that "again this author creates characters so vivid, dilemmas so heart-rending, and dialogue so brilliant that the whole thing sucks you in like a vacuum cleaner." The starred Publishers Weekly review called the novel "astonishing" and Stuart's prose "stellar", with particular praise for the novel's ending, which the magazine described as a "punch to the heart".

Johanna Thomas-Corr, in her review for The Sunday Times, called it a "rich and affecting group portrait of loneliness", but also "richly abundant" with "colourful characters" and Dickensian with its "moral vision that's expansive and serious while being savagely funny." She criticised the novel's narrative structure and Stuart for "rearranging the core elements of Shuggie Bain (alcoholism, rape, neglect, homophobia, domestic abuse) with the same family dynamics too." Alex Preston, in a review for The Observer, was equally positive in his appreciation of the novel and of Stuart, whom he called a "prodigious talent". Preston focused in particular on the love story between Mungo and James and stated that he cried at the end of the story. The protagonist's love affair was also praised by David Canfield, a reviewer for Vanity Fair, who also noted the detailed moment-to-moment descriptions of the plot.

The novel's prose was praised in Ron Charles's review in The Washington Post, who called Stuart's style poetic, the author a "genius" and the novel a "masterful family drama". Johnathan Self, in an article in The Critic, also praised Stuart's prose and called the novel "Dickensian fiction". He further asserted that it was more developed in style and theme than Shuggie Bain. Hillary Kelly of the Los Angeles Times also compared the novel's plot to the literature of Charles Dickens, specifically David Copperfield, and stated that it was striking how successful Stuart was in developing the narrative arc and conveying the character's emotions.

Molly Young for The New York Times noted the "mad grandeur" of the novel and the "beauty" of the language employed by Stuart, while also criticising the descriptions of the characters' emotions, since the plot, according to Young, gave the reader enough information to understand them without needing to reiterate them. She also spoke negatively of the violent events in the story and stated that some readers might feel like "misery tourists". The violence of the plot was also criticised by Kevin Quinn of Post Magazine, who said it risked overshadowing Stuart's literary skill, while praising the construction of Mungo's inner life.

== Television adaptation ==
On 22 March 2023, it was announced that Young Mungo will be "adapted...for the BBC", with Douglas Stuart writing the adaptation. The adaptation is set to be produced by A24, who also acquired the television rights for Douglas's previous novel, Shuggie Bain.

== Translations ==
- Dutch: Mungo. Translated by Kitty Pouwels and Josephine Ruitenberg. Amsterdam: Nieuw Amsterdam. 7 April 2022. ISBN 9789046829417.
- Swedish: Unge Mungo. Translated by Eva Åsefeldt. Stockholm: Albert Bonniers Förlag. 27 April 2022. ISBN 9789100196165.
- Norwegian: Unge Mungo. Translated by Hilde Stubhaug. Oslo: Gyldendal Norsk Forlag. 19 May 2022. ISBN 9788205563469.
- Danish: Unge Mungo. Translated by Signe Lyng. Copenhagen: Politiken. 30 August 2022. ISBN 9788740078916.
- Italian: Il giovane Mungo. Translated by Carlo Prosperi. Milan: Mondadori. 27 September 2022. ISBN 9788804749738.
- French: Mungo. Translated by Charles Bonnot. Paris: Éditions Globe. 25 January 2023. ISBN 9782383611653.
- Catalan: Un lloc per a en Mungo. Translated by Núria Busquet Molist. Barcelona: Edicions de 1984. ISBN 9788418858352
- Spanish: Un lugar para Mungo, lit. 'A Place for Mungo'. Translated by Francisco González López. Barcelona: Random House. ISBN 9788439741442.
- German: Young Mungo. Translated by Sophie Zeitz. Berlin: Hanser Berlin. 20 February 2023. ISBN 9783446275829.
- Polish: Młody Mungo. Translated by Maciej Studencki. Poznań: Wydawnictwo Poznańskie. 12 April 2023. ISBN 9788367616690.
- Finnish: Nuori Mungo. Translated by Laura Jänisniemi. Helsinki: WSOY. 21 April 2023. ISBN 9789510492529.
- Portuguese: Um Lugar para Mungo, lit. 'A Place for Mungo'. Translated by Nuno Quintas. Lisbon: Alfaguara. 25 September 2023. ISBN 9789897849183.
- Hungarian: Az ifjú Mungo. Translated by Gábor Csordás. Budapest: Park Könyvkiadó. 23 September 2024. ISBN 9789633559499.
- Turkish: Genç Mungo. Translated by Duygu Aykın. Istanbul: Can Yayınları. 4 February 2025. ISBN 9789750764127.
