= South Kilburn =

Housing estate in Kilburn, London

Coordinates: 51.530°N 0.197°W

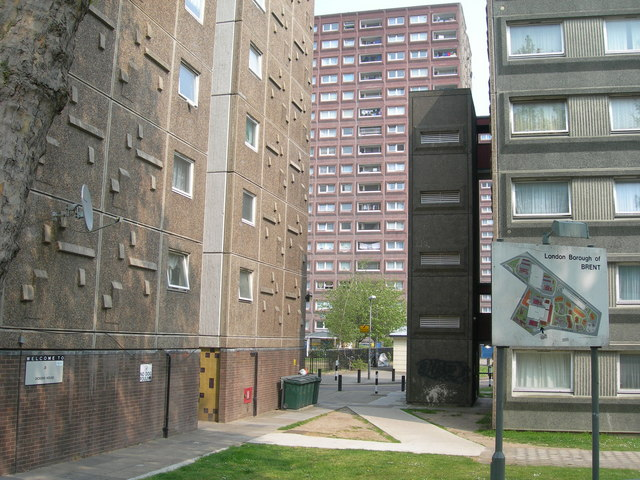
View of South Kilburn tower blocks

South Kilburn is a large housing estate in Kilburn, in the London Borough of Brent. Typical of brutalist 1960s designs of public housing in the United Kingdom, it is characterised by high-density housing in low-rise flats and 11 concrete tower blocks. It was approved in 1959 and extended in 1963. This scheme was further developed in the late 1960s and early 1970s; redevelopment occurred during the 2010s. The population is predominantly Afro-Caribbean and Pashtun.

== Geography ==
South Kilburn is within the London Borough of Brent, to the east/southeast of Queens Park tube station, immediately south of Kilburn Park tube station, north of Maida Hill, and to the west of the Paddington Recreation Ground. Carlton Vale is the numbered street that separates the northern and southern parts of the estate.

== Redevelopment ==
In 2014 a massive redevelopment project was started by the London Borough of Brent to redevelop the estate, starting with the demolition of two of the 18-storey housing blocks on the estate. This has continued with the creation of new housing blocks built to modern design quality and energy efficiency standards and owned by several different housing associations along with infill developments owned by the local council. Per the plans for this regeneration scheme, the redevelopment so far has seen a net loss of social housing units as most of the new blocks replacing the demolished buildings include a number of flats for social rent ("council housing") along with flats for sale on the private market. The Gloucester House and Durham Court section of the regeneration, begun by Telford Homes housing association in 2017, will see the demolition of 209 flats and their replacement with 235 new-build units, nearly half of which (133) will be for private sale. The construction of market-rate flats for sale has made the area popular with real estate investors and home-buyers who see the area's central location and numerous transport links as attractive features.

In May 2019, inhabitants of the newly built Merle Court (opened in 2012) were forced to move due to design problems in the building. Several months later the mandatory balloting procedure of residents for Phase 2 of the South Kilburn redevelopment scheme was met with a campaign by some local residents to extend the ballot to all 8,000 residents, many of whom, in anticipation of future demolition, are settled on the estate as residents in temporary accommodation, and who, Brent Council argues, do not need to be included under the Greater London Authority's rules on estate regeneration balloting.

== Crime on the estate ==
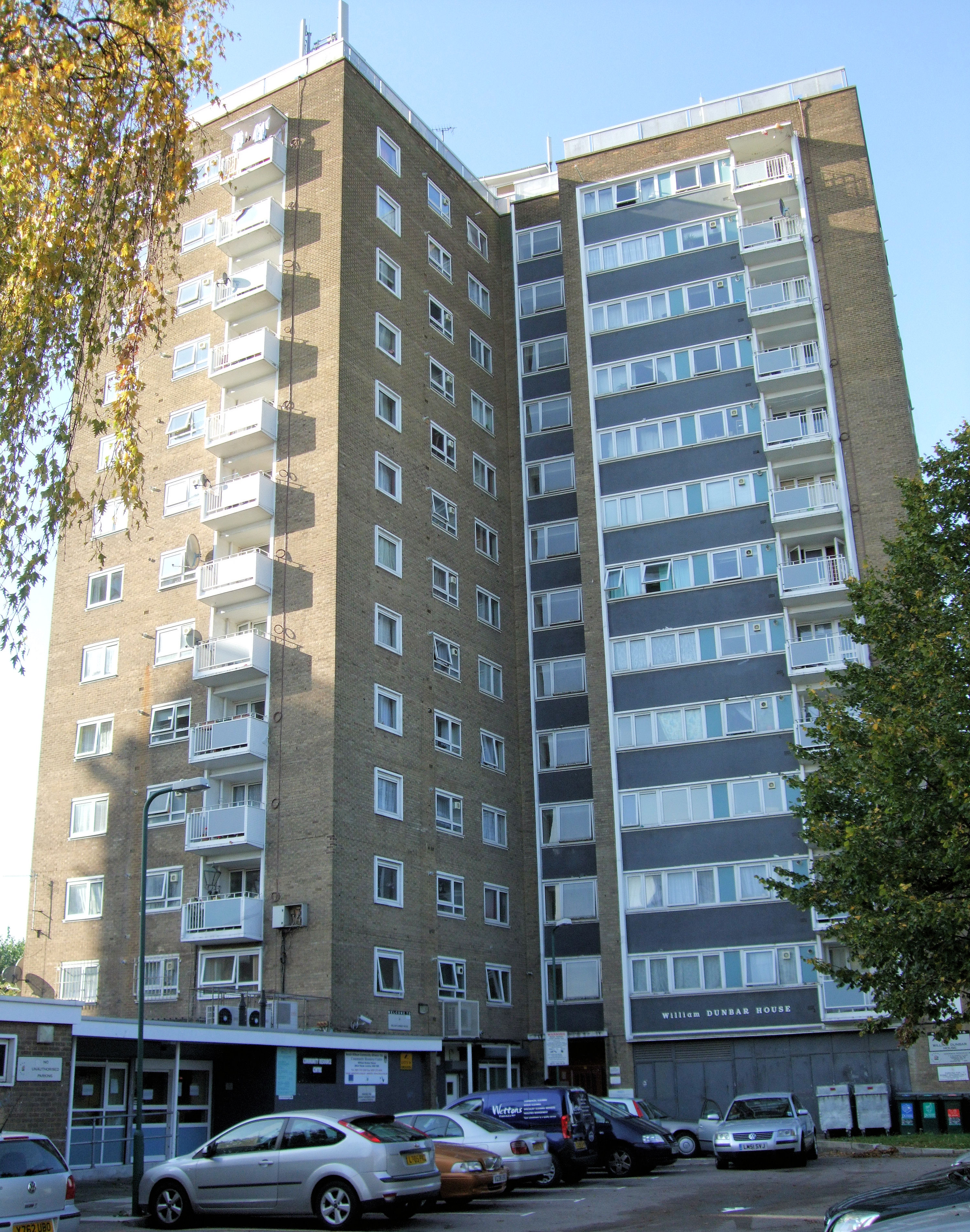
William Dunbar House

South Kilburn has long been plagued by crime, the streets and blocks that characterise the dense sprawl of housing being the site of numerous shootings and a drug trade controlled by various gangs, including the notorious £R. The gangs of South Kilburn have been known to have an ongoing rivalry with gangs from Ladbroke Grove in particular the Mozart Estate and the Kensal Green boys, which has resulted in numerous shootings, stabbings and kidnappings. The rivalry has been reported to be a typical "postcode war",

=== 2007 raid ===
On 18 April 2007, 500 police, including firearms officers, raided the estate in a series of dawn raids after a months-long sting operation where members of a gang known as F.A.C. (Fire Arms Cartel) had been selling guns to undercover police officers. Numerous arrests were made resulting in prosecutions with claims that the police had 'smashed' an 'untouchable gang'. Although crime levels subsequently fell to some extent, there were similar raids in 2011 when 250 police officers once again stormed the South Kilburn Estate in a co-ordinated drugs raid. The gang rivalry between the South Kilburn and Mozart estates has continued with numerous gang fights as well as the shooting of innocent victim Daniel Omari Smith, gunned down in 2010 in a KFC in a case of mistaken identity.

In 2013, Sabrina Moss was killed in a takeaway shop on Kilburn High Road while celebrating her 24th birthday, when she was hit by bullets from a MAC-10 submachine gun, intended for South Kilburn gang members from the F.A.C. gang who were also in the takeaway. Her friend as well as two South Kilburn gang members were also hit by bullets and injured in the attack which was perpetrated by members of the Kensal Green Boys gang who were involved in a long-running feud with gangs from the South Kilburn Estate.

=== Mohanna Abdhou murder ===
In May 2017, Mohanna Abdhou, a 20-year-old woman, was shot and killed while hanging out with friends on the South Kilburn Estate outside Dickens House. The intended targets were probably a group of young men from the estate who managed to escape being shot while Mohanna, who had no involvement with gangs, was tragically hit by a bullet in the stomach and died. Once again, this killing was connected by police and prosecutors to the tit-for-tat violence between local gangs in and around the area. The gang war between the Mozart and South Kilburn estates continues despite community and local government action.

The area continues to be affected by its history of gang violence and drug dealing.

=== Housing corruption ===
A scheme started by the South Kilburn Partnership to redevelop the estate was accused of corruption in 2010, when £50 million allocated for the estate's redevelopment went missing.

== In popular culture ==
The critically acclaimed novel Who They Was, written by Gabriel Krauze, recounts his life in South Kilburn, and his experiences around the South Kilburn Estate with gangs, drugs and crime.

== See also ==
- Stonebridge Estate
