= Nervous Conditions =

1988 novel by Tsitsi Dangarembga

- First edition
- Author: Tsitsi Dangarembga
- Language: English
- Genre: Bildungsroman
- Publisher: The Women's Press (London)
- Publication date: 1988
- Publication place: Zimbabwe
- Pages: 204
- ISBN: 0-7043-4100-X
- OCLC: 21118465
- LC Class: PR9390.9.D36 N47 1988
- Followed by: The Book of Not

Nervous Conditions is the 1988 debut novel by Zimbabwean author Tsitsi Dangarembga. The semi-autobiographical novel focuses on the story of a Shona family in post-colonial Rhodesia during the 1960s, and centers on the themes of race, colonialism, and gender.

It was the first book published by a black woman from Zimbabwe in English. Nervous Conditions won Best Book of the Commonwealth Writers' Prize (Africa section) in 1989. The title is taken from the introduction by Jean-Paul Sartre to Frantz Fanon's The Wretched of the Earth (1961).

Nervous Conditions is the first book of a trilogy, with The Book of Not (2006) as the second novel in the series, and This Mournable Body (2018) as the third.

== Plot summary ==
Tambu is the main character of the novel. The novel opens with the news that Tambu’s older brother, Nhamo, had just died. Tambu is not upset about this because Nhamo studied at a missionary school away from home with his uncle Babamukuru and his family. The only thing Tambu desires is to attend school, but her family is very poor and does not have enough money to pay her school fees. Tambu’s uncle, Babamukuru, and his family came to visit the homestead. Because of Babamakuru’s success, he is worshiped whenever he comes to visit. During the visit, Babamukuru suggests that Tambu should take Nhamo's place and attend the missionary school by his house. Upon arriving, she soon becomes close to her cousin Nyasha and completely focuses on her studies. During term break, everyone returns to visit the family back in the homestead. Tambu does not want to go back as she is much more comfortable living with Babamukuru.

Towards the end of the term, there is an exam administered at Tambu’s school. This exam is to test the students and offer them an opportunity to study at a well known missionary school. Tambu excels on the exam and is offered a scholarship to attend this well known school. In the new school Tambu is introduced to many cultural changes; however, she remains resistant to the changes. As always she is fully focused on her studies. Consequently, she remains cautious of her daily situations and nervous of the conditions that surround her.

== Characters ==
- Tambu: Jeremiah and Ma'Shingayi's daughter. Tambu is the novel's main character and narrator of the story. Her desire for an education and to improve herself seem strong enough to overcome just about anything. She is very hard on herself, and always strives to do her best and make the correct decisions.
- Nyasha: Tambu's first cousin, Babamukuru and Maiguru's daughter. Her desire to be independent gets her into a lot of trouble, including numerous arguments with her father. Her time in England showed her a different life, and she is having trouble assimilating back into Rhodesian society, suffering from bulimia, an eating disorder.
- Babamukuru: Tambu's uncle, and the head of her family. He is married to Maiguru and has a daughter, Nyasha, and a son, Chido. His actual name is mentioned in the novel only as Mr Sigauke; he is otherwise referred to by clan names in the Shona language. Tambu always calls him "Babamukuru", which means "father's older brother"; Tambu's father's generation call him "Mukoma", which means "oldest brother". A well-educated man, he is the dean of the missionary school. As head of the family, he feels responsible for the rest of his extended family; he also regards them as insufficiently hard-working, which makes him rather authoritarian towards them. By contrast, he shows subservience to the people who helped him get his education.
- Maiguru: Nyasha's mother. Maiguru is a well-educated woman who is forced to be reliant on her husband, Babamukuru. She is frustrated because while she has the potential to provide for herself, she is prevented from doing so by patriarchial forces.
- Chido: Babamukuru and Maiguru's son. Because Chido is Babamukuru's son, he received a good education, but succumbed to the customs of the white colonists.
- Jeremiah: Babamukuru's brother and Tambu's father. Jeremiah received very little education and is barely able to provide for his family. He acts grateful to Babamukuru for the education he provided his children with.
- Lucia: Maa'Shingayi's sister. Lucia stays relatively unknown during the course of the novel. She is believed to have had many affairs with wealthy men. She is a very independent woman, and is determined to educate herself and not fall into the normal roles of women in her society.
- Ma'Shingayi: Tambu's mother. After Nhamo's death, when Tambu goes to the mission, she becomes very resentful of Babamukuru for taking another one of her children to his school.
- Nhamo: Tambu's brother. As the eldest son in the family, Nhamo is chosen to go to the mission school. After being at the school, he feels he is superior to the rest of his family, and takes no part in their daily tasks. Eventually, he starts going home from the mission less and less until his death.

== Themes ==
Gender

Gender is one major theme expressed in the novel. The Rhodesian female characters face oppression on the basis of gender, and this is a driving force behind many of the story arcs in the novel.

Colonialism

Colonialism is another major theme in the novel — it is another driving force behind many of the plot points, including the fixation on (Western) education and Nyasha's internal struggles with race and colonialism. Additionally, Tambu's trajectory starting with her early education and ending with her acceptance at the nun's school reveals the colonial nature of that scholarship, since the African students were not treated the same as the white Western students.

== Reception ==
Nervous Conditions has mostly received positive reviews, making it a prominent African and Zimbabwean literary work. The Africa Book Club recommends Nervous Conditions, claiming Dangarembga’s work to be, "a thought-provoking novel that packs a huge number of complicated ideas into a simple and engaging story." Nervous Conditions was awarded the Commonwealth Writers' Prize in 1989, and has since been translated into a number of languages. It has been praised both within and outside of Africa as a prominent contribution and advocate of African feminism and post-colonialism. The novel has been described as an "absorbing page-turner" by The Bloomsbury Review, "another example of a bold new national literature" by the African Times and "a unique and valuable book" by Booklist. Finally, Pauline Uwakweh describes how Nervous Conditions emphasizes that "[Racial and colonial problems are explored] as parallel themes to patriarchal dominance because both are doubtless interrelated forms of dominance over a subordinate social group. Dangarembga has, indeed, demonstrated a keen knowledge of the problems of her Rhodesian society in particular, and Africa in general. Her vision as a writer stresses that awareness and courage are the blueprint to exploding its contradictions." Overall, Nervous Conditions is recognized as a major literary contribution to African feminism and postcolonial literature.

In May 2018, the BBC named Nervous Conditions as one of the top 100 books that have shaped the world. The novel was the 66th book on the list.
