= Strip road =

A strip road is a dirt road with two narrow, parallel strips of asphalt, one for each wheel. Roads of this kind are found in parts of Southern Africa and parts of Asia.

When two cars on a strip road approach each other from opposite directions, each is expected to move away from the centre of the road and use only one strip until the other car has passed.

Asphalt strip roads were built in Southern Rhodesia, as Zimbabwe was then known, from 1933 onwards as a relatively inexpensive way of opening up the country for development. Asphalt was chosen after an early experiment with concrete strip roads proved too costly.

By 1938, strip roads covered a total distance of 1,890 kilometres, including an unbroken stretch linking the capital, Salisbury (today called Harare), with the southern border town of Beitbridge. By 1945 the total exceeded 3,300 kilometres.

After World War II, many of the strip roads were replaced with full-width asphalt roads but some remain, particularly in more remote areas.

In neighbouring Zambia, the phrase "strip road" sometimes refers to a road with a single strip of asphalt in the middle, wide enough for one vehicle.
