= Girl in White Cotton =

Novel by Avni Doshi

- Cover of first edition (India)
- Author: Avni Doshi
- Audio read by: Vineeta Rishi
- Language: English
- Set in: Pune, India
- Publisher: Fourth Estate (HarperCollins India)
- Publication date: 25 August 2019
- Publication place: New Delhi
- Media type: Print (hardcover)
- Pages: 288
- ISBN: 978-93-5357-138-2
- OCLC: 1112137808

Girl in White Cotton is the debut novel by Avni Doshi, an American writer of Indian origin. Doshi wrote the novel over the course of seven years. It tells the story of a troubled mother-daughter relationship in Pune, India. The novel was first published in India in August 2019. It was published in the United Kingdom under the title Burnt Sugar in July 2020.

The novel was shortlisted for the 2020 Booker Prize.

== Background ==
"Art writing felt like a farce; the text could never stand up to the objects themselves, never hold its own weight. I was interested in exploring something else – writing that existed in conversation with, or in resistance to, the art itself. Fiction became my form of rebellion."

— Avni Doshi

The novel was written by Doshi over the course of seven years. In 2012, while working as a curator and art writer in Mumbai, Doshi wrote her first draft of the novel in order to meet the deadline for the Tibor Jones South Asia prize for an unpublished manuscript. She won the prize in a unanimous decision by its five judges. She began writing the novel in Pune. Doshi credits a moment while in her grandmother's flat in Pune when a distortion in a mirror warped her reflection, and she saw two different people in her face. The same day, she wrote what would later become the first fragment of the novel. Doshi has said, "The images in my mind were vivid. A mother and a daughter, a woman with a split reflection, a drawing partially erased." She continued her writing of the novel in Mumbai, the United States and the United Arab Emirates, where she started and completed the final draft. Doshi struggled to complete the novel, writing eight different drafts over seven years. The drafts varied drastically and were written with different points of view and voices. Doshi described the process as a "dark and difficult journey" of fighting self-doubt. The novel was partially inspired by her mother's familial connection to the Osho ashram in Pune, created in 1976 by the guru Bhagwan Shree Rajneesh. However, Doshi has stressed that the novel is not autobiographical and that the relationship at its centre is not based on her relationship with her own mother. Doshi was also partly inspired by Sheila Heti's autobiographical novel Motherhood (2018).

== Synopsis ==
In Pune, Antara must care for her ageing mother Tara who is experiencing memory loss from what is suspected to be early onset Alzheimer's disease. Tara lived a rebellious and careless life, abandoning her marriage to join an ashram and pursure a romance with a guru. Antara was neglected and abused by her mother as a child. Antara reckons with the contempt she holds for her mother as she is forced to care for her.

"I would be lying if I said my mother's misery has never given me pleasure" is the opening sentence of the novel.

== Themes ==
Doshi described "obsession, memory and the boundaries of the self" as being the novel's main themes. Particularly, how memory is "co-authored" by the people who collectively remember specific stories and continue to restate and rearrange them, altering each other's memories in the process. The theme of the fallibility of memory was partly inspired by Doshi's own grandmother who was diagnosed with Alzheimer's disease while she was writing the novel. Her mother felt she was "going mad" while being with her grandmother. The concept of how caretakers often "question their own hold on reality" influenced Doshi's writing. Doshi admits a parallel between Antara's preoccupation with Alzheimer's and her own, saying, "She makes sense of the disease through drawing it, and I made sense of it through writing this novel."

== Publication ==
The novel was first published under the title Girl in White Cotton in India in 2019. It was acquired by editor Rahul Soni and published in hardcover format by Fourth Estate, an imprint of HarperCollins India, on 25 August 2019. Doshi received offers from three publishers immediately after her literary agent presented the novel for sale. Shortly after its publication, the novel was recommended by Vogue India and was praised by several writers, including Fatima Bhutto, Elizabeth Gilbert, Olivia Sudjic, Tishani Doshi, Janice Pariat, Diksha Basu and Sharlene Teo. On 13 September 2019, British publisher Hamish Hamilton announced it had bought the world English volume, audio and serial rights to the novel and would publish it in summer 2020. On 30 July 2020, the novel was published under the title Burnt Sugar in paperback format in the United Kingdom by Hamish Hamilton. An audiobook narrated by Vineeta Rishi was released by Penguin the same day. Doshi was also interviewed the same day on BBC Radio 4's Front Row programme to coincide the novel's UK publication. The novel was published in the United States by The Overlook Press on 26 January 2021, also under the title Burnt Sugar.

== Reception ==
The novel's opening sentence was singled out and praised by many critics for its strength and for being memorable.

Saudamini Jain of Hindustan Times praised Doshi's characterization in the novel, writing, "Their feelings and resentments — even in alien situations — are uncannily identifiable." Esha Datanwala of Scroll.in gave the novel a rave review, praising its narrative structure and Doshi for knowing "exactly how to make her characters human, how to describe Pune and Bombay to elicit nostalgia, how to cut through the frivolity of modern writers and say exactly what is appropriate." Rohan Manoj of The Hindu agreed, praising Doshi's "crisp prose" and her "powers of observation" regarding human relationships and the "physical reality" of both Pune and Mumbai. Paromita Chakrabarti of The Indian Express called it a "hard, unflinching look at familial bonds and how they damn us and unravel us." Urvashi Bahuguna of India Today praised the novel for revealing "the limited power afforded to women and the price they pay for acting in their own interest."

Francesca Carington of The Daily Telegraph gave the novel a perfect 5 out of 5 stars rating, praising Doshi's "feverish prose" and calling it a "corrosive, compulsive debut." In his review for The Times, John Self called it "a good debut, but by declaring it one of the year's very best novels, the Booker judges might have given it as much a burden as an accolade." Alex Peake-Tomkinson of The Times Literary Supplement praised the rapid changes in tone of Doshi's prose for enlivening the novel but largely criticized it for capitulating to an "urge to shock", calling the novel "needlessly depressing" at times. Elle Hunt of The Guardian called it "an unsettling, sinewy debut, startling in its venom and disarming in its humour from the very first sentence".

=== Accolades ===
The novel was shortlisted for the 2020 Booker Prize. Judges of the prize called the novel an "utterly compelling read" that "examines a complex and unusual mother-daughter relationship with honest, unflinching realism – sometimes emotionally wrenching but also cathartic, written with poignancy and memorability."

It was longlisted for the 2019 Tata Literature Live! First Book Award for Fiction.

== Adaptations ==
On 5 November 2021, Variety reported that Indian filmmaker Deepa Mehta, known for her Elements trilogy, would direct a film adaptation of the novel, with Ben Silverman's Propagate Content producing the film and Carmen Nasr writing the screenplay.

A theatre adaptation is also in development by The Lot Productions, who acquired the theatre rights and plan the play to premiere in London during their 2023 season.
