= Shuggie Bain =

2020 novel by Douglas Stuart

- First edition cover
- Author: Douglas Stuart
- Audio read by: Angus King
- Cover artist: Photograph by Peter Marlow (first edition cover)
- Language: English; Scots
- Genre: Bildungsroman; gay novel
- Set in: Glasgow, 1981–1992
- Publisher: Grove Press (US), Picador (UK)
- Publication date: 11 February 2020 (US)
- Publication place: United States
- Media type: Print (hardback and softback), e-book, audio
- Pages: 448
- Awards: Booker Prize (2020)
- ISBN: 978-0-8021-4804-9 (US first edition hardcover)
- OCLC: 1105711179
- Dewey Decimal: 813/.6
- LC Class: PS3619.T828 S58 2020
- Website: www.douglasstuart.com

Shuggie Bain is the debut novel by Scottish-American writer Douglas Stuart, published in 2020. It tells the story of the youngest of three children, Shuggie, growing up with his alcoholic mother Agnes in 1980s post-industrial working-class Glasgow, Scotland.

The novel was awarded the 2020 Booker Prize, making Stuart the second Scottish winner of the prize in its 51-year history, following James Kelman in 1994. Shuggie Bain was also a finalist for the 2020 National Book Award for Fiction, the 2021 Dayton Literary Peace Prize, and the 2020 John Leonard Prize for Best First Book from the National Book Critics Circle. It was also selected as a notable book by the American Library Association on their 2021 ALA Notable lists for adult fiction. It is written in English, but dialogue is in Scots. As of April 2022, the novel had sold more than 1.5 million copies globally.

== Plot ==
The novel opens in 1992, when Hugh "Shuggie" Bain is 15 years old. He lives alone in a boarding house in Glasgow, working shifts at a supermarket deli, and aspires to be a hairdresser. He leaves work, placing tin cans of fish in his bag.

In 1981, five-year-old Shuggie is living in a tenement flat in Sighthill with his maternal grandparents, Wullie and Lizzie; his mother, Agnes Bain; his father, Hugh "Shug" Bain; his half-brother, Leek; and his half-sister, Catherine. Shuggie's father is mostly absent, working as a cab driver and having affairs with other women. Agnes is a beautiful woman often compared to Elizabeth Taylor, but she is unfulfilled by her life and takes to drinking.

The following year, Shug moves the family into a council flat in Pithead for families of workers of the local mine. He ultimately abandons the family there, leaving them to live with Joanie Micklewhite, the dispatcher of his cab company. Agnes desires a life of glamour, taking pride in her appearance, but her unhappiness drives her reliance on alcohol. Meanwhile, Shuggie is bullied at school and in the neighbourhood for not fitting in and for being effeminate. Shuggie often misses school to act as his mother's carer during her hangovers.

Agnes's parents die and her daughter marries young, moving to South Africa. Agnes's alcoholism worsens, and she is taken advantage of by abusive men. Her future looks brighter when she starts going to Alcoholics Anonymous meetings and takes a job as a petrol-station attendant. She manages to stay off drink completely for a year, during which time she meets a cab driver named Eugene, whom she begins to date. Eugene often drinks in front of her during dinners. He eventually convinces Agnes to drink a glass of wine, and she relapses into alcoholism. Put off by her alcoholism, Eugene leaves her. After a sexual assault at a party she attends when drunk, Agnes spirals downwards and loses her job. She makes suicide attempts over the next few years.

Agnes's alcoholism continues to alienate her from her children. In one of her drunken rages, she kicks Leek out of the house. Despite her behaviour, Shuggie maintains an unwavering devotion to her. The two of them move to a more inner-city neighbourhood, and Agnes promises to stop drinking, but unable to change their circumstances, their relationship becomes strained as Shuggie grows older. In a drunken stupor, Agnes dies after inhaling her own saliva.

Back in 1992, Shuggie gives the tins of fish to his friend Leanne, who gives them to her homeless alcoholic mother.

== Publication and sales ==
Douglas Stuart wrote Shuggie Bain over a period of a decade, while balancing the demands of his successful job in fashion design. The manuscript was rejected by at least 30 publishers before it was purchased by the American independent publisher, Grove Atlantic. The novel was first published in the United States in hardcover by Grove Press on 11 February 2020. Later, the Picador imprint of Pan Macmillan published it in the United Kingdom first as a softback open market edition (OME) on 20 February 2020, and as a hardcover on 6 August 2020. By April 2021, rights had been sold for the book in 38 languages, including Dutch, Finnish, Georgian, Korean, Marathi, Mongolian, Portuguese, Serbian, Tamil, Turkish, Ukrainian and Vietnamese. The translations have been financed through grants from the Publishing Scotland Translation Fund with assistance from Creative Scotland.

The book's initial publication was impacted by the COVID-19 pandemic. Grove Press shipped approximately 7,000 copies to bookstores, but only around 1,000 hardcover copies sold in the first two months of its publication, according to NPD BookScan data. In late 2020, the book received a renewal of attention when it was nominated for numerous literary awards. In response, Grove pushed the publication of the paperback edition up from December to 13 October 2022. As of October 2020, Grove had printed 30,000 copies. The novel went to the top of the Los Angeles Times bestsellers list and to number 3 on the New York Times list. As of April 2022, the novel had sold more than 1.5 million copies globally.

The Grove Press cover features a photograph by Peter Marlow. Douglas Stuart expressed a fondness for the photograph, saying that "it captures perfectly the fierce love that Shuggie has for his troubled mother". The Picador cover features a photograph by Jez Coulson, shot in Easterhouse, Glasgow (about which Stuart tweeted on 13 August 2020: "I was instantly struck by the power of Jez's photo the moment I saw it").

=== Editions in English ===
- Shuggie Bain (hardback). New York: Grove Press. 11 February 2020. ISBN 978-0-8021-4804-9.
- Shuggie Bain (softback) (Air Iri OME ed.). London: Picador. 20 February 2020. ISBN 978-1-5290-1928-5.
- Shuggie Bain (hardback). London: Picador. 6 August 2020. ISBN 978-1-5290-1927-8.
- Shuggie Bain (softback). New York: Grove Press. 13 October 2020. ISBN 978-0-8021-4850-6.

=== Translated editions ===
- Greek: Σάγκι Μπέιν, romanized: Sánki Béin. Translated by Stavroula Argyropoulou. Athens: METAIXMIO. 30 June 2020. ISBN 978-618-03-2605-5.
- Dutch: Shuggie Bain. Translated by Inger Limburg and Lucie van Rooijen. Amsterdam: Nieuw Amsterdam. 12 January 2021. ISBN 978-90-468-2757-4.
- Italian: Storia di Shuggie Bain, lit. 'Story of Shuggie Bain'. Translated by Carlo Prosperi. Milan: Mondadori. 19 January 2021. ISBN 978-88-04-73527-4.
- Swedish: Shuggie Bain. Translated by Eva Åsefeldt. Stockholm: Albert Bonniers Förlag. 1 March 2021. ISBN 978-91-0-018247-2.
- Danish: Shuggie Bain. Translated by Signe Lyng. Copenhagen: Politiken. 18 May 2021. ISBN 87-400-6917-6.
- Polish: Shuggie Bain. Translated by Krzysztof Cieślik. Poznań: Wydawnictwo Poznańskie. 16 June 2021. ISBN 978-83-66839-11-3.
- French: Shuggie Bain. Translated by Charles Bonnot. Paris: Globe. 18 August 2021. ISBN 978-2-38361-000-7.
- German: Shuggie Bain. Translated by Sophie Zeitz. Munich: Hanser. 23 August 2021. ISBN 978-3-446-27108-1.
- Georgian: შაგი ბეინი. Translated by Tamar Japaridze. Tbilisi. Sulakauri Publishing. ISBN 978-9941-37-395-4.
- Portuguese: A História de Shuggie Bain, lit. 'The Story of Shuggie Bain'. Translated by Débora Landsberg. Rio de Janeiro: Intrínseca. 1 October 2021. ISBN 978-65-5560-276-0.
- Bulgarian: Шъги Бейн, romanized: Shugi Beyn. Translated by Kaloyan Ignatovski. Sofia: Labirint. 24 November 2021. ISBN 978-619-7055-98-6.
- Turkish: Shuggie Bain. Translated by Duygu Akın. Istanbul: Can Yayınları. 11 January 2022. ISBN 978-975-07-5593-4.
- Ukrainian: Шаґґі Бейн, romanized: Shaggi Beyn. Translated by Ella Yevtushenko. Kyiv: Bookchef. 24 January 2022. ISBN 978-966-993-729-2.
- Slovak: Shuggie Bain. Translated by Milan Kopecký. Bratislava: IKAR. 26 July 2022. ISBN 978-80-551-8251-3.
- Slovene: Shuggie Bain. Translated by Jerca Kos. Ljubljana: Mladinska knjiga. 19 November 2022. ISBN 978-961-01-6782-2.
- Spanish: Historia de Shuggie Bain. Translated by Francisco González López. Ciudad de México / Madrid: Editoruial Sexo Piso S.A. de C.V. 2021. ISBN 978-84-18342-36-3.
- Hungarian: Shuggie Bain. Translated by Endre Greskovits. Budapest: Park Könyvkiadó. 12 November 2021. ISBN 978-963-355-757-0.

== Reception ==
Writing in The Observer, Alex Preston said: "Rarely does a debut novel establish its world with such sure-footedness, and Stuart's prose is lithe, lyrical and full of revelatory descriptive insights. This is a memorable book about family, violence and sexuality." Reviewing for The New York Times, Leah Hager Cohen wrote that "the book would be just about unbearable were it not for the author's astonishing capacity for love. He's lovely, Douglas Stuart, fierce and loving and lovely. He shows us lots of monstrous behavior, but not a single monster — only damage. If he has a sharp eye for brokenness, he is even keener on the inextinguishable flicker of love that remains."

In the Daily Telegraph, Cal Revely-Calder called the novel "an astonishing portrait, drawn from life, of a society left to die – forgotten by those who didn't believe in society, and told it to care for itself." Allan Massie in The Scotsman noted that Stuart "hides nothing of the horrors of galloping alcoholism, but there is a gallantry about Agnes which commands respect and admiration, however reluctantly." Michael Delgado of Literary Review described the relationship between Agnes and Shuggie as having "an overwhelming intensity of feeling," perhaps because it is so heavily drawn from Stuart's life: "Reading the details of it is like taking repeated abdominal punches, one for each time Agnes hauls herself onto the wagon and tumbles back off again."

The starred review in Kirkus Reviews concluded: "How can love be so powerful and so helpless at the same time? Readers may get through the whole novel without breaking down—then read the first sentence of the acknowledgements and lose it. The emotional truth embodied here will crack you open. You will never forget Shuggie Bain. Scene by scene, this book is a masterpiece." Comparing the book to another of the year's Booker Prize shortlisted works, Real Life by Brandon Taylor, Shougat Dasgupta noted in The Hindu that both novels were "bound by a sense of dread and a groping towards love", and went on to describe Shuggie Bain as part of a "rich seam of contemporary Scottish working class writing." Summarising, the review stated: "Occasionally, Shuggie Bain, with its sentimentality and overwhelming squalor, can veer close to self-parody but is always pulled back from the brink by its enormous heart, by the enormous love that binds Shuggie to Agnes."

Shuggie Bain was longlisted for the 2021 Andrew Carnegie Medal for Excellence in Fiction, shortlisted for the 2020 Center for Fiction First Novel Prize, and was a finalist for the 2020 Kirkus Prize as well as the 2020 National Book Award for Fiction. On 19 November 2020, it was announced as the winner of the 2020 Booker Prize, chosen by a judging panel comprising Margaret Busby (chair), Lee Child, Sameer Rahim, Lemn Sissay, and Emily Wilson. Interviewed at the time of his Booker longlisting, Stuart said that the previous Scottish winner of the prize, James Kelman's How Late It Was, How Late (1994), changed his life and was "one of the first times I saw my people, my dialect, on the page".

The novel headed The Telegraph's list of "The 50 best books of 2020" and was picked by The Times as the year's best novel, in addition to being named as one of the best books of the year by many other publications and outlets, including The New York Times, The Washington Post, Time, BBC, The Guardian, The Observer, Financial Times, Kirkus Reviews, Vogue, and Elle.

In 2021, a mural inspired by the novel was unveiled on the wall of the Barrowland Ballroom in Glasgow, featuring Shuggie Bain dancing in the street, together with a quote from his mother Agnes: "You'll not remember the city, you were too wee, but there's dancing. All kinds of dancing." The artwork and lettering was created by the Cobolt Collective – comprising Glasgow School of Art 2015 graduates Erin Bradley-Scott, Chelsea Frew, and Kat Loudon – and is 20 meters high and 20 meters wide. In his response, Douglas Stuart said: "I hope the mural inspires other weans to dream big with their creativity. It's definitely one of the proudest moments of my life."

Shuggie Bain was included on the "Big Jubilee Read" list of 70 books selected by the BBC and The Reading Agency to celebrate the Platinum Jubilee of Queen Elizabeth II in June 2022.

== Television adaptation ==
In December 2020, it was announced that A24 and Scott Rudin Productions had won the rights for a television adaptation of Shuggie Bain, with Scott Rudin and Eli Bush as producers and Stuart set to adapt the novel. In November 2022, BBC confirmed the adaptation, which will be filmed in Scotland and broadcast on BBC One and iPlayer. Stuart will adapt Shuggie Bain himself. A24 will co-produce and hold international distribution rights.

== Awards and nominations ==
Year	Award	Result	Ref.
2020	Booker Prize	Won	
2020	Books Are My Bag Readers' Awards: Breakthrough Author Award	Shortlisted	
2020	Center for Fiction First Novel Prize	Shortlisted	
2020	Kirkus Prize for Fiction	Finalist	
2020	Los Angeles Times Book Prize: Art Seidenbaum Award for First Fiction	Finalist	
2020	National Book Award for Fiction	Finalist	
2020	National Book Critics Circle Award: John Leonard Prize	Finalist	
2020	Waterstones Scottish Book of the Year	Won	
2021	American Academy of Arts and Letters: Sue Kaufman Prize for First Fiction	Won	
2021	Andrew Carnegie Medal for Excellence in Fiction	Longlisted	
2021	British Book Awards: Overall Book of the Year	Won	
2021	British Book Awards: Debut Book of the Year	Won	
2021	Dayton Literary Peace Prize: Fiction	Finalist	
2021	Independent Publisher Book Awards: Europe Best Regional Fiction (Bronze)	Won	
2021	Indie Book Awards UK: Fiction	Shortlisted	
2021	Lambda Literary Award for Gay Fiction	Finalist	
2021	Orwell Prize for Political Fiction	Longlisted	
2021	PEN/Hemingway Award for Debut Novel	Finalist	
2021	Polari Prize: Polari First Book Prize	Shortlisted	
2021	Prix du roman Fnac: French translation by Charles Bonnot	Nominated	
2021	Rathbones Folio Prize	Longlisted	
