= Maaza Mengiste =

Ethiopian-American writer (born 1974)

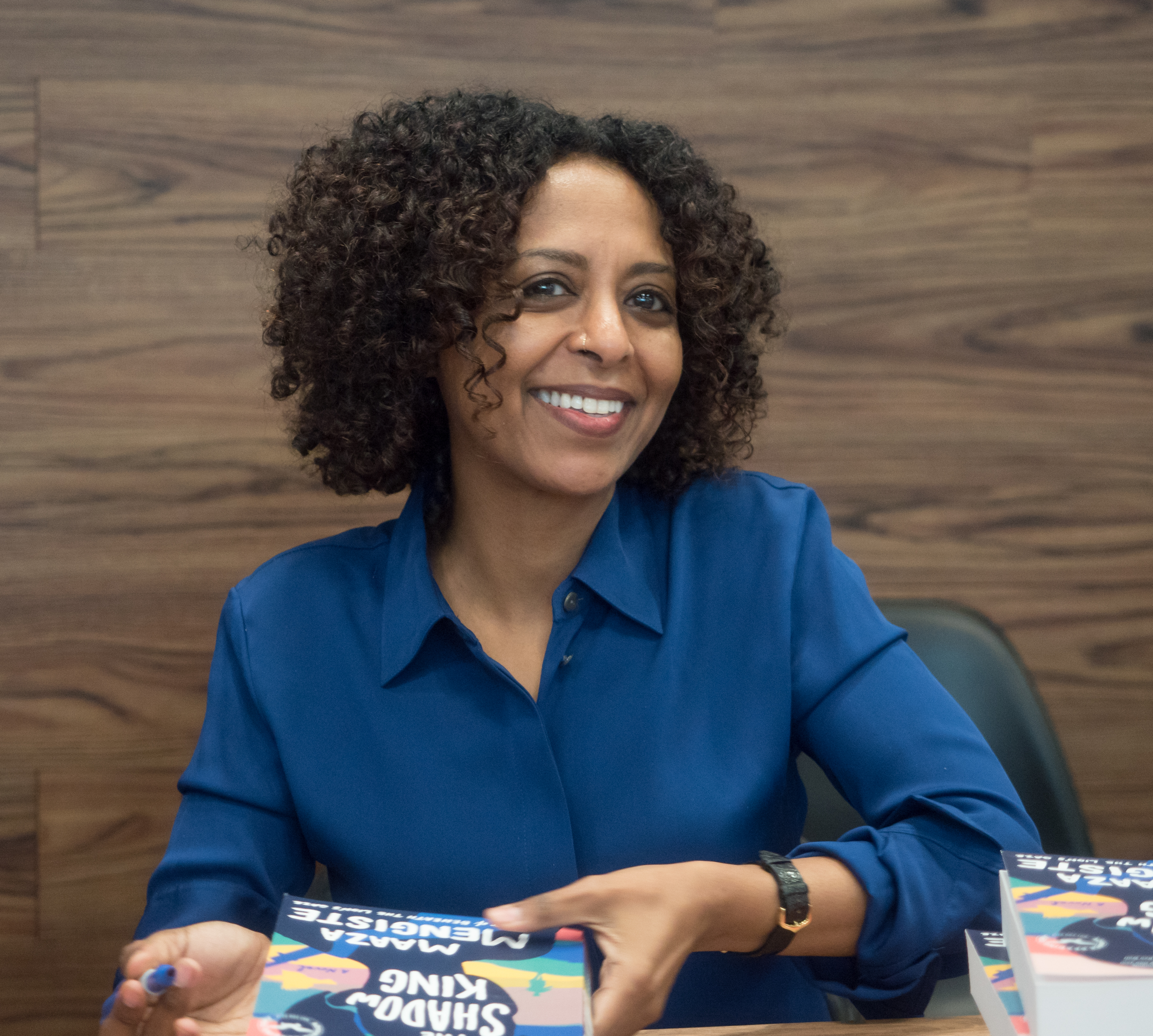
- Mengiste, BookExpo 2019
- Born: 1974 (age 51–52); Addis Ababa, Ethiopia
- Education: University of Michigan (BA) New York University (MFA)
- Occupations: Novelist; professor
- Writing career
- Genres: Fiction; non-fiction
- Notable works: Beneath the Lion's Gaze (2010); The Shadow King (2019)
- Website: maazamengiste.com

Maaza Mengiste (born 1974) is an Ethiopian-American writer. She published two novels, Beneath the Lion's Gaze (2010) and The Shadow King (2019), which was shortlisted for the 2020 Booker Prize. She received a MacArthur Fellowship in 2026.

== Early life ==
Mengiste was born in Addis Ababa, Ethiopia, but left the country at the age of four when her family fled the Ethiopian Revolution. She spent the rest of her childhood in Nigeria, Kenya, and the United States. She earned a Bachelor of Arts degree in English from the University of Michigan, later studied in Italy as a Fulbright Scholar, and earned an MFA degree in creative writing from New York University.

== Career ==
Mengiste has published fiction and nonfiction dealing with migration, the Ethiopian revolution, and the plight of sub-Saharan immigrants arriving in Europe. Her work has appeared in The New York Times, The New Yorker, Granta, Lettre Internationale, Enkare Review, Callaloo, The Granta Anthology of the African Short Story (edited by Helon Habila), New Daughters of Africa (edited by Margaret Busby), and has been broadcast on BBC Radio 4.

Mengiste's 2010 debut novel Beneath the Lion's Gaze – the story of a family struggling to survive the tumultuous and bloody years of the Ethiopian Revolution – was named one of the 10 best contemporary African books by The Guardian and has been translated into French, Spanish, Portuguese, German, Italian, Dutch, and Swedish. She was runner-up for the 2011 Dayton Literary Peace Prize, and a finalist for a Flaherty-Dunnan First Novel Prize, an NAACP Image Award, and an Indies Choice Book of the Year Award in Adult Debut. In 2013 she was World Literature Today’s Puterbaugh Fellow. She counts among her influences E. L. Doctorow, Toni Morrison, James Baldwin, and Edith Wharton.

Mengiste's second novel, The Shadow King (2019), is set during Mussolini's 1935 invasion of Ethiopia, and shines a light on the women soldiers not usually credited in African history. Alex Clark in The Guardian said of it: "It is both a reasonably conventional narrative – there is plenty of action, detailed description and a focus spread between the principal characters – and a subtly unpredictable one. History and modernity are juxtaposed in the factual asymmetries of warfare (the Ethiopians must rely on outdated and often malfunctioning weapons and have no way of long-distance communication beyond running messengers). They are also set side by side in the modes of consciousness that all the characters experience." Michael Schaub of NPR wrote: "The importance of memory — of those that came before us, and of things we'd rather forget — is at the heart of The Shadow King.... The star of the novel, however, is Mengiste's gorgeous writing, which makes The Shadow King nearly impossible to put down. Mengiste has a real gift for language; her writing is powerful but never florid, gripping the reader and refusing to let go. And this, combined with her excellent sense of pacing, makes the book one of the most beautiful novels of the year. It's a brave, stunning call for the world to remember all who we've lost to senseless violence."

Mengiste has also been involved in human rights work. She serves on the advisory board of Warscapes, an independent online magazine that highlights current conflicts across the world, and is affiliated with the Young Center for Immigrant Children's Rights. Mengiste also serves on the Board of Directors for Words Without Borders.

Alongside Edwidge Danticat and Mona Eltahawy, Mengiste contributed a section to Richard E. Robbins's 2013 documentary film Girl Rising on girls' education around the world for 10x10 Films, with narration by Meryl Streep, Anne Hathaway, Alicia Keys, and Cate Blanchett.

Mengiste is currently a Professor of English at Wesleyan University. Previously, she taught in the MFA Program in Creative Writing at Queens College, City University of New York, and in the Creative Writing program at the Lewis Center for the Arts at Princeton University.

From January to June 2020, Mengiste was "writer in residence" of the Literaturhaus Zurich and the PWG Foundation in Zurich.

Her novel The Shadow King (2019) was shortlisted for the 2020 Booker Prize.

In January 2021, Otosirieze Obi-Young profiled her for Open Country Magazine in the cover article of that quarter's edition of the magazine. The piece was titled "Maaza Mengiste is Reframing Ethiopian History".

== Awards, honours, and nominations ==
- Fulbright Fellowship, Italy, 2010–2011
- Flaherty-Dunnan First Novel Prize, Shortlist, 2010
- Beneath the Lion's Gaze named one of The Best Books of 2010, Fiction. Christian Science Monitor, 2010
- Dayton Literary Peace Prize, Fiction Runner-up, 2011
- Beneath the Lion's Gaze named one of "The 10 Best Contemporary African Books". The Guardian, 2012
- Puterbaugh Fellow, 2013
- National Endowment for the Arts, Literature Fellowship, 2018 - Prose
- Creative Capital Award, Literary Fiction, 2019
- The Bridge Book Award - American Academy in Rome, US Embassy to Italy, Casa delle Letterature di Roma, Federazione Unitaria Italiana Scrittori, Center for Fiction - Rome, 2019
- Literaturhaus - Writers in Residence, 2020
- American Academy of Arts and Letters, Literature Award Winner, 2020
- Booker Prize Shortlist, 2020
- Edgar Awards Short Story Prize, Winner, 2021
- Premio Gregor von Rezzori, Winner, 2021
- New York Public Library Cullman Fellow, 2021–2022
- Guggenheim fellowship, 2022
- Intercultura Città di Ravenna Prize, along with Kader Abdolah, 2024
- Premio Internazionale Bottari Lattes Grinzane, Winner, 2025
- American Academy in Berlin, Berlin Prize Fellowship, 2026
- MacArthur Fellowship 2026 (so-called "Genius award")

== Works ==
=== Books ===
- Beneath the Lion's Gaze. W. W. Norton. 2010
- The Shadow King. W. W. Norton (US). 2019
- Addis Ababa Noir. Akashic Books. 2020
- Of Interest to the General Public. diaphanes. 2026

=== Essays ===
- "Vanishing Virgil". Granta. 15 November 2011
- "A New 'Tizita'". Callaloo. 2011
- "The Madonna of the Sea". Granta. 30 January 2012
- "Creative Writing as Translation". Callaloo. 2012
- "The Conflicted Legacy of Meles Zenawi". Granta. 2012
- "What Makes a Real African?". The Guardian. 7 July 2013
- "We must not look away from the crises in Africa". The Guardian. 31 July 2014
- "From a Shrinking Place". The New Inquiry. 25 November 2014
- "Sudden Flowers". The New Yorker. 4 February 2015
- "Fiction Tells a Truth That History Cannot". Guernica. 2 November 2015
- "Unheard-of Things". The Massachusetts Review (57:1). 2016
- "Primo Levi at the United Nations: Maaza Mengiste". Primo Levi Center, Printed_Matter. 6 May 2016
- "Bending History". Nka: Journal of Contemporary African Art (38–39). November 2016
- "How 'S-Town' Fails Black Listeners". Rolling Stone. (13 April) 2017
- "I Want My Work to Exist in the Memories of People". Anxy Magazine (3). 2018
- "Foreword". In Vintage Addis Ababa, Ayaana Publishing. 2018
- "This is What the Journey Does". The Displaced: Refugee Writers on Refugee Living, Abrams Books, 2018
- "In Ethiopia's Highlands, a Search for Hope and Horror". Wall Street Journal, 20 August 2019
- "Writing About the Forgotten Black Women of the Italo-Ethiopian War". Literary Hub. 24 September 2019
- "From Homer to Alexievich: Top 10 books about the human cost of war". The Guardian. 29 January 2020
