= Man v. Nature =

2014 short story collection by Diane Cook

- Author: Diane Cook
- Genre: Climate fiction
- Publisher: HarperCollins
- Publication date: October 7, 2014
- Pages: 256
- ISBN: 978-0-06-233310-0

Man v. Nature: Stories is a 2014 short story collection by American writer Diane Cook. It is a work of post apocalyptic climate fiction.

It received positive reviews from critics at the time of its publication. Catherine Lacey of Electric Literature wrote, "I haven’t read anything that tackles the anxiety of oblivion better Diane Cook’s Man V. Nature." Justine Jordan of The Guardian called it "playfully devastating".

Man v. Nature was shortlisted for the 2015 Guardian First Book Award, and the PEN/Hemingway Award for Debut Novel. It was a finalist for the Art Seidenbaum Award for First Fiction.
