= Goromonzi District =

Coordinates: 17°45′S 31°20′E

Goromonzi District is a district of Mashonaland East Province, Zimbabwe, in Southern Africa. It is located in the eastern part of Zimbabwe, and covers an area of approximately 9,100 square kilometres (3,500 sq mi). As of the 2022 census, it had a population of 386,203, up from 154,262 in the 2002 census. The people who live in the region are principally from the Shona tribe.

== Politics ==
Goromonzi lies in Mashonaland East, and is represented in the national Parliament by the single seat of Goromonzi in the Senate and by three seats (Goromonzi North, Goromonzi South, and Goromonzi West) in the House of Assembly.

== Economy ==
Until 1999, the economy of the area was flourishing and many of the local residents of Goromonzi were employed, and had jobs on commercial farms that were growing flowers and gourmet vegetables in greenhouses for export to Europe. These commercial farms are no longer operational due to the Zimbabwean government's land reform programme which evicted and drove white born Zimbabweans out of their homes and off commercial farms. Local unemployment is now standing at 80% or more. Traditional families now base their livelihoods on subsistence farming methods, growing corn, pumpkins and other crops that are dependent on rainfall. At the current rate of inflation, the cost of fertilizers and seeds are prohibitive for them, and there is limited access to the market today.

== Food ==
Food is the most critical concern of the people of Goromonzi. Unemployment, lack of transportation, the fact that there are few adults between the ages of 25 and 60, and a lack of farming knowledge passed from parents to children have all contributed to the difficulty in obtaining and producing food. Many children and adults are malnourished due to the scarcity of food in the region. Most have only one meal per day. Much needs to be done to ensure food security in the area.

== Medicine ==
Three medical clinics are available for the community. Resources are strained to serve such a wide area; and some people have to walk 19 kilometres (12 mi) or more to get care. Although malaria is not a serious problem due to Goromonzi’s altitude, schistosomiasis (bilharzia) is widespread and goes untreated, along with a multitude of parasitic infections and other easily treated illnesses.

Water is obtained by digging wells, although the influence of development is seeping into the community, thus providing tapped water to a rapidly expanding community. New houses are springing up as a township is now being built to cater for middle-class citizens who have tired of the city life. There are two types of well; hand drawn and electrically operated. When a well fails, there are not always the financial resources to dig a new one. Electric pumps are subject to lightning strikes and mechanical problems. Goromonzi is on the electric grid, but individual homes are not connected, and it is too expensive for most families.

== Transportation ==
The roads in Goromonzi are dirt or strip roads (strip roads are dirt roads with a narrow strip of tar for each wheel) and are in poor condition. There is little traffic, as few people have the resources to own or operate a truck. Public transport is by commuter taxi. There are a few oxcarts. Walking is the standard, and it is not unusual for children to walk 3 or 6 kilometres (4 mi) to school, or for hungry family members to walk the same distance for food.

== Education ==
There are ten schools in the Goromonzi area: five primary and five secondary schools that serve 6729 students, ages 5 to 22. There are 50 or more students in each class with one teacher. Textbooks, workbooks and other learning materials are noticeably absent. The school libraries are sparse. The cost of school fees, uniforms and textbooks are unreachable for many families, so it is unusual for a child to attend school without interruption or to complete all of their schooling. Sporting activities include soccer, netball, javelin and rugby, among others.
