= The Shadow King (novel) =

2019 novel by Maaza Mengiste

- First edition cover
- Author: Maaza Mengiste
- Language: English
- Genre: Historical novel
- Set in: Ethiopia
- Publisher: W. W. Norton & Company
- Publication date: September 24, 2019
- Publication place: United States
- Pages: 448
- ISBN: 978-0-393-08356-9
- OCLC: 1084322904
- Dewey Decimal: 813/.6
- LC Class: PS3613.E488 S53 2019
- Preceded by: Beneath the Lion's Gaze (2010)
- Followed by: Addis Ababa Noir (2020)

The Shadow King is a 2019 novel by Ethiopian-American writer Maaza Mengiste, published by W. W. Norton & Company on September 24, 2019. It was shortlisted for the 2020 Booker Prize.

The novel focuses on the Second Italo-Ethiopian War which resulted in the Ethiopians putting an end to Italian occupation.

== Reception ==
Namwali Serpell, writing for The New York Times, described the novel as 'lyrical' and 'remarkable'.

Alex Clark, in The Guardian, described the novel as 'absorbing' and said that Mengiste's achievement was to "bring to life those women, and to depict them as dynamic entities".

== Film adaptation ==
In April 2020, it was announced that Kasi Lemmons would direct a film adaptation of The Shadow King for Atlas Entertainment.
