= Tsitsi Dangarembga =

Zimbabwean author and filmmaker

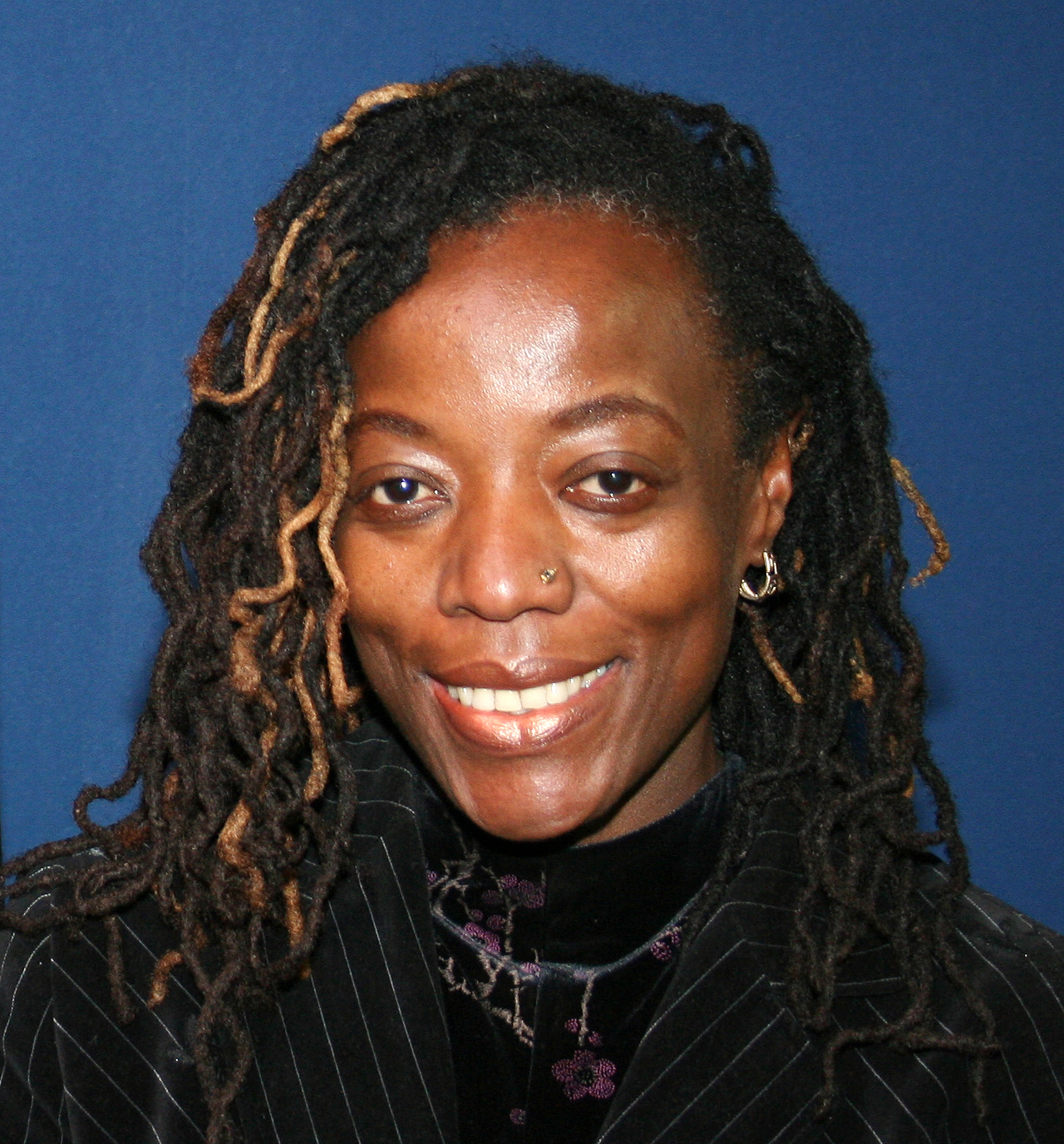
- Dangarembga in November 2006
- Born: 4 February 1959 (age 67); Mutoko, Southern Rhodesia
- Education: Sidney Sussex College, Cambridge; University of Zimbabwe; German Film and Television Academy Berlin; Humboldt University of Berlin
- Occupations: Writer and filmmaker
- Spouse: Olaf Koschke
- Children: Tonderai, Chadamoyo and Masimba
- Writing career
- Notable works: Nervous Conditions (1988); The Book of Not (2006); This Mournable Body (2018)
- Notable awards: Commonwealth Writers' Prize, Africa section, 1989; PEN International Award for Freedom of Expression, 2021; Windham-Campbell Literature Prize, 2022

Tsitsi Dangarembga (born 4 February 1959) is a Zimbabwean novelist, playwright and filmmaker. Her debut novel, Nervous Conditions (1988), which was the first to be published in English by a Black woman from Zimbabwe, was named by the BBC in 2018 as one of the top 100 books that have shaped the world. She has won other literary honours, including the Commonwealth Writers' Prize and the PEN Pinter Prize. In 2020, her novel This Mournable Body was shortlisted for the Booker Prize. In 2022, Dangarembga was convicted in a Zimbabwe court of inciting public violence, by displaying, on a public road, a placard asking for reform; her conviction was later overturned.

== Early life and education ==
Tsitsi Dangarembga was born on 4 February 1959 in Mutoko, Southern Rhodesia (now Zimbabwe), a small town where her parents taught at the nearby mission school. Her mother, Susan Dangarembga, was the first black woman in Southern Rhodesia to obtain a bachelor's degree, and her father, Amon, would later become a school headmaster. From the ages of two to six, Dangarembga lived in England, while her parents pursued higher education. There, as she has recalled, she and her brother began to speak English "as a matter of course and forgot most of the Shona we had learnt." She returned to Rhodesia with her family in 1965, the year of the colony's Unilateral Declaration of Independence. In Rhodesia, she reacquired Shona, but considered English, the language of her schooling, her first language.

In 1965, she moved with her family to Old Mutare, a Methodist mission near Umtali (now Mutare) where her father and mother took up respective positions as headmaster and teacher at Hartzell High School. Dangarembga, who had begun her education in England, enrolled at Hartzell Primary School, before going to board at the Marymount Mission convent school. She completed her A-Levels at Arundel School, an elite, predominantly white girls' school in the capital, Salisbury (today Harare), and in 1977 went to the University of Cambridge to study medicine at Sidney Sussex College. There, she experienced racism and isolation and left after three years, returning in 1980 to Zimbabwe several months before the country's independence.

Dangarembga worked briefly as a teacher, before taking up studies in medicine and psychology at the University of Zimbabwe while working for two years as a copywriter at a marketing agency. She joined the university drama club, and wrote and directed several of the plays the group performed. She also became involved with the theatre group Zambuko, during which she participated in the production of two plays, Katshaa! and Mavambo. She later recalled, "There were simply no plays with roles for black women, or at least we didn't have access to them at the time. The writers in Zimbabwe were basically men at the time. And so I really didn't see that the situation would be remedied unless some women sat down and wrote something, so that's what I did!" She wrote three plays during this period: Lost of the Soil (1983), She No Longer Weeps, and The Third One. During these years, she also began reading works by African-American women writers and contemporary African literature, a shift from the English classics she had grown up reading.

== Career ==
=== 1980s and 1990s ===
In 1985, Dangarembga's short story "The Letter" won second place in a writing competition arranged by the Swedish International Development Cooperation Agency, and was published in Sweden in the anthology Whispering Land. In 1987, her play She No Longer Weeps, which she wrote during her university years, was published in Harare. Her first novel, Nervous Conditions, was published in 1988 in the United Kingdom, and a year later in the United States. She wrote it in 1985, but experienced difficulties getting it published; rejected by four Zimbabwean publishers, she eventually found a willing publisher in the London-based Women's Press. Nervous Conditions, the first novel written in English by a black woman from Zimbabwe, received domestic and international acclaim, and was awarded the Commonwealth Writers' Prize (Africa region) in 1989. Her work is included in the 1992 anthology Daughters of Africa, edited by Margaret Busby. Nervous Conditions is considered one of the best African novels ever written, and was included on the BBC's 2018 list of top 100 books that have shaped the world.

In 1989, Dangarembga went to Germany to study film direction at the German Film and Television Academy Berlin. She produced a number of films while in Berlin, including a documentary aired on German television. In 1992, she founded Nyerai Films, a production company based in Harare. She wrote the story for the film Neria, made in 1991, which became the highest-grossing film in Zimbabwean history. Her 1996 film Everyone's Child, the first feature film directed by a black Zimbabwean woman, was shown internationally, including at the Dublin International Film Festival. The film, shot on location in Harare and Domboshava, follows the tragic stories of four siblings after their parents die of AIDS.

=== 2000 onwards ===
In 2000, Dangarembga moved back to Zimbabwe with her family, and continued her work with Nyerai Films. In 2002, she founded the International Images Film Festival. Her 2005 film Kare Kare Zvako won the Short Film Award and Golden Dhow at the Zanzibar International Film Festival, and the African Short Film Award at the Milan Film Festival. Her 2006 film Peretera Maneta received the UNESCO Children's and Human Rights Award and won the Zanzibar International Film Festival. She is the executive director of the organization Women Filmmakers of Zimbabwe and the founding director of the International Images Film Festival for Women of Harare (IIFF). As of 2010, she has also served on the board of the Zimbabwe College of Music for five years, including two years as chair. She is a founding member of the Institute for Creative Arts for Progress for Creative Arts in Africa (ICAPA).

Asked about her lack of writing since Nervous Conditions, Dangarembga explained in 2004: "firstly, the novel was published only after I had turned to film as a medium; secondly, Virginia Woolf's shrewd observation that a woman needs £500 and a room of her own in order to write is entirely valid. Incidentally, I am moving and hope that, for the first time since Nervous Conditions, I shall have a room of my own. I'll try to ignore the bit about £500." Indeed, two years later in 2006, she published her second novel, The Book of Not, a sequel to Nervous Conditions. She also became involved in politics, and in 2010 was named education secretary of the Movement for Democratic Change political party led by Arthur Mutambara. She cited her background coming from a family of educators, her brief stint as a teacher, and her "practical, if not formal," involvement in the education sector as preparing her for the role. She completed doctoral studies in African studies at Humboldt University of Berlin, and wrote her PhD thesis on the reception of African film.

She was a judge for the 2014 Etisalat Prize for Literature. In 2016, she was selected by the Rockefeller Foundation Bellagio Center for their Artists in Residency program. Her third novel, This Mournable Body, a sequel to The Book of Not and Nervous Conditions, was published in 2018 by Graywolf Press in the US, and in the UK by Faber and Faber in 2020, described by Alexandra Fuller in The New York Times as "another masterpiece" and by Novuyo Rosa Tshuma in The Guardian as "magnificent ... another classic". This Mournable Body was one of the six novels shortlisted for the 2020 Booker Prize, chosen from 162 submissions.

In an interview with Bhakti Shringarpure for Bomb magazine, Dangaremgba discussed the rationale behind her novels: "My first publisher, the late Ros de Lanerolle, asked me to write a sequel to Nervous Conditions. Writing the sequel, I realized the second book would deal only with the middle part of the protagonist's life. ... [and] offered no answers to the questions raised in Nervous Conditions concerning how life with any degree of agency is possible for such people. ... I was captivated by the idea of writing a trilogy about a very ordinary person who starts off as an impoverished rural girl in colonial Rhodesia and has to try to build a meaningful life for herself. The form has also allowed me to engage with some aspects of Zimbabwe's national development from a personal rather than a political angle."

In 2019, Dangarembga was announced as a finalist for the St. Francis College Literary Prize, a biennial award recognizing outstanding fiction by writers in the middle stages of their careers, which was eventually won that year by Samantha Hunt.

On 31 July 2020 Dangarembga was arrested in Harare, Zimbabwe, ahead of anti-corruption protests. Later that year she was on the list of the BBC's 100 Women announced on 23 November 2020.

In September 2020, Dangarembga was announced as the University of East Anglia's inaugural International Chair of Creative Writing, from 2021 to 2022.

Dangarembga won the 2021 PEN International Award for Freedom of Expression, given annually since 2005 to honour writers who continue working despite being persecuted for their writing.

In June 2021, it was announced that Dangarembga would be the recipient of the prestigious 2021 Peace Prize awarded by the German book publishers and booksellers association, making her the first black woman to be honoured with the award since it was inaugurated in 1950.

In July 2021, she was elected to honorary Fellowship of Sidney Sussex College, Cambridge.

Dangarembga was chosen by English PEN as winner of the 2021 PEN Pinter Prize, awarded annually to a writer who, in the words spoken by Harold Pinter on receiving his Nobel Prize for Literature, casts an "unflinching, unswerving" gaze upon the world and shows a "fierce intellectual determination... to define the real truth of our lives and our societies". In her acceptance speech at the British Library on 11 October 2021, Dangarembga named the Ugandan novelist Kakwenza Rukirabashaija as the International Writer of Courage Award.

In 2022, Dangarembga was selected to receive a Windham-Campbell Literature Prize for fiction.

In June 2022, an arrest warrant was issued against Tsitsi Dangarembga. She was prosecuted for incitement to public violence and violation of anti-Covid rules after an anti-government demonstration organized at the end of July 2020.

On 28 September 2022, Dangarembga was officially convicted of promoting public violence after she and her friend, Julie Barnes, walked around Harare in a peaceful protest while holding placards that read “We Want Better. Reform Our Institutions”. Dangarembga was given a $110 fine and a suspended six-month jail sentence. She announced that she planned to appeal her verdict amid human rights groups claiming that her prosecution was a direct result of President Emmerson Mnangagwa’s attempts to “silence opposition in the long-troubled southern African country”. On 8 May 2023, it was announced that Dangarembga's conviction had been overturned after she appealed the initial conviction in 2022.

== Selected awards and honours ==
- 1989: Commonwealth Writers' Prize (Africa region) for Nervous Conditions;
- 2005: Kare Kare Zvako wis the Short Film Award and Golden Dhow at the Zanzibar International Film Festival, and the African Short Film Award at the Milan Film Festival;
- 2018: Nervous Conditions named by the BBC as one of the top 100 books that have shaped the world;
- 2020: This Mournable Body shortlisted for the Booker Prize;
- 2021: PEN International Award for Freedom of Expression;
- 2021: 2021 Peace Prize from the German book publishers and booksellers association;
- 2021: Honorary Fellowship of Sidney Sussex College, Cambridge;
- 2021: PEN Pinter Prize from English PEN;
- 2022: Windham-Campbell Literature Prize (fiction);
- 2022: Royal Society of Literature International Writer.

== List of works ==
=== Written works ===
- The Third One (play)
- Lost of the Soil (play), 1983
- The Letter (short story), 1985, published in Whispering Land
- She No Longer Weeps (play), 1987
- Nervous Conditions (novel), 1988, ISBN 9781919772288
- The Book of Not (novel), 2006, ISBN 9780954702373
- This Mournable Body (novel), 2018, ISBN 9781555978129
- Black and Female (essays), 2022, ISBN 9780571373192

=== Filmography ===
- Neria (1993) (story writing)
- The Great Beauty Conspiracy (1994)
- Passport to Kill (1994)
- Schwarzmarkt (1995)
- Everyone's Child (1996)
- The Puppeteer (1996)
- Zimbabwe Birds, with Olaf Koschke (1988)
- On the Border (2000)
- Hard Earth – Land Rights in Zimbabwe (2001)
- Ivory (2001)
- Elephant People (2002)
- Mother’s Day (2004)
- High Hopes (2004)
- At the Water (2005)
- Growing Stronger (2005)
- Kare Kare Zvako (2005)
- Peretera Maneta (2006)
- The Sharing Day (2008)
- I Want a Wedding Dress (2010)
- Ungochani (2010)
- Nyami Nyami Amaji Abulozi (2011)
