= 2020 in literature =

This article contains information about the literary events and publications of 2020.

== Events ==
- April 14 – Bookshops are among the first few premises permitted to reopen on relaxation of restrictions arising from the COVID-19 pandemic in Italy.
- May 26–July 10 – J. K. Rowling releases her new fairy tale The Ickabog in free online instalments during restrictions arising from the COVID-19 pandemic in the United Kingdom.
- June 25 – Louisa May Alcott's unfinished "Aunt Nellie's Story" (c.1849) is first published, in The Strand Magazine.
- July 31 – 2020 Booker Prize longlisted (later shortlisted) author Tsitsi Dangarembga is arrested in Zimbabwe as part of a government crackdown ahead of anti-corruption protests.
- August – The Herzog August Library in Wolfenbüttel, Germany, purchases Das Große Stammbuch, an album amicorum compiled by diplomat Philipp Hainhofer, which the library's patron Augustus the Younger, Duke of Brunswick-Lüneburg, tried but failed to acquire following Hainhofer's death in 1647.
- October 13 – A first issue first edition of Harry Potter and the Philosopher's Stone sells at auction in the UK for £60,000 and a copy of Isaac Newton's The Mathematical Principles of Natural Philosophy in the 1729 English translation (the second to sell in recent weeks) for £24,000.
- October 14 – A Shakespeare First Folio sells at auction in New York City for $9.98M (£7.6M) (50% more than the previous copy auctioned in 2001).
- November 25 – Penguin Random House agrees to acquire rival publisher Simon & Schuster from ViacomCBS for US$2.175 billion.

== New books ==
Dates after each title indicate the first publication, unless otherwise indicated.

ISBN in first citation always refers to the first edition published. Links should point to first edition, though they may point to newer editions by the same publisher. If the publisher does not present the first edition online, a second citation is provided with a link to a newer one on the publisher's site.

OCLC may represent other ISBNs in some cases.

=== Fiction ===
Author	Work	Date	Nation	Publisher	Reviews	Awards
Gil Adamson	Ridgerunner	May 12	(Canada)	House of Anansi		
Becky Albertalli	Love, Creekwood	Jun 30	(United States)	HarperCollins		
Deepa Anappara	Djinn Patrol on the Purple Line	Jan 30	(United Kingdom)	Random House		
Lutz van Dijk	Kampala – Hamburg: Roman einer Flucht	Mar 1	(Germany)	Quer-Verlag		
Marianne Apostolides	I Can't Get You Out of My Mind	Apr 7	(Canada)			
John Banville	Snow	Sep 29	(United Kingdom)			
Deni Ellis Béchard	A Song from Faraway	Apr 7	(Canada)			
Brit Bennett	The Vanishing Half	Jun 2	(United States)	Riverhead Books		
David Bergen	Here the Dark	Mar 10	(Canada)			
Chetan Bhagat	One Arranged Murder	Sep 28	(India)			
Christopher Bollen	A Beautiful Crime	Jan 28	(United States)	Harper		
Taylor Brown	Pride of Eden	Jul 13	(United States)	Picador		
Amina Cain	Indelicacy	Feb 11	(United States)	Farrar, Straus and Giroux		
Maisy Card	These Ghosts Are Family	Jul 28	(United States)	Simon & Schuster		
Marjorie Celona	How a Woman Becomes a Lake	Mar 3	(Canada)			
Annette Saunooke Clapsaddle	Even As We Breathe	Nov 18	(United States)			
Susanna Clarke	Piranesi	Sep 15	(United Kingdom)	Bloomsbury		
Steven Conte	The Tolstoy Estate	Sep 2	(Australia)			
Diane Cook	The New Wilderness	Aug 11	(United States)	Harper		
S.A Cosby	Blacktop Wasteland	Jul 14	(United States)	Flatiron Books		
Eva Crocker	All I Ask	Jun 2	(Canada)			
Amy McDaid	Fake Baby	Jun 2	(New Zealand)	Penguin Books New Zealand		
Raphaël Enthoven	Le Temps gagné (Time Saved)	Aug 19	(France)			
Louise Erdrich	The Night Watchman	Mar 3	(United States)	HarperCollins		
William Gibson	Agency	Jan 21	(Canada)			
Georgi Gospodinov	Времеубежище (Time Shelter)		(Bulgaria)			
John Gould	The End of Me	May 2	(Canada)			
Alix E. Harrow	The Once and Future Witches	Oct 13	(United States)	Redhook Books		
Aislinn Hunter	The Certainties	May 19	(Canada)			
Clifford Jackman	The Braver Thing	May 12	(Canada)	Random House Canada		
Tomasz Jędrowski	Swimming in the Dark	Feb 6	(United Kingdom)	Bloomsbury		
Meng Jin	Little Gods	Jan 14	(United States)	Custom House		
Stephen Graham Jones	The Only Good Indians	Jul 14	(United States)	Saga Press		
David Joy	When These Mountains Burn	Aug 18	(United States)	Putnam Press		
Sue Monk Kidd	The Book of Longings	Apr 21	(United States)	Penguin Group		
Thomas King	Obsidian	Jan 28	(Canada)			
Karl Ove Knausgård	Morgenstjernen	Sep 18	(Denmark)			
Hervé Le Tellier	L'anomalie (The Anomaly)	Aug 20	(France)			
Raven Leilani	Luster	Aug 4	(United States)	Farrar, Straus and Giroux		
Kathy Lette	HRT: Husband Replacement Therapy	Apr 28	(Australia)			
Juliana Delgado Lopera	Fiebre Tropical	Mar 3	(United States)	Feminist Press		
Pasha Malla	Kill the Mall	May 12	(Canada)			
Emily St. John Mandel	The Glass Hotel	Mar 24	(Canada)	HarperCollins; Knopf		
Hilary Mantel	The Mirror and the Light	Mar 5	(United Kingdom)	Fourth Estate		
Laura Jean McKay	The Animals in That Country	Nov 10	(Australia)	Scribe Australia		
Shani Mootoo	Polar Vortex	Mar 3	(Canada)			
Silvia Moreno-Garcia	Mexican Gothic	Jun 30	(Canada)	Del Rey		
Maria Mutch	Molly Falls to Earth	Apr 28	(Canada)			
Maggie O'Farrell	Hamnet	Mar 31	(United Kingdom)	Tinder Press		
Katrina Onstad	Stay Where I Can See You	Mar 31	(Canada)			
Ingrid Persaud	Love After Love	Apr 2	(United Kingdom)	Faber & Faber		
Kate Pullinger	Forest Green	Apr 28	(Canada)			
Lisa Robertson	The Baudelaire Fractal	Jan 21	(Canada)			
Monique Roffey	The Mermaid of Black Conch	Apr 2	(United Kingdom)	Peepal Tree Press		
Lydia Sandgren	Samlade verk	Mar 31	(Sweden)	Albert Bonniers Förlag		
Vivek Shraya	The Subtweet	Apr 7	(Canada)			
Ali Smith	Summer	Aug 6	(United Kingdom)	Hamish Hamilton; Anchor		
Cordelia Strube	Misconduct of the Heart	Apr 21	(Canada)			
Douglas Stuart	Shuggie Bain	Feb 11	(United States)	Grove Atlantic		
Zoe Sugg and Amy McCulloch	The Magpie Society: One for Sorrow	Oct 29	(United Kingdom)			
Brandon Taylor	Real Life	Feb 18	(United States)	Riverhead Books		
Souvankham Thammavongsa	How to Pronounce Knife	Apr 7	(Canada)			
Dianne Warren	The Diamond House	Jun 2	(Canada)			
Martha Wells	Network Effect	May 5	(United States)	Tor.com		
Charles Yu	Interior Chinatown	Jan 28	(United States)	Pantheon Books		
C Pam Zhang	How Much of These Hills Is Gold	Apr 7	(United States)	Riverhead Books		

=== Children and young people ===
- Raymond Antrobus – Can Bears Ski? (November 10, UK)
- Sophie Blackall – If You Come to Earth (September 15)
- Peter Brown – The Wild Robot Escapes
- Jordan Ifueko – Raybearer (August 8)
- Tae Keller – When You Trap a Tiger
- Jeff Kinney
  - Diary of a Wimpy Kid: The Deep End (October 27)
  - Rowley Jefferson's Awesome Friendly Adventure (August 4)
- E. Lockhart – Again Again (June 2)
- J. K. Rowling – The Ickabog (November, UK, book publication)
- Trung Le Nguyen – The Magic Fish (graphic novel)
- Jacqueline Wilson – Love Frankie (August 20, UK)
- Scott Rothman (story) and Pete Oswald (art) - Attack of the Underwear Dragon (October 6, 2020)

=== Poetry ===
- Eavan Boland (died 2020) – The Historians (October 29, UK)
- Lana Del Rey – Violet Bent Backwards over the Grass (September 29)
- Carolyn Forché – In The Lateness of The World: Poems (March 10)
- Srikanth Reddy – Underworld Lit (August 4)

=== Drama ===
- Ben Elton – The Upstart Crow
- David Hare – Beat the Devil
- David Williamson – Family Values

=== Non-fiction ===
- Craig Brown – One Two Three Four: The Beatles in Time (April 10, UK)
- Scott Dawson – The Lost Colony and Hatteras Island
- Emily Levesque – The Last Stargazers: The Enduring Story of Astronomy's Vanishing Explorers
- Dara McAnulty – Diary of a Young Naturalist (May 21, UK)
- James Nestor – Breath: The New Science of a Lost Art (May 26)
- Barack Obama - A Promised Land (November 17, US)
- Camilla Pang – Explaining Humans: What Science Can Teach Us about Life, Love and Relationships (March 12, UK)
- Jay Parini – Borges and Me: An Encounter
- Stuart Ritchie – Science Fictions: How Fraud, Bias, Negligence, and Hype Undermine the Search for Truth (July 21, UK)
- Megan Rosenbloom – Dark Archives: A Librarian's Investigation into the Science and History of Books Bound in Human Skin
- Philip Rucker and Carol Leonnig – A Very Stable Genius: Donald J. Trump's Testing of America
- Peter Sloterdijk – Making the Heavens Speak (Den Himmel zum Sprechen bringen) (October 26, Germany)
- Mary Trump – Too Much and Never Enough: How My Family Created the World's Most Dangerous Man (August 11)
- Debora MacKenzie - COVID-19: The Pandemic that Never Should Have Happened, and How to Stop the Next One (June 30)
- Joseph M. Reagle Jr. and Jackie Koerner - Wikipedia @ 20: Stories of an Incomplete Revolution
- Xiaowei Wang - Blockchain Chicken Farm

=== Biography and memoirs ===
- Lee Lawrence – The Louder I Will Sing (September 17, UK)

== Films ==
- The Witches

== Deaths ==
Notable literary deaths in 2020, sorted by date of death
Date	Individual	Background	Age	Cause of death	Ref.
January 5	Sylvia Jukes Morris	British biographer	84		
January 7	Elizabeth Wurtzel	American author (Prozac Nation)	52	Leptomeningeal disease as a complication of metastasized breast cancer	
January 9	Chukwuemeka Ike	Nigerian writer	88		
January 12	Sir Roger Scruton	English philosopher and writer	75	Cancer	
January 16	Christopher Tolkien	British academic and editor, son of J. R. R. Tolkien	95		
January 17	Charles Carrère	Senegalese poet	91		
January 23	Armando Uribe	Chilean writer, National Prize for Literature winner (2004)	86		
January 30	Jörn Donner	Finnish writer	86	Lung disease	
January 31	Mary Higgins Clark	American best-selling author of suspense novels	92		
February 3	George Steiner, FBA	Frenco-American literary critic and essayist (After Babel)	90		
February 4	Kamau Brathwaite	Barbadian poet and academic	89		
February 4	Alice Mayhew	American editor	87		
February 12	Christie Blatchford	Canadian newspaper columnist, writer and broadcaster	68	Cancer	
February 17	Charles Portis	American author (True Grit, Gringos)	86	Alzheimer's disease	
February 21	Lisel Mueller	German-American Pulitzer Prize-winning poet	96		
February 22	Kiki Dimoula	Greek poet	88		
February 24	Clive Cussler	American adventure novelist (Raise the Titanic!) and founder of the National Underwater and Marine Agency (NUMA)	88		
February 25	Grace F. Edwards	American novelist and director of the Harlem Writers Guild	87		
March 2	Barbara Neely	African-American myster writer	78		
March 13	Yang Mu	Taiwanese poet and essayist	79		
March 22	Richard Marek	American editor	86	Esophageal cancer	
March 24	Terrence McNally	American playwright, and librettist	81	COVID-19	
March 30	Tomie dePaola	American author and illustrator	86	Complications from surgery	
April 1	Bruce Dawe	Australian poet	90		
April 2	Patricia Bosworth	American biographer, and memoirist	86	COVID-19	
April 6	Jean Little	Canadian children's fiction author	88		
April 15	Rubem Fonseca	Brazilian writer	94		
April 16	Luis Sepúlveda	Chilean author and journalist	70	COVID-19	
April 25	Per Olov Enquist	Swedish author (The Visit of the Royal Physician)	85	Cancer	
April 27	Eavan Boland	Irish poet	75	Stroke	
April 29	Yahya Hassan	Danish poet and political activist	24		
April 29	Maj Sjowall	Swedish crime writer	84		
May 4	Michael McClure	American beat poet, playwright, and songwriter, who read at the Six Gallery reading	87	Complications from a stroke	
May 12	Carolyn Reidy	American publisher and head of Simon & Schuster	71	Heart attack	
May 27	Larry Kramer	American playwright (The Normal Heart) and LGBT rights activist	84	Pneumonia	
June 2	Hiber Conteris	Uruguayan literary critic	86		
June 3	Bruce Jay Friedman	American humorist, novelist, and playwright	90		
June 13	Jean Raspail	French author (The Camp of the Saints)	94		
June 19	Carlos Ruiz Zafón	Spanish author (The Shadow of the Wind)	55	Colorectal cancer	
June 28	Rudolfo Anaya	American author (Bless Me, Ultima), founder of Chicano literature	82		
July 7	Elizabeth Harrower	Australian novelist	92		
July 8	Brad Watson	American author	64		
July 12	Joanna Cole	American author (The Magic School Bus)	75	Idiopathic pulmonary fibrosis	
August 3	Shirley Ann Grau	American Pulitzer Prize-winning writer (The Keepers of the House)	91	Complications from a Stroke	
August 5	Eric Bentley	American theater critic	103		
August 5	Pete Hamill	American journalist and author	85	Heart and kidney failure	
August 10	Jacobo Langsner	Uruguayan screenwriter and playwright	93		
August 24	Gail Sheehy	American journalist and author (Hillary's Choice)	83	Complications of pneumonia	
August 28	Randall Kenan	American short story writer and author	57		
September 1	Shanna Hogan	American true crime writer	37	Home accident	
September 2	David Graeber	American anthropologist, activist, social critic, and author (Debt: The First 5000 Years)	59	Necrotic pancreatitis	
September 12	Florence Howe	American author, publisher, literary scholar, and historian, founder of Feminist Press	91	Complications from Parkinson's disease	
September 14	Anne Stevenson	British-American poet and author	87	Heart failure	
September 16	Stanley Crouch	American jazz critic, playwright, novelist, public intellectual, and essayist	74	COVID-19	
September 17	Terry Goodkind	American science-fiction and fantasy writer	72		
September 17	Winston Groom	American author (Forrest Gump)	77	Heart attack	
September 23	Sir Harold Evans	British-American journalist and author (The American Century)	92	Congestive heart failure	
September 23	Emyr Humphreys	Welsh-language writer	101		
October 1	Derek Mahon	Irish poet and journalist	78		
October 5	Ruth Klüger	Austrian-American author and academic	88		
October 25	Diane Di Prima	American poet	86		
October 26	Daniel Menaker	American editor at Random House and The New Yorker	79	Pancreatic cancer	
October 27	Julia O'Faolain	Irish writer	88		
October 31	Joan Bingham	American co-founder and executive director of Grove Atlantic	85	Pneumonia	
November 4	Naomi Long Madgett	American poet laureate, founder of Lotus Press, and “the godmother of African-American poetry”	97		
November 6	Luke Rhinehart	American novelist, screenwriter, and nonfiction writer	87		
November 6	Natan Zach	Israeli poet	89	Complications of Alzheimer's disease	
November 6	Mikhail Zhvanetsky	Soviet and Russian writer and satirist	86		
November 9	Joan Drury	American writer, publisher, and indie bookseller	75		
November 20	Jan Morris	British journalist	94		
November 29	Ben Bova	American science fiction writer and magazine editor (Analog)	88	COVID-19-related pneumonia and a stroke	
December 1	Miguel Algarín	Puerto Rican poet and founder of Nuyorican Poets Café	79	Sepsis	
December 3	Alison Lurie	American Pulitzer Prize-winning novelist (Foreign Affairs)	94		
December 8	Anthony Veasna So	American short story writer	28	Accidental drug overdose	
December 12	John le Carré	English author (Tinker Tailor Soldier Spy)	89	Complications from a fall	

== Awards ==
The following list is arranged alphabetically:

- Akutagawa Prize: Haneko Takayama, Shuri no Uma (首里の馬)
- Anisfield-Wolf Book Award: Namwali Serpell, The Old Drift
- Baillie Gifford Prize:
- Booker Prize: Douglas Stuart, Shuggie Bain
- Bookseller/Diagram Prize for Oddest Title of the Year: A Dog Pissing at the Edge of a Path: Animal Metaphors in Eastern Indonesian Society by Gregory Forth.
- Caine Prize for African Writing: Irenosen Okojie, "Grace Jones"
- Camões Prize: Vítor Manuel de Aguiar e Silva
- Carnegie Medal: Anthony McGowan, Lark
- Costa Book Awards: Monique Roffey, The Mermaid of Black Conch (novel prize and overall Book of the Year)
- Danuta Gleed Literary Award: Zalika Reid-Benta, Frying Plantain
- David Cohen Prize: not awarded this year
- Desmond Elliott Prize: Derek Owusu, That Reminds Me
- Dylan Thomas Prize: Bryan Washington, Lot
- Edgar Award
- European Book Prize: Pavol Rankov, Stalo sa prvého septembra (alebo inokedy) and Kapka Kassabova, Border: a journey to the edge of Europe
- Folio Prize: Valeria Luiselli, Lost Children Archive
- Friedenspreis des Deutschen Buchhandels: Amartya Kumar Sen
- German Book Prize: Anne Weber, Annette, ein Heldinnenepos
- Goldsmiths Prize: M. John Harrison, The Sunken Land Begins to Rise Again
- Gordon Burn Prize: Peter Pomerantsev, This Is Not Propaganda
- Governor General's Award for English-language fiction: Michelle Good, Five Little Indians
- Governor General's Award for French-language fiction: Sophie Létourneau, Chasse à l'homme
- Governor General's Awards, other categories: See 2020 Governor General's Awards
- Grand Prix du roman de l'Académie française: Étienne de Montety, La grande épreuve
- Hugo Award for Best Novel: Arkady Martine, A Memory Called Empire
- International Booker Prize: Marieke Lucas Rijneveld, The Discomfort of Evening translated by Michele Hutchison
- International Dublin Literary Award: Anna Burns, Milkman
- International Prize for Arabic Fiction: Abdelouahab Aissaoui, The Spartan Court
- James Tait Black Memorial Prize for Fiction:
- James Tait Black Memorial Prize for Biography:
- Kerry Group Irish Fiction Award: Edna O'Brien, Girl (Faber and Faber)
- Lambda Literary Awards: Multiple categories; see 32nd Lambda Literary Awards.
- Legion of Honour, Chevalier:
- Miguel de Cervantes Prize: Francisco Brines
- Miles Franklin Award: Tara June Winch, The Yield
- National Biography Award:
- National Book Award for Fiction: Charles Yu, Interior Chinatown
- National Book Critics Circle Award:
- Newbery Medal: Jerry Craft, New Kid
- Nike Award: Joanna Gierak-Onoszko: 27 śmierci Toby'ego Obeda
- Nobel Prize in Literature: Louise Glück
- PEN/Faulkner Award for Fiction: Chloe Aridjis, Sea Monsters
- PEN Center USA Fiction Award:
- Premio Planeta de Novela:
- Premio Strega: Sandro Veronesi, Il colibrì
- Pritzker Literature Award for Lifetime Achievement in Military Writing: David M. Glantz
- Prix Goncourt: Hervé Le Tellier, L'anomalie
- Pulitzer Prize for Fiction: Colson Whitehead The Nickel Boys
- Pulitzer Prize for Poetry: Jericho Brown The Tradition
- Queen's Birthday Honours (UK)
- RBC Taylor Prize: Mark Bourrie, Bush Runner
- Rogers Writers' Trust Fiction Prize: Gil Adamson, Ridgerunner
- Russian Booker Prize:
- SAARC Literary Award:
- Scotiabank Giller Prize: Souvankham Thammavongsa, How to Pronounce Knife
- Golden Wreath of Struga Poetry Evenings: Amir Or
- Walter Scott Prize: Christine Dwyer Hickey, The Narrow Land
- Whiting Awards:
  - Drama: Will Arbery
  - Fiction: Andrea Lawlor, Ling Ma, and Genevieve Sly Crane
  - Nonfiction: Jaquira Díaz and Jia Tolentino
  - Poetry: Aria Aber, Dianely Antigua, Jake Skeets, and Genya Turovskaya
- Women's Prize for Fiction: Maggie O'Farrell, Hamnet
- W.Y. Boyd Literary Award for Excellence in Military Fiction: Ralph Peterson, Darkness at Chancellorsville
- Zbigniew Herbert International Literary Award: Durs Grünbein
