= A Beautiful Crime =

2020 novel by Christopher Bollen

- Author: Christopher Bollen
- Publisher: Harper
- Publication date: January 28, 2020
- Publication place: United States
- ISBN: 978-0-06-285388-2 (1st ed. Hardcover)
- OCLC: 1090282704
- Dewey Decimal: 813/.6
- LC Class: PS3602.O6545 B43 2020

A Beautiful Crime is a 2020 crime fiction novel by the American writer and editor Christopher Bollen. It is Bollen's fourth novel and was written in 2018 during a residency in Paris. The novel was first published in the United States by Harper on January 28, 2020.

The story, which is set in Venice, centers on boyfriends Nick Brink and Clay Guillory, who sell an inherited collection of forged silver antiques to a wealthy acquaintance from Clay's past. Their deception quickly leads to more serious crimes, as Clay attempts to sell an expensive property that he does not fully own and Nick murders a silver appraiser who threatened to expose their initial scheme. Bollen described A Beautiful Crime as his most personal novel to date, and elements of the plot and character backgrounds are inspired by his own life. The novel explores the overtourism and depopulation of Venice, and the intersection of greed, morality, and social class.

A Beautiful Crime was a finalist for the 2020 Los Angeles Times Book Prize in the mystery/thriller category. It received a mixed critical reception; reviewers generally praised Bollen's depictions of Venice and the relationships between the characters but disagreed on the effectiveness of the narrative's pace. The book has drawn comparisons to novels by Patricia Highsmith, particularly The Talented Mr. Ripley (1955).

== Plot ==
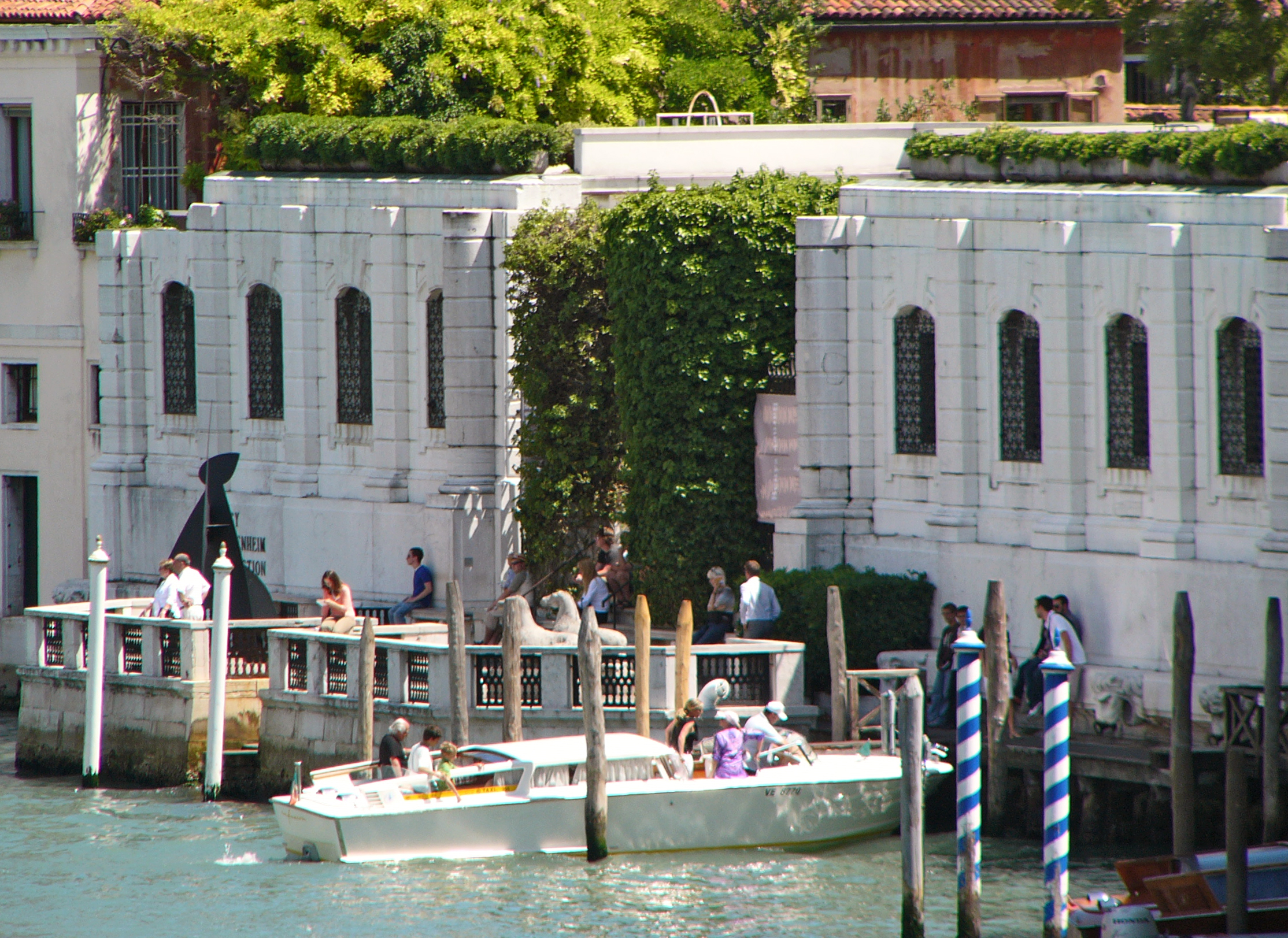
The Peggy Guggenheim Collection

Nick Brink and his boyfriend Clay Guillory arrive in Venice, leaving behind their lives in New York City. They first met two months earlier at the memorial service of Freddy van der Haar, Clay's previous boyfriend who bequeathed to him a collection of silver antiques and his share of a Venetian palazzo nicknamed "Il Dormitorio". After Nick and Clay learned that the antiques were forgeries, they devised a plan to settle their debts by selling the pieces to Richard West, a wealthy American expatriate who finances cultural conservation projects in Venice. Four years ago, while Clay interned at the Peggy Guggenheim Collection, he also worked as Richard's personal assistant. When he failed to gain a permanent post at the museum, Clay was devastated to learn Richard was responsible for his rejection and has since held a grudge against him.

Nick intentionally runs into Richard and poses as an expert silver appraiser while concealing his relationship with Clay. He is invited to a dinner party at Richard's home, which shares a wall with Il Dormitorio. A few days later, Nick performs a spurious authentication and persuades Richard to purchase the silver for $750,000. Nick and Clay celebrate their successful transaction, but Nick begins to worry how long the money will last and devises a plan to sell Il Dormitorio to Richard, who has long wanted to merge it with his own residence. Clay is reluctant because the property partly belongs to Freddy's estranged sister Cecilia, but he eventually agrees to the scheme and flies to Paris to arrange forged documents identifying him as the sole owner.

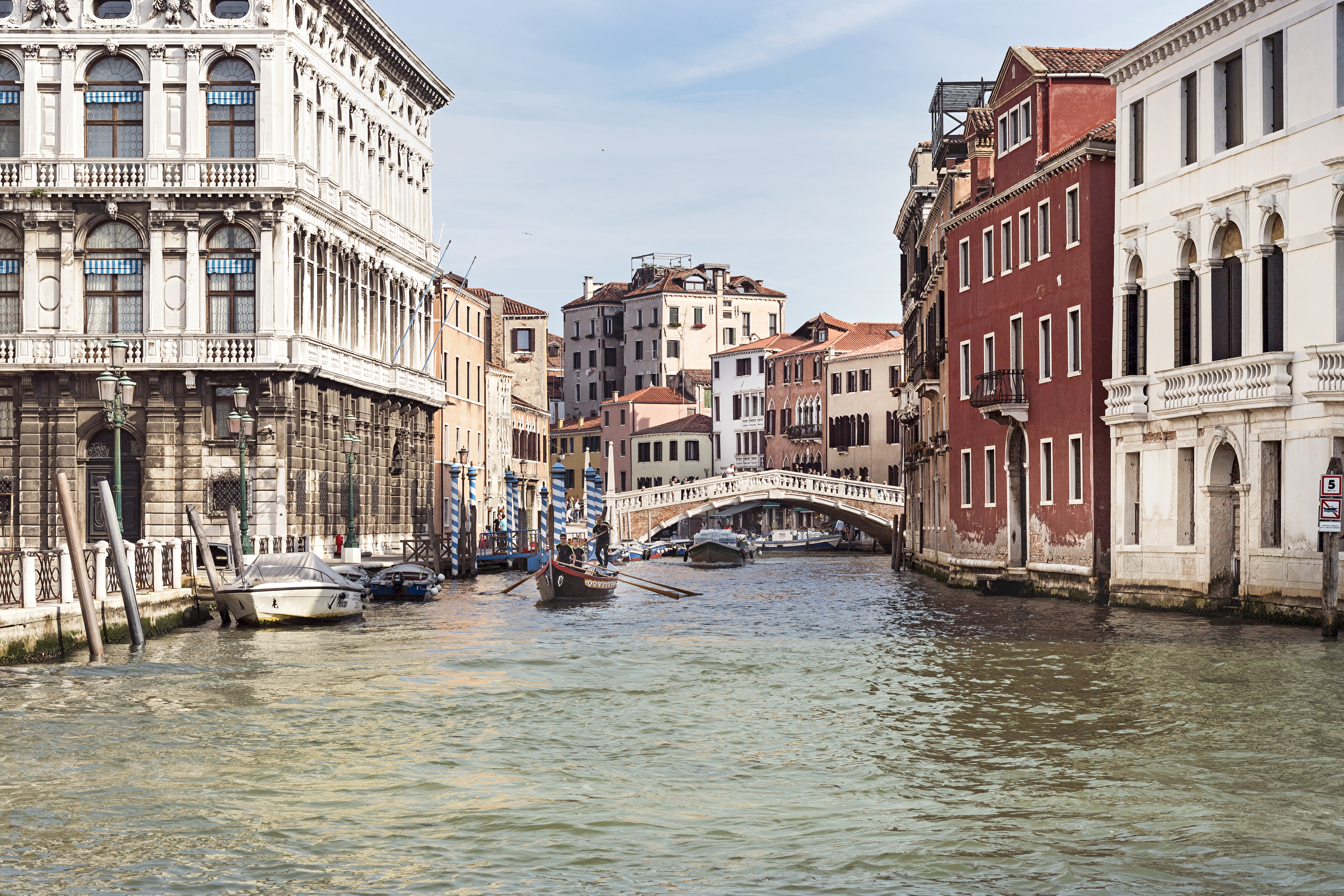
The district of Cannaregio, where Il Dormitorio is located

Nick visits Richard again, hoping to persuade him to complete the purchase of Il Dormitorio, but he is horrified to see Dulles Hawkes, a retired silver appraiser whom Richard has invited to view his newly purchased antiques. Dulles immediately detects the forgeries but plays along with the ruse, and he later threatens to divulge the scam unless Nick has sex with him in his hotel that night. Nick is forced to oblige. Afterwards, Dulles continues to blackmail Nick, insisting they will have sex again the next day and demanding half of the profits of the scam. A panicked Nick follows Dulles to the hotel elevator, which is under repair, and impulsively pushes him down the empty elevator shaft. Dulles dies on impact and Nick flees the hotel.

Clay agrees to sell Il Dormitorio to Richard for four million euros. On his way to the final meeting to complete the transaction, Clay is stopped by Richard's assistant Battista, who has discovered Richard has been anonymously financing a planned tourist development in the city. Battista, a vocal protester against the development, tells Clay the meeting is a trap; Richard has traced Cecilia, discovered the documents are forgeries, and notified the police. Richard, who is still unaware of Nick and Clay's relationship, casually reveals the setup to Nick. Enraged, Nick fights with Richard and strikes him in the head with a doorstop. Clay is suspected in the investigation but Battista provides an alibi and exposes Richard as the anonymous investor. The attack is ultimately attributed to an unknown protester. Richard, who has been rendered indefinitely mute from the attack, is transferred to a neurological clinic in Leipzig. Nick moves to a nearby island to avoid scrutiny while Clay remains in Venice, and they continue to communicate discreetly. Five months later, Clay travels to the island when they decide it is safe for him to do so, and they joyfully reunite.

== Background and publication history ==
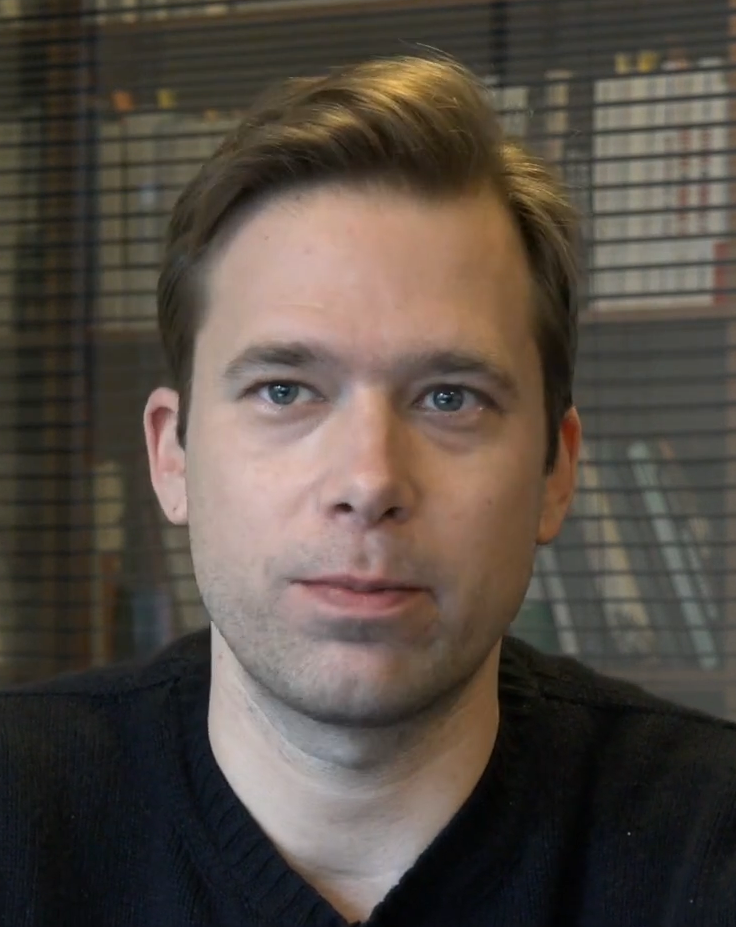
Bollen in 2016

A Beautiful Crime is Christopher Bollen's fourth novel following Lightning People (2011), Orient (2015), and The Destroyers (2017). Bollen incorporated aspects of his own life into the plot and characters; for instance, both he and Nick grew up in Ohio and like Clay, he was an intern at the Peggy Guggenheim Collection after graduating from college.

The Venetian apartment where Nick stays is modeled on an apartment near Campo Santa Margherita where Bollen lived during his internship. Nick is partly based on the character of Daisy Miller from the eponymous 1879 novella by Henry James. Comparing the characters, Bollen described Daisy as someone who is "lovely but reckless and falls into danger". Bollen chose to feature an interracial relationship between Nick, who is white, and Clay, who is Black, to represent "two all-American guys" and to highlight diversity within the LGBT community. The character Freddy van der Haar, who represents the older generation of gay men living in New York, was inspired by the American photographer David Armstrong and had a more prominent role in the novel's first draft.

Bollen has described A Beautiful Crime as his most personal novel to date. He dedicated the book to fellow novelist Edmund White, who he described as "someone who I really admired who blazed the trail for me", citing their shared Cincinnati roots and White's works of gay literature. White had previously dedicated his 2016 novel Our Young Man to Bollen. In an interview with Vogue Italia, Bollen credited Toto Bergamo Rossi, the director of a cultural conservation nonprofit in Venice, with teaching him about Italy's architecture and the Italian language while he was researching for the book. Bollen wrote A Beautiful Crime while living in a 17th‑century Parisian monastery during a 2018 residency; Clay's brief trip to Paris in the novel is the result of Bollen's promise to his sponsoring organization to set one of the book's chapters in that city.

A Beautiful Crime was published in the United States by Harper as a 400-page hardcover edition on January 28, 2020. Harper Perennial published the paperback version on January 12, 2021. Tim Paige narrated the 11-hour audiobook, which was released by Harper Audio. AudioFile's review of the audiobook praised the emotions conveyed by Paige's narration but characterized his accents for secondary characters as "inconsistent".

== Themes ==
=== Overtourism ===
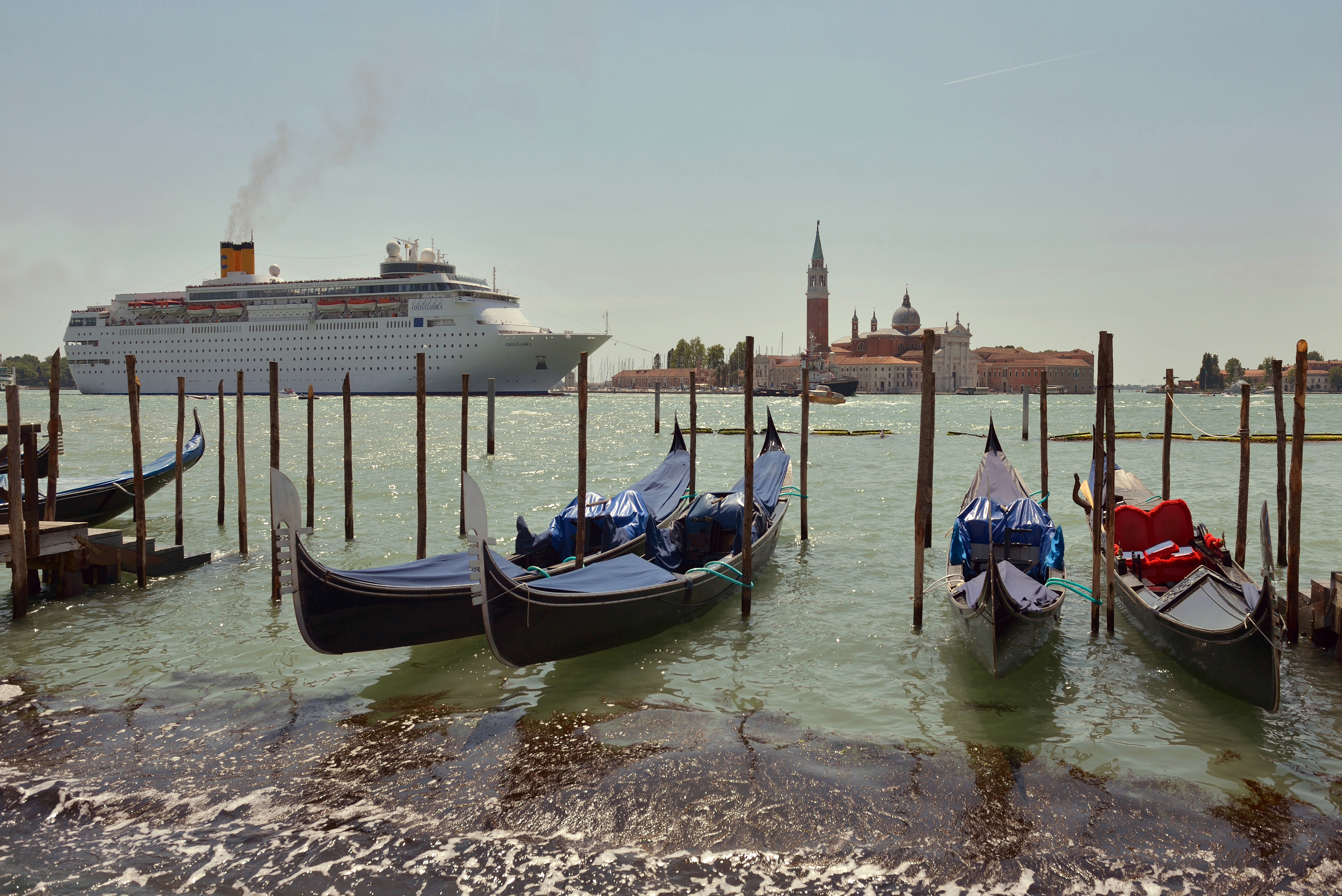
A cruise ship passing by the San Marco basin in Venice

Venice is a popular destination for tourists. In 2019, the city was estimated to have 25 million visitors annually. Analyses of overtourism in Venice have reported negative impacts such as overcrowding, a decline in permanent residents corresponding to a rise in vacation rentals, and an increase in generated waste. Bollen, who has called for the banning of cruise ships and Airbnb rentals from the city, wrote in an article for The Daily Beast that A Beautiful Crime depicts Venice as a city in crisis that is "caught in the jaws of a mighty shark".

The book explores the city's overtourism and depopulation, negatively depicting the rise of Airbnb rentals in the city and including a scene of residents protesting against foreign investments and chanting "Mi non vado via mi resto!" ("I do not go away, I stay!"). John Copenhaver, writing for the Lambda Literary Foundation, said the book's "central crime" is not Nick and Clay's schemes but Venice's "siege by tourism and foreign developers", and that the narrative's underlying mystery is the identity of those who are destroying the city, representing the destruction of Nick and Clay's vision for their future.

=== Greed and morality ===
During a press interview for The Destroyers, Bollen said he wanted to create gay characters who are "complicated in a different and new way" for his next work. Though Nick is introduced as a charming, naïve Midwesterner, his greed leads to disastrous consequences, including the murder of Dulles. Brian Alessandro of Newsday described Bollen's casting of Nick and Clay as morally ambiguous criminals as "plucking gay characters out of the ghettos of victimhood or sainthood", and that they are ultimately forced to face the consequences of their actions. Even as Nick and Clay commit crimes for money and revenge, they are portrayed in a sympathetic light.

Issues of social class recur throughout the novel; Nick and Clay's scheme to sell forgeries to Richard is rooted in a desire for "upward social mobility in this materialistic milieu". In their interactions with Richard, other characters, and each other, Bollen highlights the effects of social inequality on the characters' decisions and senses of identity. In pursuit of financial security, Nick and Clay seek to reinvent themselves in Venice, at the price of their criminal actions.

== Reception ==
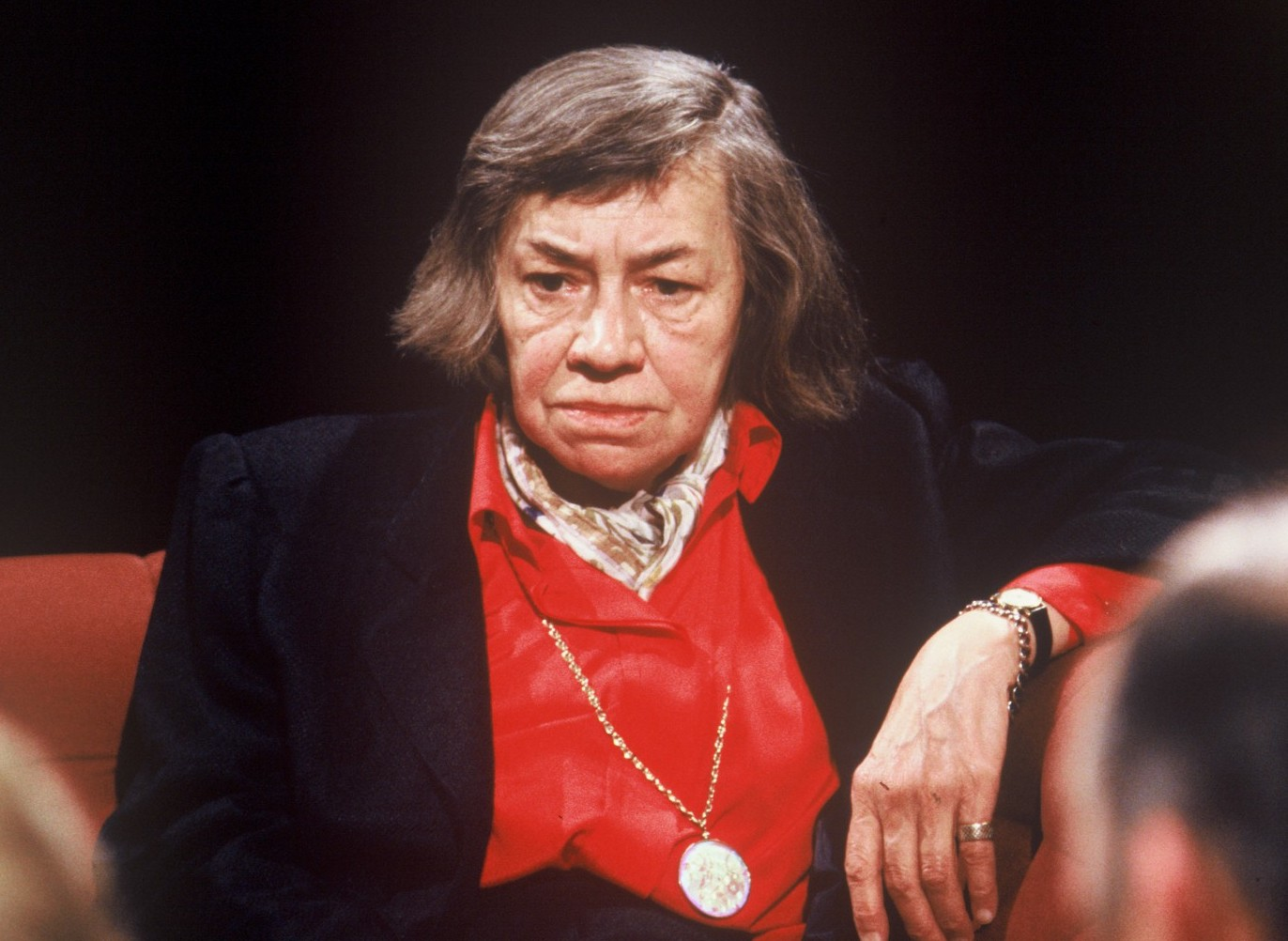
A Beautiful Crime has drawn comparisons to works by Patricia Highsmith (pictured in 1988).

Literary critics have compared A Beautiful Crime to Patricia Highsmith's novels—particularly The Talented Mr. Ripley (1955)—citing similar characteristics such as criminal protagonists and moral ambiguity. The book has also been compared to works by Alan Hollinghurst, including his 1988 novel The Swimming-Pool Library. A Beautiful Crime was one of five finalists for the 2020 Los Angeles Times Book Prize in the mystery/thriller category and was listed by O, The Oprah Magazine as one of the top 20 books of 2020. The New York Times described the book as an "elegant crime thriller", and it received starred reviews in Publishers Weekly, Kirkus Reviews, and BookPage.

Several reviewers praised the sympathetic characterization of Bollen's protagonists and his examination of Clay's Black identity in the context of racism in the LGBT community. In his review, Alessandro described the novel's exploration of Nick and Clay's relationship, especially as it is tested by the obstacles they encounter, as "sincere and deep". A reviewer for Publishers Weekly concurred, writing that while the titular crime is the focus of the plot, "the story gains its strength from its look at gay romance". Patrick Sullivan, writing for Library Journal, also commended the depictions of Clay's relationships with Freddy and Nick.

Michael Cart of Booklist described A Beautiful Crime as "deftly paced and plotted", but Randy Rosenthal wrote in the Los Angeles Review of Books it "not only lacks literary artistry, but it also lacks the thrill of a thriller". Rosenthal criticized the pace of the beginning of the novel as too slow, and said the plot, characters, and language are not realistic. He found the plot toward the end more engaging and applauded Bollen's examination of overtourism in Venice. In a review for The Washington Post, Dennis Drabelle questioned Bollen's optimistic portrayal of Nick's and Clay's relationship in "the dishonest and brutal world [they] inhabit" but praised the novel's suspense and its depiction of Venice. Katherine B. Weissman of Bookreporter found secondary characters such as Battista and Dulles to be more interesting than Nick and Clay, praised the level of suspense and the setting, and described Bollen's characterization of Venice as "both accurate and eloquent".
