= 400 Days =

400 Days may refer to:

- 400 Days (film), a 2015 film directed by Matt Osterman
- 400 Days (novel), a 2021 novel by Chetan Bhagat
- 400 Days (video game), DLC content released in 2013 for The Walking Dead

== See also ==
- 40 Days
