= The Destroyers (novel) =

2017 novel by Christopher Bollen

- Author: Christopher Bollen
- Language: English
- Genre: Thriller
- Publisher: HarperCollins
- Publication date: June 27, 2017
- Publication place: United States
- Pages: 480
- ISBN: 978-0-06-232998-1

The Destroyers is a 2017 thriller novel by Christopher Bollen. It is Bollen's third novel, following Lightning People (2011) and Orient (2015). The novel was first published in the United States by Harper on June 27, 2017. The plot follows Ian Bledsoe, who travels to Patmos to seek help from his childhood friend, Charlie Konstantinou, and finds himself having to handle the fallout from Charlie's sudden and mysterious disappearance.

== Reception ==
Thad Ziolkowski of The New York Times described it as an "impressive literary thriller" and praised Bollen's depictions of Greece, but criticized one of the subplots as "clumsy". A reviewer for Publishers Weekly commented that the ending felt rushed, but commended the characters' portrayals and detailed backgrounds.
