= Valmiki's Daughter =

2008 novel by Shani Mootoo

- First edition cover – late printing
- Author: Shani Mootoo
- Language: English
- Genre: Fiction
- Publisher: House of Anansi Press Inc
- Publication date: 2008
- Publication place: Canada
- Media type: Print (hardback & paperback)
- ISBN: 978-0-88784-837-7

Valmiki's Daughter is a novel by Shani Mootoo published in 2008. It was nominated for the 2009 Scotiabank Giller Prize. Set in the modern-day Caribbean, the book features vivid depictions of culture drawn from Mootoo’s own background as a Trinidadian author. The book’s unique perspective on storytelling alternates between Valmiki, a renowned doctor, and his daughter, Viveka. Both are closeted homosexuals, struggling to cope with the pressure of growing up in a homophobic environment.

The book sits among several of Mootoo's novels that address the tensions dealing with sexuality in the Caribbean, a topic relevant to Shani Mootoo’s own background growing up a lesbian in a family intolerant of homosexuality.

== Plot ==
Set in modern Trinidad, Valmiki's Daughter is centered around the Krishnu family, which consists of Valmiki, Viveka, Vashti, and Devika. The husband, Valmiki, is a closeted gay doctor in an unaccepting environment. He learns about this part of his identity when, while attending school in England, he becomes involved in a relationship with an upper classmate named Tony. However, his guilt about his own sexuality persuades him to pursue a life of marrying Devika rather than staying with Tony whom he truly loves. However, despite his discomfort with his homosexuality, he still goes on hunting trips to liaise with his lover, Saul. After each trip, he brings birds back to his family as a gift. Throughout the book, Mootoo illustrates that Valmiki's relationship with his wife is much more platonic than his sexual relations with Saul. Valmiki is not willing to come out because he is a well-respected doctor amongst his peers, and it would be a humiliating experience that would cost him his reputation.

Valmiki's elder daughter, Viveka, is a closeted lesbian. She undergoes a similar high school experience as her dad, struggling with her own sexual orientation and identity. After seeing a fellow student named Merle Bedi was outcast from her family because of her sexuality, Viveka realizes how unaccepting the people around her are of her sexuality. In order to avoid ending up in a similar situation, Viveka deliberately makes decisions that will steer her in a different direction . This constant pressure prevents Viveka from ever becoming completely comfortable with her lesbian identity. Despite being homosexual himself, Valmiki is outwardly opposed to the idea of his daughters being lesbian. He feels very firmly that she should not have to go through the same struggle that he underwent as a child. This extreme caution leads him to deny her any participation in a women-only sports club for fear that she will develop lesbian tendencies. Both Valmiki and his wife Devika are more comfortable with the identity of their younger daughter Vashti. Unlike her older sister, Vashti conforms to most of the female gender stereotypes. Viveka sees her sister as an ongoing pressure to conform to cultural ideals.

In what seems to be a separate plot at the start, a French woman named Anick Prakash moves away from her parents in France to marry a Trinidadian man named Nayan. Her parents are quite unhappy with this decision due to their bias against Trinidadian culture and people. The disagreement causes tension in the family. After growing up in France, Anick has great difficulty adapting to the extreme cultural differences. The two plots then intertwine when Anick, while living in Trinidad, meets and quickly befriends Viveka. They bond over common experiences such tension with parents, and soon fall in love. Despite her affair with Viveka, Anick is still married to Nayan and becomes pregnant as a result. Feeling alienated and unable to adapt to Trinidadian culture, Anick proposes to Viveka that they run away together. To Anick's dismay, Viveka refuses because she cannot fully accept her identity as a lesbian. Falling into the same pattern as her father, Viveka succumbs to the social pressure and ends up marrying a man named Trevor. Much like Valmiki, she would rather lie about her sexual identity and marry a man, than have to come out as gay in front of a whole community simply to live with the woman she truly loves.

== Characters ==
=== Valmiki Krishnu ===
Valmiki Krishnu is a Trinidadian doctor who is well-respected by his peers. He has a wife named Devika and two daughters, Vashti and Viveka. He is a closeted homosexual, and feels extremely pressured to hide it since he lives in a homophobic environment. Therefore, he decides to break up with his secret lover, Tony, and marry Devika. However, Valmiki himself is also uncomfortable with his sexual identity, a struggle which is seen in several characters throughout the book. Although he has had several heterosexual affairs in the past, none are comparable to his relationship with Saul. Every weekend, they go out on hunting trips in order to make love. Every weekend, Valmiki captures and brings back birds to his family as an attempt to convince his wife that he is not having an affair. However, Devika sees through this guise quickly, and soon learns that her husband is in fact sexually affiliated with his hunting partner.

=== Viveka Krishnu ===
Valmiki's older daughter and sister to Vashti. Like her father, she is a closeted homosexual. Throughout the book, she struggles with this part of her identity, similar to the struggle that her father encountered. She later becomes involved in a relationship with Anick, which eventually falls apart when Anick gets pregnant. In the end, like her father, she decides to marry Trevor, who knows the relationship between Anick and Viveka.

=== Vashti Krishnu ===
Vashti is the younger daughter of the Krishnu family. She resembles the generalization of an innocent girl, who conforms to a lot female stereotypes. Her parents vocally favor her lifestyle over that of her older sister Viveka.

=== Devika Krishnu ===
Married to Valmiki, Devika is the mother of the Krishnu family, with daughters Vashti and Viveka. She disapproves Viveka's request to allow her to join the local women-only sports club. She wants Viveka to behave like a proper "Upper-middle class Indian girl".

=== Tony ===
Tony was Valmiki's first love in medical school. Valmiki still calls Tony occasionally when he needs to be comforted. Unlike with Saul, whom Valmiki only loves sexually, Valmiki loves Tony in a romantic way.

=== Merle Bedi ===
Merle is one of Viveka's high school friends who is banned from the family and school. In contrast to Vashti Krishnu, who is the stereotypical innocent girl, Merle is a lesbian and is abandoned by her family because of it.

=== Trevor ===
Viveka's husband who works as a mechanical engineer in an airport. He has been traveling all around the world. He learns of the lesbian relationship between Viveka and Aneck, and is intrigued.

=== Anick Prakash ===
Anick is the wife of Nayan, and later, the lover of Viveka. Being initially from France, she has trouble adapting to Trinidadian culture. Ultimately, this causes the breakdown of her relationship with Nayan. She has very strong feelings for Viveka throughout the novel, but in the end, she gets pregnant and her relationship with Viveka ends.

=== Nayan Prakash ===
Nayan Prakash is a Trinidadian native, and the husband of Anick. He is a cacao farmer.

=== Saul Joseph ===
Saul is a hunter and Valmiki's lover. He is mostly Indian, but partly of African origin as well. He is a lower class citizen than Valmiki. He is lean and muscular. Every Friday, he and Valmiki go on a hunting trip during which they also have sex.

== Major themes ==
- Love: Arguably the most important theme in this book is the theme of love. The author shows many different kinds of love in her novel. Valmiki loves Devika romantically, but loves Saul sexually. Anick loves Nayan and Viveka, and they love her back. At the end of the book, Viveka marries Trevor, but she doesn't love him the way she loved Anick. Throughout Valmiki's Daughter, Mootoo shows the reader that love isn't just a single switch, but rather, a much more complex plane.
- Sexuality: One of the other large themes is sexuality. Mootoo has written multiple books centered around the topic of sexuality and sexual orientation in Trinidad and Tobago. Among these is her best known novel Cereus Blooms at Night, which addresses similar sexual tensions to the ones described in Valmiki's Daughter. The three most prominent characters all struggle with their sexual identity through the book. In the case of Valmiki, he is in a tough spot because he is a homosexual man living in a homophobic environment, which ends up making Valmiki himself homophobic. As one can imagine, being homophobic and homosexual is not easy and usually ends up in self-hatred. Viveka also struggles to understand her sexual identity through the novel. She is an essentially closeted lesbian, and even though she has a very deep and loving relationship with Anick, she too succumbs to the homophobia of her environment and marries Trevor instead.
- National identity: Throughout the novel, the characters, especially Anick, struggle with their national identities. Many of Anick's actions are driven by her conceptions about her French heritage and the Trinidadian heritage of her husband Nayan, and her lover Viveka.
- Religion: Hinduism is practiced in the novel, primarily by the Krishnu family.
- Class: Class is an important theme in this novel, with class-based tension occurring between Anick and Nayan.

== Style ==
The writing in Valmiki's Daughter is heavily reliant on description. Mootoo spends much of her textual real estate describing the scenery and the culture of the book's setting. There are also numerous mentions of food throughout the novel. In an interview with Shani Mootoo, she explains that this was incorporated unconsciously since food is a core part of Trinidadian culture. "Though Irish by birth, she reflected strongly on her Trinidadian parentage" when reading an excerpt of her book aloud during the University of the West Indies Literature Week.

== Background ==
"Given the acute tensions around sexuality in the Caribbean societies, Mootoo's fictions are compelling in their themes". Mootoo has written several books with similar subject matter. Some elements of the book can be described as biographical. In a Trinidadian newspaper article, Mootoo describes her experiences being the lesbian daughter of a homophobic father. Viveka undergoes a similar experience, feeling constant pressure from her parents to homosexuality. She wrote Valmiki's Daughter on a related theme, dealing with the struggles of homosexuals in a Trinidadian society.

== Reception ==
Valmiki's Daughter was placed on the longlist for the 2009 Giller Prize. It received an overall rating of 3.5 stars from the website goodreads.com. Shani Mootoo's work has been noted as a "breaking of Caribbean literary silence around sexuality and non-normalizing desire".
