= Eslanda =

Eslanda is a given name. Notable people with the name include:

- Eslanda Goode Robeson (1895–1965), American anthropologist, author, actor, and civil rights activist
- Lady Eslanda, fictional character in The Ickabog
