= Fake Baby =

2020 novel by Amy McDaid

- Author: Amy McDaid
- Language: English
- Set in: Auckland
- Publisher: Penguin Books New Zealand
- Publication date: 2020
- Publication place: New Zealand
- Pages: 304 (1st edition)
- ISBN: 9780143774648 (1st edition)

Fake Baby is a 2020 novel by New Zealand author Amy McDaid. The novel is McDaid's debut, and it follows three characters living in Auckland and grappling with grief, trauma and mental illness. The novel was longlisted for the fiction prize at the 2021 Ockham New Zealand Book Awards and shortlisted for the Best First Book of Fiction.

== Plot ==
The novel is a darkly comic satire about three people experiencing grief, loss and mental illness.

Stephen, Jaavni and Lucas all live in Auckland. Stephen, a mentally ill man in his 60s, believes his dead father is evil and intending to destroy the world. Jaanvi, a young woman grieving the loss of her own child, steals a lifelike fake baby. Lucas, a pharmacist in his mid-40s, is dealing with a crisis at his work. McDaid's novel examines the impact of trauma on these characters and their lives.

== Background ==
At the time of the book's publication, Amy McDaid worked at Starship Hospital as a neonatal intensive care nurse. She completed the Master of Creative Writing programme at the University of Auckland in 2017 under Paula Morris, and worked part-time on her debut novel for four years before its publication. For the draft of her novel she won the Sir James Wallace Prize, awarded to the most outstanding manuscript in the university's creative writing programme.

== Reception ==
Fake Baby was longlisted for the top fiction prize at the 2021 Ockham New Zealand Book Awards, and shortlisted for the prize for best first book. It was named by The Listener as one of the best 101 books of 2020. Steve Braunias writing for Newsroom named it as one of the ten best novels of the year.

Catherine Robertson for Landfall said that McDaid "pulls off a bravura balancing act of near-farcical comic delivery and intensely moving content". Reviewer Sam Brooks for The Spinoff wrote:

By the end of Fake Baby, [McDaid has] shown us, with delicate detail and real generosity, the truth that even a small kindness, a silent memorandum of care and understanding, can lift someone up above the surface, even for just one more day. It's those daily kindnesses that build up to a life loved, and finally, a life lived.

Mark Broatch in The Wednesday Review (published by the Academy of New Zealand Literature) said that for a debut novel, "Fake Baby gets a great deal right". While he was unimpressed by the book's symbolism and the number of "troubled characters", he praised the authenticity, humour and "splendid lines". Broatch ultimately concluded that "the plates stay up, and all the strands come together in a way that's not too neat".
