= 400 Days (novel) =

Novel by Chetan Bhagat

- First edition
- Author: Chetan Bhagat
- Language: Indian English
- Genre: Mystery, Thriller
- Set in: India
- Publisher: Westland Publications
- Publication date: 8 October 2021
- Publication place: India
- Media type: Paperback
- Pages: 352
- ISBN: 978-1542094085
- Preceded by: One Arranged Murder

400 Days is a 2021 mystery novel by Indian author Chetan Bhagat. It is the third instalment in the Keshav–Saurabh series, following The Girl in Room 105 (2018) and One Arranged Murder (2020). The novel combines mystery and romance, centring on the disappearance of a 12-year-old girl and her mother's efforts to find her.

== Plot ==
Following the events of One Arranged Murder, Keshav and Saurabh are living with Keshav's parents in a gated community called Icon. While preparing for a career as an IPS officer, Keshav is approached by Alia Arora, a neighbour whose 12-year-old daughter, Siya, has been missing for nine months. Despite his initial reluctance, Keshav takes up the case, drawn by his passion for detective work and the promise of a substantial reward.

As Keshav and Saurabh investigate, they uncover troubling details about Alia's family life and the circumstances surrounding Siya's disappearance. The only witness is Siya's younger sister, Suhana, whose account of the abduction offers a few unusual clues. With the police investigation having reached a dead end, the detectives must piece together the evidence and follow leads that grow increasingly complicated.

The investigation takes Keshav into the world of online interactions, family secrets, and unexpected suspects. As he attempts to earn Suhana's trust and uncover the truth, his growing closeness to Alia adds a personal dimension to an already challenging case.

With time running out, Keshav and Saurabh must determine what happened to Siya and whether the clues they have uncovered will lead them to her. The investigation tests their detective skills while forcing Keshav to confront the complexities of relationships, responsibility, and the choices that come with pursuing the truth.

== Reception ==
- Sankalpita from Book Geeks gave it mediocre ratings, stating that its plot is "pretty much non-existent", but that it is an easy read, especially for people with beginner level English.
- Sahana Hegde from Scroll.in gave the book a mixed review, and said that "despite its clichéd ingredients, Chetan Bhagat’s new novel is his most readable yet".
