= When These Mountains Burn =

2020 novel by David Joy

- Author: David Joy
- Genre: Crime fiction
- Published: 2020

When These Mountains Burn is a 2020 novel by David Joy.

== Plot summary ==
Raymond Mathis, a 70 year old ex-United States Forest Service employee, has recently become a widower. His adult son Ricky is addicted to drugs and is kidnapped by dealers who ransom him to Raymond.

== Background ==
The novel is set during the 2016 Southeastern United States wildfires, the drug epidemic in the United States, and the encroachment of coyote populations. It is portrays the erosion of mountain culture in North Carolina and the reclamation of Cherokee culture in the 21st century.

== Reception ==
The novel received positive reviews from critics. Kirkus Reviews praised its "memorable characters, deft plotting, and an attention to detail". Tod Goldberg of USA Today called the novel "a snapshot of small-town America at a fracture point, when the least of the concerns is the fire that could consume everyone, all at once."
