= Pasha Malla =

Canadian author

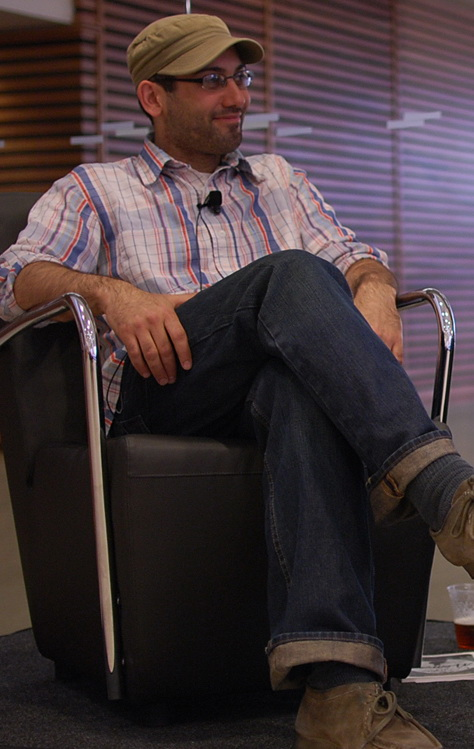
- Born: Pasha Malla; St. John's, Newfoundland and Labrador
- Occupation: Writer
- Writing career
- Period: 2000s–present
- Notable works: The Withdrawal Method, People Park

Pasha Malla is a Canadian author.

He was born in St. John's, Newfoundland, and raised in London, Ontario. He attended Concordia University in Montreal as a graduate student. During his days in London, Ontario, Pasha attended Sir Frederick Banting S.S, where he played basketball and was a founding member of the Backyard Soccer League.

His debut book, The Withdrawal Method, a collection of short stories, won the Trillium Book Award and the Danuta Gleed Literary Award, as well as being shortlisted for the Commonwealth Prize and longlisted for the Scotiabank Giller Prize. One of his short stories, "Filmsong", won an Arthur Ellis Award while another was published on Joyland: A hub for short fiction.

Later that year, Snare Books released All Our Grandfathers Are Ghosts, a collection of poetry. His first novel, People Park, was published in 2012. His second novel, Fugue States, was published in 2017. Malla's third novel, Kill the Mall, was published in 2021 and was shortlisted for the 2022 Hamilton Literary Awards. Malla is an infrequent contributor to The Walrus.

Malla is currently an associate professor in the English Department at York University, where he teaches Creative Writing.

== Books ==
- 2008: The Withdrawal Method, House of Anansi, ISBN 978-0-88784-215-3
- 2008: All Our Grandfathers Are Ghosts, Snare Books, ISBN 978-0-9739438-8-7
- 2012: People Park
- 2015: Erratic Fire, Erratic Passion: The poetry of sportstalk, Featherproof Books ISBN 978-1-94388-803-0
- 2018: Fugue States, Vintage Canada ISBN 978-0-34581-134-9
- 2020: Kill the Mall
