= David Joy (author) =

American novelist

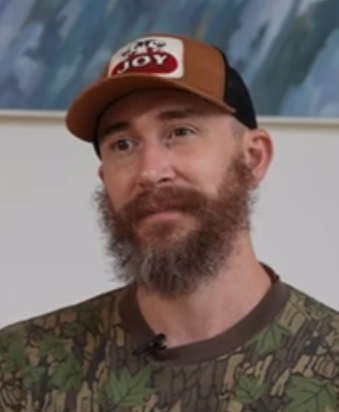
- In a 2024 interview
- Born: December 11, 1983 (age 42); Charlotte, North Carolina, U.S.
- Education: Western Carolina University (BA)
- Occupation: Novelist
- Writing career
- Notable work: Where All Light Tends to Go
- Notable awards: Edgar Award Finalist
- Website: david-joy.com

Signature
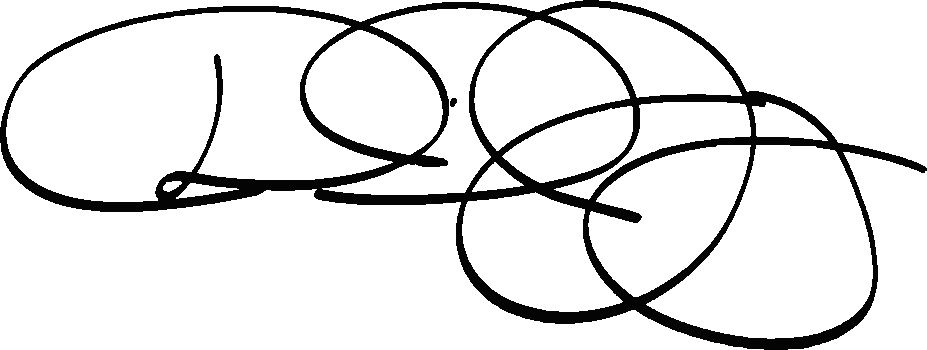

David Joy (born December 11, 1983) is an American fiction writer widely known for his short stories and novels exploring themes of nature, addiction, and the human condition – inspired by North Carolina, his home state. Plateau Magazine described Joy as a master at "creating a sense of place."

His writing has been featured in periodicals including Garden & Gun, Time, and The New York Times Magazine.

Raised in Moore's Chapel, North Carolina, near Charlotte, Joy graduated from Western Carolina University where he studied with poet and fiction writer, Ron Rash. He lives in the Little Canada community of Jackson County, North Carolina.

== Career ==
David Joy authored the Edgar Award–nominated novel Where All Light Tends to Go (G. P. Putnam's Sons, 2015), as well as the novels The Weight of This World (G. P. Putnam's Sons, 2017), The Line That Held Us (G. P. Putnam's Sons, 2018), and When These Mountains Burn (G. P. Putnam's Sons, 2020).

He is also the author of the memoir Growing Gills: A Fly Fisherman's Journey (Bright Mountain Books, 2011), which was a finalist for the Reed Environmental Writing Award and the Ragan Old North State Award. Joy received an artist fellowship from the North Carolina Arts Council.

His novel Where All Light Tends to Go has been optioned for a film directed by Ben Young and starring Billy Bob Thornton and Robin Wright. The film was released to streaming in 2023, as Devil's Peak.

== List of works ==
=== Novels ===
- Where All Light Tends to Go (G. P. Putnam's Sons, 2015)
- The Weight of This World (G. P. Putnam's Sons, 2017)
- The Line That Held Us (G. P. Putnam's Sons, 2018)
- When These Mountains Burn (G. P. Putnam's Sons, 2020)
- Those We Thought We Knew (G. P. Putnam's Sons, 2023)

=== Nonfiction ===
- Growing Gills: A Fly Fisherman's Journey (2011)
- . Eds. David Joy and Eric Rickstad (2019)

=== Short stories ===
- "The Stars Shall Withdraw Their Shining". Flycatcher, No. 3 (Summer/Fall 2013).
- "The Line That Held Us". Pisgah Review, 7.1 (Winter 2013): 26–34.
- "Burning off into Forever." Appalachia Now: Short Stories of Contemporary Appalachia. Eds. Larry Smith and Charles Dodd White. Huron, OH: Bottom Dog Press, 2015. 40–46.
- . Still: The Journal, Issue 18 (Spring 2015).
- "Stink Bait". Writer's Bone (March 10, 2016).

=== Essays ===
- "Tired and Feathered". Bird Watcher's Digest 31.2 (November/December 2008): 80–82.
- "Breaking in the Cork" at the Wayback Machine (archived October 12, 2016). Wilderness House Literary Review 4.1 (Spring 2009): 1–9.
- "Native". Smoky Mountain Living 9.4 (Summer 2009): 54–56.
- "Creatures of Fire". Smoky Mountain Living 10.3 (Summer 2010): 44–47.
- "Sound of Silence". Smoky Mountain Living 10.1 (Winter 2010): 42–45.
- "The Long Row" at the Wayback Machine (archived October 12, 2016). Drafthorse Literary Journal 1.2 (Summer 2012).
- "The Man Who Carried Snakes". The Good Men Project. August 15, 2015.
- "The Last Hotdog I Ever Ate". Charlotte Magazine (October 2015): 37–40.
- "One Place misUnderstood". Writer's Bone. June 21, 2016.
- "One Place misUnderstood". The Huffington Post (reprint). June 23, 2016.
- "My Privilege, Our Problem." Charlotte Magazine. September 22, 2016.
- "This Caravan Rolls On". The Quivering Pen. March 6, 2017.
- "On Darkness". Criminal Element. March 13, 2017.
- "Digging In The Trash". The Bitter Southerner. May 2, 2017.
- "A Charlotte Native Remembers Fish Camps". Charlotte Magazine (November 2017): 54–59.
- "Good Dog: Mutually Reclusive". Garden & Gun (December 2017/January 2018): 87–90.
- "At The Crossroads". The New York Times Magazine (April 8, 2018): 48–53.
- "Hunting Camp". Time (August 6, 2018).
- "Dreaming Of Monster Fish". Garden & Gun (June/July 2019): 114–121.
- "Boss Hen". Garden & Gun (October/November 2020): 106–109.
- "Light In The Dark". Garden & Gun (October/November 2021): 116–119.
- "Song of the Woods". Garden & Gun (June/July 2022): 128–133.

=== Translations ===
- . France: Sonatine Editions, 2016. (French; first edition)
- . France: Sonatine Editions, 2018. (French; first edition)
- . Germany: Polar Verlag, 2019. (German; first edition)
- Ojo Por Ojo. Spain: RBA Libros, 2020. (Spanish; first edition)
- Ce Lien Entre Nous. France: Sonatine Editions, 2020. (French; first edition)
- Nos Vies En Flammes. France: Sonatine Editions, 2022. (French; first edition)
- Queste Montagne Bruciano. Italy: Jimenez, 2022.(Italian, first edition)
- Montañas En Llamas. Spain: RBA Libros, 2022. (Spanish; first edition)
- Dove Tende La Luce. Italy: Jimenez, 2023.(Italian, first edition)

== Awards ==
- 2011 Roosevelt-Ashe Conservation Award Finalist
- 2012 Ragan Old North State Award Finalist
- 2012 Reed Environmental Writing Award Finalist
- 2015 SIBA Pat Conroy Book Award Finalist, The Lords of Discipline Thriller Prize
- 2015 Thomas Wolfe Memorial Literary Award Finalist
- 2016 Edgar Award Finalist for Best First Novel
- 2016 Macavity Awards Finalist for Best First Novel
- 2017 International Dublin Literary Award Longlist for Where All Light Tends To Go'
- 2017 Le Prix du Balai de Bronze for Là Où Les Lumières Se Perdent (Where All Light Tends To Go)
- 2018 WCSA Tillie Olsen Award for Creative Writing (The Weight Of This World)
- 2019 Southern Book Prize (The Line That Held Us)
- 2019 St. Francis College Literary Prize Finalist (The Line That Held Us)
- 2020 Dashiell Hammett Prize for Literary Excellence in Crime Writing (When These Mountains Burn)
- 2022 Prix Saint-Maur En Poche du Roman Étranger (Ce Lien Entre Nous)
- 2023 Thomas Wolfe Memorial Literary Award
- 2023 Willie Morris Award for Southern Fiction
- 2024 Sir Walter Raleigh Award for Fiction
