= Polar Vortex =

2020 novel by Shani Mootoo

- First edition
- Author: Shani Mootoo
- Language: English
- Published: 2020
- Publisher: Akashic Books
- Publication place: Canada
- Pages: 256
- ISBN: 978-1617759086

Polar Vortex is a 2020 novel by Canadian author Shani Mootoo.

This domestic drama deals with the complexities of modern love. A love triangle develops between Priya, Alexandra and Prakash.

The novel was shortlisted for the Giller Prize in 2020.
