= Catherine Robertson =

New Zealand novelist

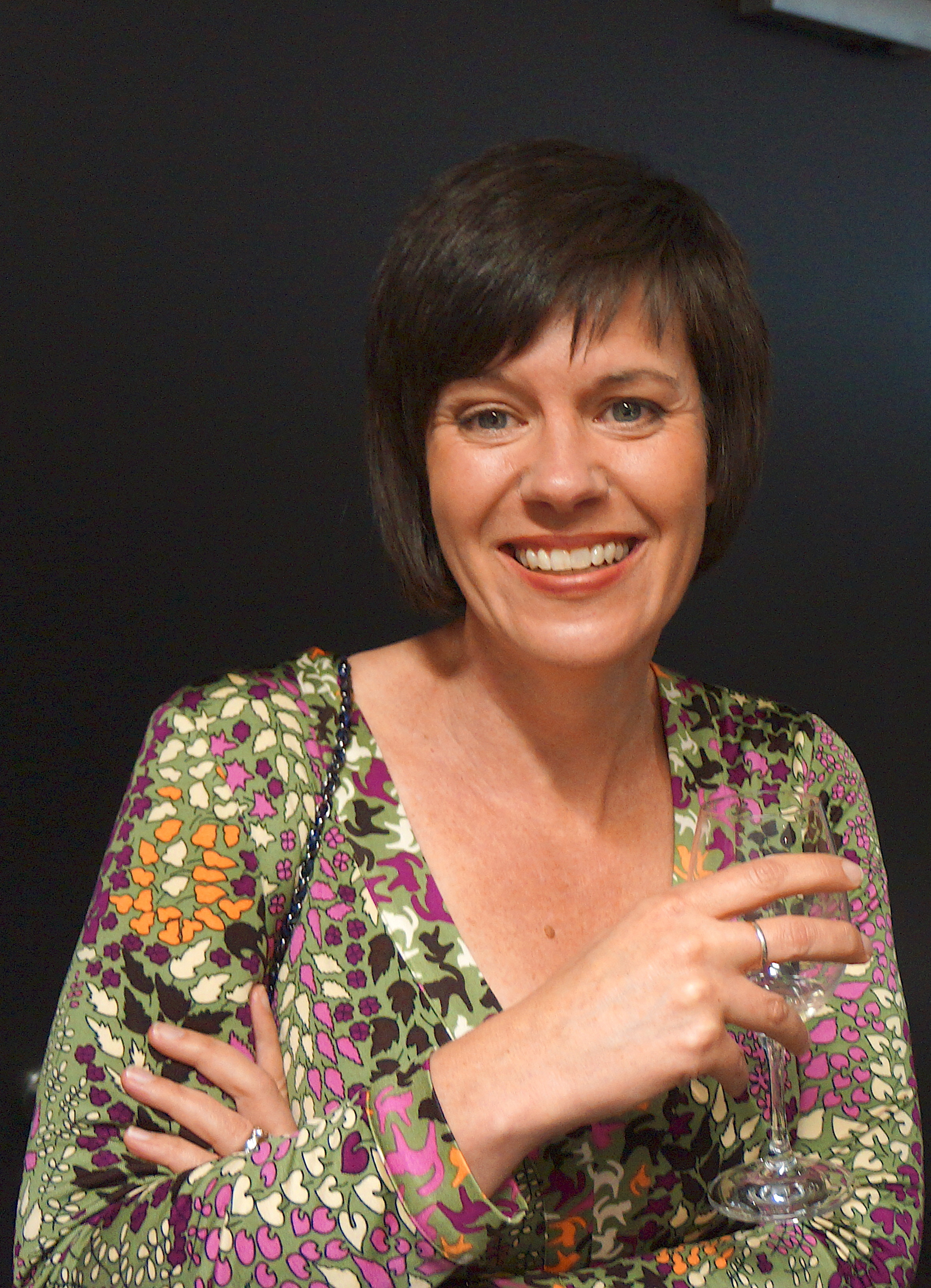
- At 2012 Frankfurt Book Fair
- Born: 1966 (age 59–60); Wellington
- Occupation: Writer
- Website: catherinejrobertson.com

Catherine Robertson is a New Zealand novelist, reviewer and broadcaster.

== Life ==
Catherine Robertson was born in Wellington in 1966. She grew up there and later lived in San Francisco and the United Kingdom. She has a Bachelor of Arts in English Literature from Victoria University of Wellington and has worked as a magazine feature writer, advertising copywriter and business consultancy owner.

While living in San Francisco, she took a creative writing course at a local community college, and in 2005, she took an Iowa short story course at the International Institute of Modern Letters (IIML) at Victoria University of Wellington. Over the following years she wrote her first novel and submitted it to UK agents; it was published in 2011.

Robertson was selected to represent New Zealand at the 2012 Frankfurt Book Fair.

In 2015 she completed a MA in creative writing at the IIML under supervisor Emily Perkins.

Her short fiction has appeared in HOME, Turbine and Sport, and some of her books have been published in Germany and Italy. Her books have been number one best sellers in New Zealand.

She reviews contemporary fiction for the NZ Listener, Booknotes Unbound and New Zealand Books and is a frequent guest on Radio New Zealand’s The Panel.

She has been invited to appear as speaker, panellist and/or chair at numerous literary festivals, including the New Zealand Book Council True Stories Told Live (2012), the IIML Writers on Monday series (2015), and, in 2018, the Auckland Writers Festival, Writers and Readers Week at the New Zealand Festival, WORD Christchurch, the NZSA National Writers Forum, the Hawke's Bay Arts Festival and LitCrawl Wellington, when she took part in a special live edition of RNZ's Short Story Club, hosted by Jesse Mulligan. She has served as Chair of the New Zealand Society of Authors Wellington branch and is a member of Romance Writers of New Zealand. She represents the New Zealand Society of Authors on the New Zealand Book Awards Trust.

She hosted the Book Council podcast Talking Books in 2015.

With Paula Morris, she co-authored a 2016 Book Council report into reader attitudes and why New Zealand adults weren't reading New Zealand fiction.

She is married with two adult sons, one of whom, Callum, is also a writer. She was co-owner of Good Books bookshop in Wellington, which closed in early 2024. She divides her time between Wellington and Hawke's Bay.

== Honours and awards ==
The Hiding Places won the Nelson Public Libraries Award for New Zealand Fiction (2015).

Robertson was Creative New Zealand/International Institute of Modern Letters Writer in Residence (2020).

== Bibliography ==
- The Hiding Places (Penguin Random House NZ, 2015)

The Imperfect Lives series:

- The Sweet Second Life of Darrell Kincaid (Random House, 2011; Heyne, Germany, 2012; Corbaccio, Italy, 2012)
- The Not So Perfect Life of Mo Lawrence (Random House, 2012; Heyne, Germany, 2012)
- The Misplaced Affections of Charlotte Fforbes (Random House NZ, 2013)
- The Midlife Misgivings of Edward Marsh (Imperfect Press, 2021)

Gabriel's Bay series

- Gabriel’s Bay (Penguin Random House NZ, 2018)
- What You Wish For (Penguin Random House NZ, 2019)
- Spellbound (Penguin Random House NZ, 2021)

Flora Valley series:

- Corkscrew You (HarperCollins, 2024)
- You're so Vine (One More Chapter, 2024)
- Kiss my Glass (One More Chapter, 2024)
