= The Girl in Room 105 =

Novel by Chetan Bhagat

- First edition
- Author: Chetan Bhagat
- Cover artist: Kashmira Irani
- Language: Indian English
- Genre: Mystery, Thriller
- Set in: India
- Publisher: Westland Books
- Publication date: October 9, 2018
- Publication place: India
- Media type: Paperback
- Pages: 304
- ISBN: 978-1542040464
- Followed by: One Arranged Murder

The Girl in Room 105 is the eighth novel and the tenth book overall written by the Indian author Chetan Bhagat. The book became a bestseller based on prearranged sales alone. It tells about a coaching class tutor who goes to wish his ex-girlfriend on her birthday and finds her murdered. The rest of the story is his journey where after her death he is determined to bring justice. The book also addresses several stereotypes and political issues in India.

The novel opens up with a conversation of the author of the book, Chetan Bhagat, with a fellow passenger on a midnight IndiGo flight from Hyderabad to Delhi. After an initial conversation, Chetan agrees to listen to the story of the fellow passenger. Soon after, the fellow passenger starts narrating his story to the author.

== Plot ==
Keshav Rajpurohit is an IIT graduate working as a trainer at a JEE tuition center. He hates his job and reaches out to various other companies, but fails to find a new job. He belongs to a traditional family; his mother is a homemaker and his father is a part of the RSS. His ex-girlfriend Zara Lone is a PHD candidate at IIT, but their relationship ended years ago due to their families fighting over religious issues - Zara is from a Kashmiri Muslim family, while Keshav's family is staunchly Hindu. While Zara moves on and eventually gets engaged to Raghu Venkatesh, Keshav's classmate at IIT, Keshav has never got over her, often getting drunk and calling Zara afterwards, begging to get back together. Saurabh, Keshav's best friend and roommate, bids Keshav to forget his past love and focus on his future.

On Zara's birthday, Keshav controls his urge to call her at midnight. He and Saurabh drink and watch TV, but at around 3 a.m., Keshav gets texts from Zara asking him why he didn't wish her this year. Zara goes on to tell him that she misses him, and to meet her immediately; Keshav complies and rushes (with Saurabh) to Zara's hostel room to wish her in person.

After sneaking in past security guards, Keshav finds the room dark and utterly silent. At first, he sees Zara in bed and believes she's asleep already, but upon coming closer, he notices dark handprints around her neck and no pulse, discovering that she is, in fact, dead. He immediately informs Saurabh, who implores that they flee the scene. Much to Saurabh's annoyance, Keshav is determined to find the killer. He informs the police, then Raghu - who is currently in hospital in Hyderabad after suffering injuries by being beaten up by local goons - and Zara's parents. The police ends up arresting the watchman of the hostel, who was missing from the CCTV camera footage during the time Zara must have been killed.

Although the police close the case afterwards, Keshav continues his investigation. He digs deeper with the help of police Inspector Vikas Rana, first suspecting Prof. Saxena, Zara's PhD guide, who had made passes at her, but quickly realising that he is not involved in her murder. Keshav tries to find Sikander, Zara's stepbrother, who happens to be part of a fundamentalist group called Tehreek in Kashmir. Keshav seeks help from Zara's father and, with Saurabh, searches her room for clues, finding a locker with gunpowder, drugs, expensive earrings, pregnancy tests, a burner phone, and a selfie of Zara with Sikander and a machine gun. Zara's father tells them about Tehreek, and they leave for Kashmir to try and meet Sikander for more information. Sikander threatens them with a gun and flees, but meets them again after they reach back out via his mother, and tries to explain that he is not the murderer. However, all of Keshav's clues lead him to believe that Sikander murdered his sister in fear of Tehreek being exposed, and he alerts local police to Sikander's location for an arrest the next day. Upon arrival, they discover that Sikander has committed suicide after leaving a video explaining that he did not kill his sister, but that his existence would harm Tehreek and that he loved his sister like a mother. After the suicide, Keshav realizes he made a mistake by doubting him.

Keshav then directs his attention to the pregnancy kits Zara had in her safe, and finds a picture of a Captain Faiz Khan, an army officer and Zara’s childhood friend, in Kashmir with her via her Instagram account. After proper investigation, he finds out that it was Faiz who gifted Zara the expensive earrings, and he raids his house in Delhi with Saurabh. Keshav and Saurabh discover gold bricks, more of the same pregnancy tests found in Zara's safe, and links to abortion clinics and divorce lawyers in his search history. This leads the two to believe that Faiz and Zara were having an affair, he got her pregnant, and killed her out of guilt.

Keshav and Saurabh let Zara's father know, who arranges a dinner party to commemorate 100 days since Zara's passing, where they will announce her murderer. While these plans are set, Keshav suddenly decides to take a trip to Hyderabad, where he checks the airport CCTV only to find a shrouded man travelling to Delhi during the hours prior to Zara's murder. Keshav realises Raghu is the murderer, and they apprehend him after the ceremony. He eventually gives in and recounts his motive - he killed her because he found out she was having an affair with Faiz and was pregnant with his child; Faiz tells, however, that she wasn't. While they did have an affair, it ended because Zara did not want Faiz to leave his wife and two children, and because she did love Raghu. Raghu also reveals that he paid some goons to injure him, so that he would have an alibi for when he could escape hospital to fly out to Delhi with a fake ID and strangle Zara in her sleep. It is also revealed to have been Raghu that sent Keshav text messages from Zara's phone on her birthday. Raghu is then arrested by Inspector Rana.

With the murderer caught, Keshav finally feels that he is over Zara and their relationship. He visits Zara's grave and says goodbye. Keshav and Saurabh open their own private investigation agency: Z Detectives.

== Sequel ==
The novel was followed by One Arranged Murder which was published on September 28, 2020.

A reference is also made in his new novel 400 days
