= I Can't Get You Out of My Mind =

Novel

First edition (publ. Book*hug)

I Can't Get You Out of My Mind is a 2020 novel by Canadian author Marianne Apostolides.

A writer and mother who used to have an affair with a married man decides to take part in a research study living together with an AI device.
