= Shani Mootoo =

Trinidadian-Canadian writer

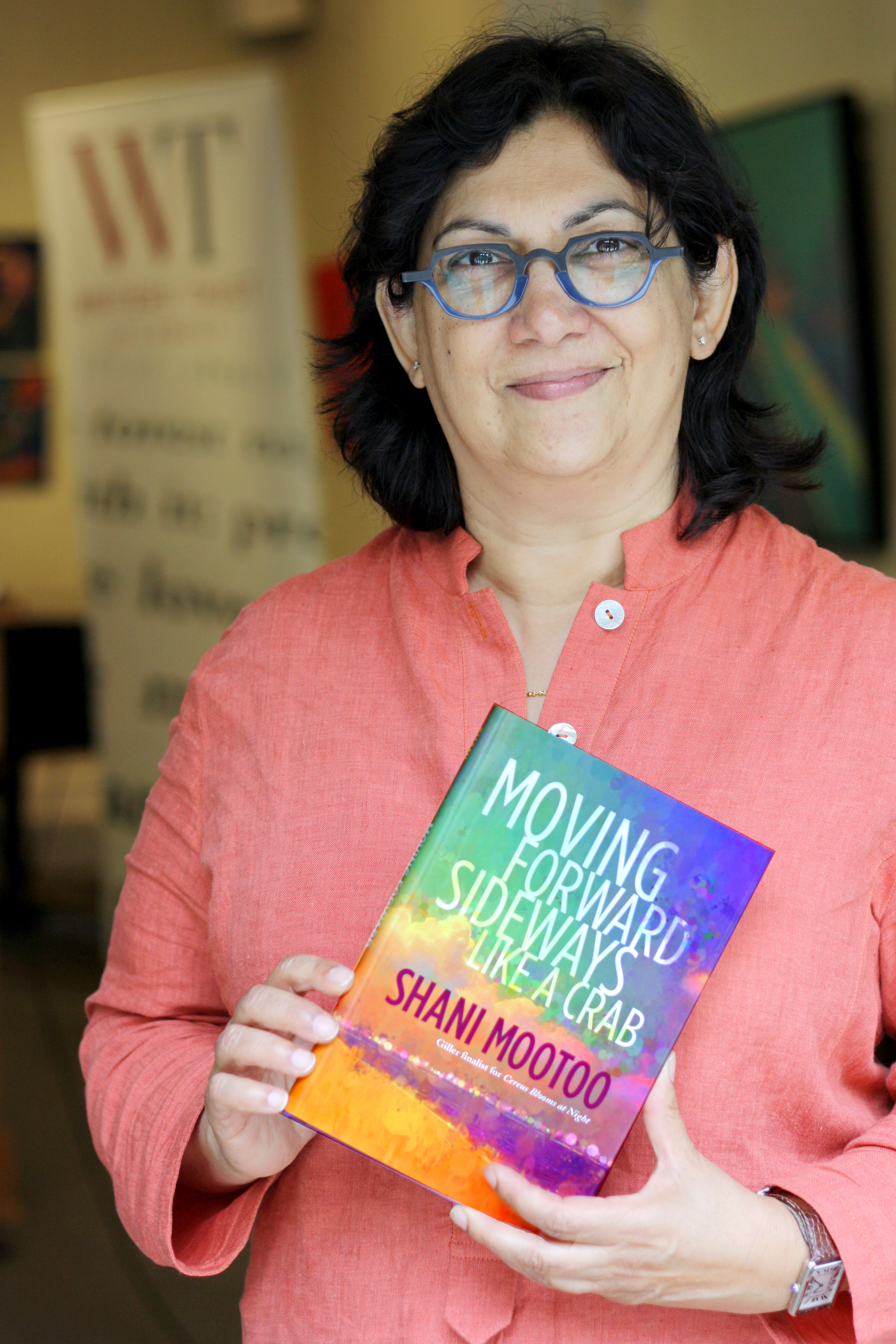
- Mootoo with her book, Moving Forward Sideways Like a Crab
- Born: Dublin, Ireland
- Education: University of Western Ontario (BA) University of Guelph (MA)
- Occupations: Novelist; Visual Artist; Filmmaker
- Writing career
- Language: English
- Website: www.shanimootoo.ca

Shani Mootoo is a Trinidadian-Canadian writer, visual artist and video maker. Her body of work, which explores gender and ethnic identity, alongside deep trauma, suffering, and the overcoming of it has received international acknowledgement.

== Early life and education ==
Shani Mootoo was born in Dublin, Ireland in 1957 to Trinidadian parents. Mootoo’s father, Ramesh Mootoo, was a medical family doctor and politician. Mootoo's mother, Indra Mootoo (née Samaroo), had grown ill after giving birth to her; Mootoo's maternal grandmother acted as her primary caretaker for the first five years of her life, raising her in Trinidad. Mootoo's parents retained custody of her upon their return to Trinidad. This abrupt separation from the life she had known before caused pressure on Mootoo to fit into a new environment and to gain the respect of her mother. Mootoo has expressed feeling like an outsider, stating that she, "was from the very beginning - starting in her own family that had grown without her being part of it for her first five years of life – on the outside. She saw that they were a close-knit family, and side-by-side with the trauma of the separation from her grandparents and being thrown in with these people who were strangers to her, she wanted, too, to be part of that closeness. It was perhaps the beginning of a pattern of lifelong contradictions related to the insider/outsider status". Mootoo's belief that she has always "felt like a migrant" stems from this childhood struggle.

Mootoo showed interest in wanting to be a painter from a young age, and discovered a passion for writing later on. Many of Mootoo's earliest poems described the love between two men or two women. While Mootoo's mother supported her daughter's painting aspirations, Mootoo's parents were upset by her poetry as they worried about the potential negative implications that writing about queerness could have for her future.

Mootoo has discussed her sexual abuse by a friend of her grandfather's. After her grandmother told her to "never say such words again" when Mootoo informed her, Mootoo began to fear that her words were getting her into trouble. This, coupled with the reaction from her parents about the themes she tackled in her writing, caused Mootoo to redirect her full attention to painting, feeling that it had more potential for ambiguity and equivocalness. Mootoo did not begin to grasp the abuse she had endured until her late twenties and found the support she received from others to factor into her decision to "use the most correct words, phrases, sentences, analogies, and stories" to communicate her trauma, the manifestation of it, and how it impacted the person she became. This realization inspired Mootoo to get back into writing. Mootoo has expressed insecurity about being a painter before being a writer, saying that she eventually came back to writing "accidentally".

Mootoo earned a Fine Arts BFA Degree at the University of Western Ontario in 1980, and an MA in English and Theatre from the University of Guelph, 2010. As a multimedia visual artist in Vancouver and New York City, where she lived from 1994 to 1999, she explored in her paintings, photographs and videos themes of gender, sexuality, and race. The themes of her work resonated with her experiences as an adolescent in Trinidad and as an immigrant adult in Canada. Her visual art and video work have traveled and been acclaimed internationally. She is now teaching the Creative Writing Program at the University of Toronto.

Mootoo cites Trinidad's "disregard for equal rights and justice" for her decision to reside in Canada.

== Career ==
=== Visual and video art ===
Mootoo's visual art and video work have been exhibited internationally, including at the New York Museum of Modern Art. On the topic of her visual work, she has said that as a victim of child abuse she found it safer to use pictures rather than words. Mootoo uses her art as a way to deal with the trauma of her childhood and has discussed feelings of confusion as to why the universe would let child abuse happen, while also claiming that as a survivor, she and all those that have suffered at the hands of abusers must come to terms with the trauma and understand what to do with suffering. Her film and video work was revisited by Rungh in its program Longing and Belonging: 1990s South Asian Film and Video, a featured program at the 2019 DOXA Documentary Film Festival. Mootoo reflected on her film and video work in the 1990s in the commissioned article "Streams Coming Together: 1990s video in Vancouver and beyond". Some of her other videos include; "English Lesson", "Wild Woman in The Woods", and "Her Sweetness Lingers". These videos have been screened in films, videos festivals, and art exhibitions both locally and internationally.

=== Writing and literary career ===
Mootoo's painting and writing have always informed one another; she became published when Persimmon Blackbridge took one of her paintings when writing to a publisher, where it was suggested that Mootoo write a novel or book of short stories.

Mootoo's first literary publication, Out on Main Street, a collection of short stories, was solicited by the Vancouver-based feminist publishing house Press Gang in 1993 and was the beginning of her literary career. The collection's title story centers a narrator who feels "ethnic inferiority" as a "watered-down Indian". She struggles with not being able to go out onto Main Vancouver's Main Street with her girlfriend because of issues with her identity, sexuality, and gender expression. It explores the realities of both forced conformity and attempts to fit nuanced humans into boxes, as well as analyzes the effects of homophobia, heterosexism, and notions of cultural authenticity.

Mootoo's first full-length novel, Cereus Blooms at Night, published by Press Gang in 1996, was shortlisted for the Scotia Bank Giller Prize in 1997, the Ethel Wilson Fiction Prize, and the Chapters Books in Canada First Novel Award. It has been published in 15 countries and won the New England Book Sellers Award in 1998. Set on a tropical island, the novel is narrated by a male nurse and caretaker, and explores trauma, madness and redemption, the legacies of sexual abuse, and the boundaries between heterosexual and homosexual desire. Mootoo has said that Cereus Bloom was her way of introducing herself to her readers.

In 2002, Mootoo followed her first novel with a collection of poetry, The Predicament of Or. The collection conveys "the language of longing", specifically, the want to live outside of binary oppositions. Other forms of longing that the collection explores include the home and the dichotomy of living and writing between languages. Mootoo's own multicultural background served as the basis for the collection.

Her second full-length novel, He Drown She in the Sea, was published in 2005. Taking place on the fictional Caribbean island of Guanagaspar both in World War II and in the present day, the story centers around Harry and Rose, two childhood friends who are divided by class hierarchy. Harry is banished from Rose's home, and the two reunite in Canada again years later, where they begin a "life-affirming affair". The novel tackles themes of social difference, desire, and daring to go against the life that one has been born into. It made the long list for the International Dublin Literary Award in 2007.

Her 2008 novel, Valmiki's Daughter, is set in San Fernando, Trinidad, and depicts a father and daughter who struggle to come to terms with secrets. Mootoo has said that the story is about a father trying to help his daughter from leading the same kind of closeted life that he has led. Viveka and her father's lives are each underpinned by the constraints of class and race, and most importantly by the sexual conventions of their society. Set against its strongly evoked backdrop of place, the novel charts Viveka's coming to terms with the hard understanding that love faces society's obstacles, and her knowledge of her certain survival. Valmiki's Daughter was long-listed for 2009's Scotiabank Giller Prize. In an interview, Mootoo explained her realization that she had written about food on almost every page of Valmiki's Daughter without realizing it. She discusses the importance of food and entertaining people in Trinidadian culture, as well as in her life and her other work.

Mootoo's two subsequent novels, Moving Forward Sideways like a Crab (2014) and Polar Vortex (2020), were also shortlisted for the Giller Prize. Moving Sideways Like a Crab was a finalist in the category "Transgender Fiction" for the 27th Annual Lambda Literary Awards. The novel follows the character Jonathan, a writer, as he looks for one of his parents, whom he has not seen since they divorced. Jonathan then finds out that this parent is now a transgender man. Mootoo read and spoke heavily with others to create this story of transition. Polar Vortex, Mootoo's follow-up, centers around Priya, a lesbian Indo-Trinidadian art historian who is visited by Prakash, an Indo-Ugandan man who is Priya's old college friend. Priya refuses to disclose information about Prakash to her wife, Alex, thus setting up the narrative's central conflict. The novel examines how a woman's desire to belong in a society full of racist and sexist manipulation results in alienation. Priya attempts to cement herself as an "appropriate" lesbian under Western parameters and does not receive unconditional acceptance from Alex or Prakash because they "cannot situate Priya in her context".

Mootoo wrote two volumes of poetry, Cane Fire and Oh Witness Dey!, in 2022 and 2024, respectively. The former follows a narrator moving from Ireland to San Fernando, while the latter serves as a tribute to indentured Indian ancestors and their descendants.

Mootoo's most recent novel, Starry Starry Night was released on September 23, 2025. A work of autofiction, the story follows the life of Anju, a young Trinidadian girl. Through her eyes, readers see the familial strife she experiences, as well as get glimpses of supporters of Trinidadian independence. Mootoo based Starry Starry Night heavily on her own childhood, and had begun jotting down ideas that she would implement in the book almost forty years prior to its publication. She had written personal, raw, unfiltered thoughts about her life, which Mootoo's friend had passed along to a publisher's office, who gave her an offer. Mootoo declined, believing that the material she had written was too personal and lacking in polish, calling it "pre-writing". Mootoo began to recognize the richness of her youth and became drawn to her old material. She cites the death of both her parents as a reason why she decided to go back to working on the material, stating that she did not want them to know the scars they had left on her while they were alive.

Mootoo's novels are found on course lists in the Departments of English, Liberal Arts, Women's Studies, and Cultural Studies at universities in the Caribbean, Canada, the United States, England, Europe, India, and Australia. Her literary papers are held at Simon Fraser University Special Collections and Rare Books. The collection contains "printed typescripts of published works with drafts and related working papers, published reviews, drafts of unpublished works, lecture notes, professional correspondence, notebooks and sketchbooks, video productions in VHS format, audio materials and works of visual art".

In 2022, the Writers' Trust of Canada awarded Mootoo its Writers' Trust Engel/Findley Award for her body of work.

=== Other projects ===
Mootoo has served as writer in residence at the University of Alberta, the University of Guelph and the University of the West Indies, and as a visiting scholar at Mills College in California, US. She frequently speaks and reads internationally. In 2008, the University of the West Indies, Cave Hill, Barbados, hosted a Symposium on the Fictions of Shani Mootoo in the Context of Caribbean Women's Writings. Mootoo is a part of the Associated Graduate Faculty at the University of Guelph, supporting the Creative Writing Program in the School of English and Theatre Studies.

In 2009, she served on the jury for the Dayne Ogilvie Prize, a literary award for emerging LGBT writers in Canada, selecting Debra Anderson as that year's prize winner.

As an activist, Mootoo has taken part of various social causes and is committed to speaking out against various injustices; she has stated that this outweighs any desire she has to experience social inclusion. Mootoo has spoken out against child abuse. In 1989 she addressed Sex Offenders at Stave Lake Correctional Centre about being a survivor of child abuse and suffering.

== Personal life ==
Mootoo enjoys biking and hiking. She currently holds the position of Associated Graduate Faculty at the University of Guelph in support of the Creative Writing program in the School of English and Theatre Studies.

== Videos written, directed and filmed by Mootoo ==
Year	Title	Duration	Notes
1989	Lest I Burn	8 minutes	
1990	English Lesson	5 minutes	
1992	A Paddle and a Compass	8 minutes	With Wendy Oberlander
1992	The Wild Woman in the Woods	12 minutes	
1998	Her Sweetness Lingers	18 minutes	
1999	Guerita and Prietita	23 minutes	With Kath High
2000	View	8 minutes	
2010	And the Rest is Drag	32 minutes	

== Selected anthologies ==
Year	Title	Editors	Publishing House
2006	Writing Life, Celebrated Canadian and International Authors on Writing and Life	Constance Rooke	McClelland and Stewart Publishers
2008	Our Caribbean	Thomas Glave	Duke University Press
2008	Trinidad Noir	Lisa Agostini and Jeanne Mason	Akashic Press, NYC
2015	Caribbean Ghost Stories	Martin Munroe	UWI Press
2016	Trinidad Noir: The Classics	Earl Lovelace and Robert Antoni	Akashic Press, NYC
2019	Global Anglophone Indian Poems, Poetry July/August 2019		Poetry Magazine, Poetry Foundation USA
2019	The Penguin Book of Migration Literature		Penguin Classics, Penguin Book

== Selected visual art exhibitions and video screenings ==
- The Museum of Modern Art, New York City, New York, USA, 1994, 1995
- Museum of Modern Art, Transing the Grain, NYC, New York, USA, 1995
- Queens Museum, New York, USA, 1995
- Transculture, The Venice Biennale, Venice, Italy, 1995
- Topographies, The Vancouver Art Gallery, B.C. 1998
- Portraits of Re-semblance, Works by Peter Hoffer and Shani Mootoo, Oeno Gallery, Bloomfield, ON, 2020
- QAF/VIVO, Screening of View, Sum Gallery, Vancouver, British Columbia, 2020
- Salon 44 (group photography exhibition) Gallery 44, Toronto, 2020
- Where We Have Been, Group show, Surrey Art Gallery, British Columbia, 2020
- Negotiating Diaspora: From the Personal to the Universal, Oeno Gallery, Bloomfield ON, 2021
- The Narrative of Objects, Oeno Gallery, Bloomfield, ON, 2023
- Out of India: contempary of the South Asian diaspora, Queens Museum of Art, New York, 1997

== Bibliography ==
=== Full-length novels ===
Year	Title	Publishing House	Notes
1996	Cereus Blooms at Night	Press Gang Publishers, Canada	Shortlisted for the Scotiabank Giller Prize, The Chapters First Novel Award, The Ethel Wilson Book Prize Longlisted for the Man Booker Prize
2005	He Drown She in the Sea	Raincoast/Polestar Publishers, Canada	Longlisted for the Dublin IMPAC Award
2008	Valmiki's Daughter	House of Anansi Press, Canada	Longlisted for the Scotia Bank Giller Prize
2014	Moving Forward Sideways like a Crab	Doubleday, Canada	Shortlisted for the Lambda Award Longlisted for the Scotia Bank Giller Prize
2020	Polar Vortex	Book*hug Press, Canada	Shortlisted for the Scotia Bank Giller Prize
2025	Starry, Starry Night	Book*hug Press, Canada	

=== Poetry collections ===
Year	Title	Publishing House	Notes
1993	Out on Main Street	Press Gang Publishers, Canada	Short Story Collection
2002	The Predicament of Or	Raincoast/Polestar Publishers, Canada	Poetry Collection
2020	Initiate, a Poem	Book*hug Press, Canada	Poetry
2022	Cane Fire	Book*hug Press, Canada	Poetry Collection
2024	Oh Witness Dey!	Book*hug Press, Canada	Poetry Collection

== Archives and collections ==
- Papers archived at the Bennett Library, Simon Fraser University, British Columbia, Canada
- Visual arts and videos in various private collections, including the collection of the National Gallery and the Surrey Art Gallery
- AWARE, Archives of Women Artists, Research and Exhibitions, France

== Awards and accolades ==
Year	Award	Ref
1992-2013	Canada Council for the Arts for Writing, Visual Arts, and Film and Video	
2012	K.M. Hunter Artist Award for Literature	
2012	Ontario Arts Council, Writing and Publishing	
2016	Chalmers Fellowship	
2017	Jim Duggins Outstanding Mid-Career Novelists' Prize	
2022	Writers' Trust Engel/Findley Award	
2026	Blue Metropolis Violet Prize	
