= Christopher Bollen =

American writer (born 1975)

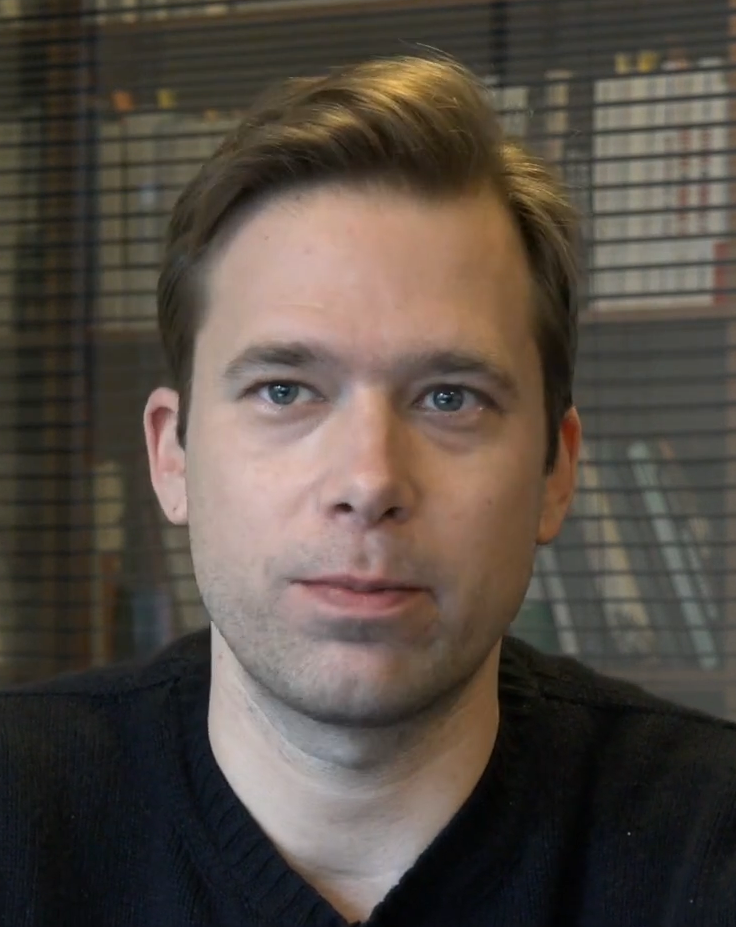
- Bollen in 2016
- Born: November 26, 1975 (age 50); Cincinnati, Ohio, US
- Education: Columbia University (BA)
- Occupations: Novelist, editor

Christopher Bollen (born November 26, 1975) is an American novelist and magazine writer/editor who lives in New York City.

Describing his novels, The Daily Telegraph notes that "Bollen writes expansive, psychologically probing novels in the manner of Updike, Eugenides and Franzen, but he is also an avowed disciple of Agatha Christie."

== Early life ==
Bollen grew up in Cincinnati, where he graduated from St. Xavier High School in 1994. He graduated Phi Beta Kappa from Columbia University in 1998.

== Career ==
Bollen was the editor-in-chief of Interview from early 2008 to mid-2009, after serving as editor-in-chief of V. After stepping down as editor-in-chief, he continued on as editor-at-large of Interview.

Bollen also writes about art and culture at other publications like Artforum and The New York Times.

=== Novels ===
Bollen published his first novel, Lightning People, in 2011. Lightning People is about downtown New York City in 2007.

His second novel is titled Orient, a thriller published in May 2015 by HarperCollins named after Orient, New York (the tip of the North Fork of Long Island). The Los Angeles Times writes that Orient "might well be this summer's most ambitious thriller or this summer's most thrilling work of literary fiction." The Times further describes it as a "juicy mystery at the tip of Long Island at summer's end, when the season's fleeting pleasures have blown away, revealing the fractured and fractious year-round community that remains behind when the casual visitors have returned to the relative safety of New York City."

Bollen's third novel, The Destroyers, was published on June 27, 2017, by HarperCollins. It is set on the island of Patmos, Greece, where the Book of Revelation was thought to be written and was describing by The New York Times as "evoking a seductive mood of longing mixed with regret." It was honoured with The Fitzgerald Award in France. His fourth novel, A Beautiful Crime, was published in January 2020 by HarperCollins. The novel deals with two young gay men involved in a heist in contemporary Venice, Italy. It was a Best Book of the year 2020 by Oprah Magazine. The novel went on to be a finalist for the 2020 Los Angeles Times Book Prize.

Bollen's short story "SWAJ", a queer retelling of Peter Benchley's Jaws published in the Brooklyn Rail, was selected for inclusion in 2021's The Best American Mystery and Suspense.

Bollen's fifth novel, The Lost Americans, was published in March 2023 by HarperCollins. Set in Cairo, it deals with the mysterious death of a weapons defense contractor and his sister's attempt to solve the mystery of his murder. Bollen's portrayal of a gay Egyptian character during the current political climate received particular praise. New York Times called it "sobering, shocking," "gripping and genuinely moving. The novel was a finalist for the 2024 Joseph Hansen Award for LGBTQ Crime Writing.

Bollen was a jurist for the 2023 PEN/Faulker Award for Fiction, won by Yiyun Li

Bollen's sixth novel, Havoc, was published in December 2024 HarperCollins. It revolves around the deteriorating sanity of an 81-year-old American widow in a hotel in Luxor, Egypt during the end of the pandemic. She develops an acrimonious relationship with an 8-year-old boy that leads to murder. Havoc was a best thriller of 2024 by the New York Times. The novel was a finalist for the 2025 Los Angeles Times Book Prize and won the Ohioana Library's Ohio Book Award for fiction.
