= Cereus Blooms at Night =

1996 novel by Shani Mootoo

Cereus Blooms at Night (1996) is the first novel published by film-maker, artist, and writer Shani Mootoo. The novel recounts the story of an old lady named Mala Ramchandin through the narrative of Tyler, a nurse at Paradise Alms House. Although the setting of the novel (the town of Paradise in the country Lantanacamara) is deliberately left ambiguous, it is thought to be patterned after the island of Trinidad, where Mootoo lived as a child.

== Plot ==
At the beginning of Part I, Tyler addresses the general audience. His intention for telling the story of Mala is in hopes that the book will eventually reach Asha Ramchandin, Mala's long-lost younger sister. Mala is an aging, notoriously crazy woman suspected of murder. She was ordered to Paradise Alms House after the judge found her unfit to stand trial.

Part I opens with Mala arriving to Paradise Alms House. She is heavily sedated and kept under physical constraint. All of the nurses are afraid to attend to her because she is rumored to be a murderer. Tyler, being the only male nurse in the nursing home and a subject of gossip and scrutiny for his alternative sexuality, is immediately drawn to her. He cares for her and slowly gains her trust. The first sounds that Mala makes are perfect imitations of crickets, frogs, and species of birds. However, she does not speak.

Then Tyler begins to tell the story he heard from his Cigarette Smoking Nana about Mala's father, Chandin Ramchandin. Chandin's father was an indentured field laborer from India. At an early age, Chandin became the adopted son of Reverend Thoroughly, a white man, in exchange for his parents’ conversion to Christianity. The Reverend also wanted to adopt an Indian child in hope to have closer connection with the Indians in Paradise. Growing up, Chandin found himself madly in love with Lavinia, the daughter of the Reverend and, therefore, his "sister." Attractive and beautiful, Lavinia brushed off all attention from boys and remained in the company of one girlfriend, Sarah, who happened to be Indian and the only other girl in the seminary school. When Chandin grew into a fine young man, he decided to confess his love to Lavinia. Lavinia firmly rejected his love and announced that she would be leaving for the Shivering Northern Wetlands in three days. Later, Chandin had heard the news that Lavinia was engaged to her distant cousin in Wetlands. Heartbroken yet trying to conceal his feelings, Chandin announced that he was in love with Sarah and wanted to marry her.

Chandin traveled around paradise with the Reverend, spreading the gospel and encouraging more conversions to Christianity. Sarah gave birth to two daughters, Pohpoh (Mala) and Asha. In the meantime, Lavinia had returned to Paradise with the news that she had broken off her engagement. Lavinia visited Sarah often and one day, Pohpoh caught Lavinia and Sarah in a moment of intimacy. Eventually Chandin also noticed the unusual affection between his wife and Lavinia. He confronted Sarah and announced that he knew about her affair with Lavinia. In hopes of being with each other, Lavinia and Sarah decided to elope together with the children. However Chandin unexpectedly returned home early on the day of the planned escape. In the mist of confusion and screaming, Pohpoh and Asha were left behind with their enraged and demented father.

After the news spread of his wife leaving her with another woman, Chandin gave up his religion, his God, and began to drink heavily. Then one night, he raped Pohpoh, his eldest daughter. Every night he would call one of his daughters into bed with him. During the day, the children went to school like other children but, at night, they lived under the sexual tyranny of their father. Pohpoh had a childhood admirer and friend, whom she called her Boyie. One day, she seduced him in his mother's house but stopped right before sexual intercourse. Back in the nursing home, Mala begins to have visitors, Otoh and his father Ambrose Mohanty. Ambrose was Mala's Boyie.

Part II of the novel further traces the development of the relationship between Mala and Otoh, a plot line that interweaves with one of Mala's memories of Pohpoh. In the memory, Pohpoh sneaks out of her father's home, enters another house, and returns safely, all the while being “protected” by the adult Mala. The memory is rich in detail about the nature that Pohpoh feels, smells, and hears, since the entire time she is covered in darkness.

At the same time that Mala is reflecting on her quite vivid recollections of Pohpoh, Otoh begins to work up the courage to come see her. His father Ambrose had taken up an almost constant sleep and only awoke once a month to prepare provisions (a source of contention with his wife), which Otoh would then deliver to Mala. During one such delivery, Otoh dared to enter the Mala's yard dressed in his father's old clothes. Mistaking him for Ambrose, Mala dances with him and then takes him inside to show him the long-decaying body of her father. Terrified, he ran away and collapsed on the street outside. When he recounted what he had seen, the police came into Mala's house and investigated. Upon discovery of the body, they arrested her and prepared her for a court visit. However, before the police had a chance to retrieve the body from Mala's house, Otoh decided to make the rather decisive move (especially in comparison to his father) of burning down Mala's house.

Parts III, IV, and V of the novel are all significantly shorter than the first two sections. Part III provides a flashback to the budding romance between Ambrose and Mala after he returned from studying in the Shivering Northern Wetlands, culminating in their act of making love. Unfortunately, it is that same day that Chandin realizes his daughter's affair and, as a result, abuses and rapes her severely. The next day, when Ambrose returns, there is a confrontation between all three. Ambrose runs away during the conflict, leaving Mala to lock her father's unconscious body in a room downstairs. Part IV of the novel includes the discovery that Ambrose's wife has left him and an explanation by Ambrose to Otoh that murdering her father had driven Mala mad. She attacked Ambrose anytime he tried to visit. Part V provides a sense of resolution to the novel with the discovery of several letters sent from Asha to Mala that were never delivered and the subsequent attempt by Tyler to contact Asha through this book.

== Themes ==
Imaginary space: Lantanacamara is an alternative social image. It is not tied down by real geographies or maps. Furthermore, it is not limited to the spaces named by colonial rules and mapped by Colonial cartographers. This paradise known as Lantanacamara is not a known space understood from an African Safari perspective nor conformed to any colonizer's epistemic norms.

Identity: The individual assertion of one's autonomy over social norms can be illustrated through Asha Ramchandin, who is strong enough to leave home and search for a new life. Tyler himself in the end openly expressed his affection with Otoh in front of the judgmental crowd of nurses.

Diaspora: The book is filled with flash backs and with Mala's story being told in a first person narrative by Tyler, whom himself is struggling with his gender identity that mirror the transformation that Mala undergoes in reclaiming her self-image. The story is broken by time of present and past, just like a person in diaspora are torn between their present home and past home.

Secrets: Every character in the book has a skeleton in their closets: Mala's abusive and secretive childhood, Chandin's secret passion for Lavinia, Sarah and Lavinia's love affair, the mysterious disappearance of Chandin, Otoh's 'unnoticed' sex transformation, and Tyler's gender identity.
