= One Arranged Murder =

Novel by Chetan Bhagat

- First edition
- Author: Chetan Bhagat
- Language: Indian English
- Genre: Mystery, thriller
- Set in: India
- Publisher: Westland
- Publication date: 28 September 2020
- Publication place: India
- Media type: Paperback
- Pages: 312
- ISBN: 978-1542094139
- Preceded by: The Girl in Room 105
- Followed by: 400 Days

One Arranged Murder is the ninth novel and the twelfth book overall written by the Indian author Chetan Bhagat. The novel is the sequel to Bhagat's 2018 novel The Girl in Room 105. A sequel to the book named 400 Days was released in 2021

== Plot ==
Keshav Rajpurohit and Saurabh Maheshwari are best friends working at Cybersafe. They also have a detective agency "Z Detectives" which they started after the events of The Girl in Room 105.

They get into a big quarrel as Saurabh is about to get engaged to budding entrepreneur Prerna Malhotra, tension starts to rise as the difference of opinion in Keshav and Saurabh. Saurabh is engaged to Prerna Malhotra and is set to get married in 3 months. Prerna fasts on Karva Chauth for Saurabh.

But as she waits for him to come to the terrace she falls to her death. Keshav and Saurabh take up the case and find the killer.

Prerna's cousin from USA, Anjali, is revealed to be the killer. Anjali is arrested.
