= Maria Mutch =

Canadian writer

- Born: Halifax, Nova Scotia, Canada
- Education: York University
- Occupations: memoirist, short stories
- Writing career
- Period: 2000s–present
- Notable work: Know the Night: A Memoir of Survival in the Small Hours

Maria Mutch is a Canadian writer, whose memoir Know the Night: A Memoir of Survival in the Small Hours was a shortlisted nominee for the Governor General's Award for English-language non-fiction at the 2014 Governor General's Awards.

Originally from Kentville, Nova Scotia, Mutch was educated at York University. She published Know the Night as a memoir of her experience as the mother of a son with autism.

Mutch currently lives in Rhode Island. She has also published essays and short fiction in both Canadian and American literary magazines. Her first novel, Molly Falls to Earth, was published in 2020.
