= Orient (novel) =

2015 novel by Christopher Bollen

- Author: Christopher Bollen
- Language: English
- Genre: Mystery fiction
- Publisher: HarperCollins
- Publication date: May 5, 2015
- Publication place: United States
- Pages: 624
- ISBN: 978-0-06-232995-0

Orient is a 2015 mystery novel by Christopher Bollen. It is Bollen's second novel, following Lightning People (2011). It was first published in the United States by Harper on May 5, 2015. The novel is about a series of mysterious events, including several murders, that take place in Orient Point, an affluent town in Long Island.

== Reception ==
Critical reception was mixed. The book received a starred review from Kirkus Reviews, which described it as a "nicely paced tale" and favorably compared it to the works of Patricia Highsmith. Ivy Pochoda of the Los Angeles Times praised Bollen's shifts in perspective, as well as his depiction of the Orient Point community and its residents. Charles Finch wrote a "very gently negative review" of the novel for the Chicago Tribune, feeling that it was too long and that the plot moved too slowly.
