= Clifford Jackman =

Canadian lawyer and writer

- Born: Deep River, Ontario, Canada
- Occupation: Writer
- Writing career
- Genres: Novelist, short stories
- Notable work: The Winter Family

Clifford Jackman is a Canadian lawyer and writer. He is best known for his 2015 novel The Winter Family, which was a longlisted nominee for the Scotiabank Giller Prize and a shortlisted nominee for the Governor General's Award for English-language fiction.

Born in Deep River, Ontario, Canada and raised in Ottawa, Jackman studied English literature at York University and law at Osgoode Hall Law School. He was called to the Bar of Ontario in 2009, and practices law in Guelph, Ontario.

Prior to The Winter Family, Jackman published two volumes of short stories and a mystery novel with Manor House Publishing. The Winter Family was his first book to be published by Random House of Canada.

== Works ==
- Deeper
- Jackman's Cliff
- The Black Box
- The Winter Family (2015)
- The Braver Thing (2020)
