= The Ickabog =

2020 fairy tale by J. K. Rowling

- Author: J. K. Rowling
- Language: English
- Genre: Fairy tale, children's book
- Publisher: Scholastic
- Publication date: 10 November 2020
- Publication place: United Kingdom
- ISBN: 978-1-338-73287-0
- OCLC: 1201528056

The Ickabog is a fairy tale by J. K. Rowling. The story was published in installments by Rowling online, before its official publication in November 2020. The Ickabog is Rowling's first children's book since Harry Potter and the Deathly Hallows was published in 2007. Upon release the book received generally positive critical reviews and emerged a bestseller.

== Background and release ==
The Ickabog is aimed at children between the ages of seven and nine. It is the first children's book written by J. K. Rowling that is not set in the Harry Potter universe, and at its announcement, Rowling confirmed that The Ickabog would not be a Harry Potter spin-off. Rowling has described the book as a "political fairytale ... for slightly younger children". Rowling first drafted The Ickabog between 2003 and 2007, as a gift for her children. She intended to publish The Ickabog after the Harry Potter series, but stopped after focusing on adult fiction instead. She left her script of The Ickabog in her attic until 2020. Rowling says that she went to her 50th birthday party wearing a dress containing the "lost manuscript" of The Ickabog. Rowling has made some adjustments to her original manuscript after feedback from her children.

Rowling announced that she would release the book online in 3 free online daily installments between 26 May and 10 July 2020. Rowling said, "I’ve decided to publish The Ickabog for free online, so children on lockdown, or even those back at school during these strange, unsettling times, can read it or have it read to them." The first two chapters were released on 26 May 2020. Later, chapters three to five were published on 27 May 2020. The final chapter, 6, was published on 10 July 2020. In the first 24 hours, The Ickabog website had more than 5 million views from 50 countries.

The Ickabog was released as a published book, e-book and audiobook on 10 November 2020, and is no longer available for free reading online. Rowling has said that she will donate her royalties from the book to charity.

== Setting ==
The Ickabog is set in the mythical land of Cornucopia, which is ruled by King Fred the Fearless. However, the peace of the kingdom is threatened by the existence of a terrifying monster known as the Ickabog. This creature is said to inhabit the treacherous marshes of the North and is believed to prey on unsuspecting sheep and people who venture into its territory. The Ickabog's legend is used to scare children into obedience and explain the disappearance of those who dare to explore the marshes.

Cornucopia is a land divided into two regions, with the South being a prosperous area that boasts several cities specializing in different types of food. Chouxville is famous for its delectable pastries, while Kurdsburg is renowned for its mouth-watering cheeses. Baronstown specializes in succulent meats, and Jeroboam is celebrated for its fine wine. Each city has its unique cuisine, and the people of Cornucopia take great pride in their culinary creations.

In contrast, the Marshlands are a less wealthy area located in the North of Cornucopia. The Marshlands are a desolate and dangerous place where the Ickabog is said to roam free. The people who live there are often forgotten by the rulers of the kingdom, and they struggle to survive in a harsh and unforgiving environment. The story of "The Ickabog" is a tale of adventure, courage, and the power of unity in the face of adversity. The people of Cornucopia must come together to overcome the challenges they face and protect their kingdom from the threat of the Ickabog.

== Plot ==
On the eve of a visit from the king of a neighboring country, Dora Dovetail dies of overwork while trying to finish King Fred's latest costume. Fred, despite feeling embarrassed and guilty, declines to visit her family, leading them to become disillusioned with him, especially Dora's daughter, Daisy. This leads to a fight between Daisy and her friend Bert Beamish, Major Beamish's son, when Daisy insults Fred.

A shepherd from the Marshlands begs Fred to rid the country of the Ickabog, and Fred, wishing to prove himself, agrees and rides north. An accident in the marshes results in Beamish getting fatally shot by Flapoon, one of Fred's corrupt advisors. Seeking to take control of the kingdom and become richer, Spittleworth, Flapoon's ally, pretends that Beamish was killed by the Ickabog.

On their return, three soldiers and Herringbone, the Chief Advisor, object to the story. Herringbone is murdered and the three soldiers are imprisoned. A heavy tax is imposed to pay for an "Ickabog Defense Brigade", causing widespread poverty, which Fred is oblivious to. Spittleworth, now Chief Advisor, has the Dovetails kidnapped, with Dan Dovetail sent to prison, and forced to carve Ickabog feet. Daisy ends up in the brutal Ma Grunter's orphanage, where she befriends Martha, a Marshlander.

Years pass, with the tax doubling. Bert and his mother Bertha, the king's head pastry chef, guess Spittleworth's plot after Bert discovers an Ickabog foot made by the now insane Dan. Bertha attempts to reveal the plot to Fred but is imprisoned in the dungeons. Bert escapes the city as Major Roach leads soldiers to arrest him. Bert later meets Roderick Roach, Major Roach's son, who tells him that Spittleworth killed his father and imprisoned his family. The two are captured by Basher John, Ma Grunter's henchman, and taken to the orphanage, where Bert reunites with Daisy and meets Martha. Meanwhile, Bertha transforms the dungeon into a kitchen with the help of the prisoners, while helping Dan regain his sanity.

The children escape the orphanage and hike to the Marshlands. They plan to sway the soldiers of the Ickabog Defense Brigade but realize that it has gone south for the winter. Succumbing to the cold, they fall unconscious, and the real Ickabog carries them to its cave. They speak to it, and the Ickabog reveals that from it a batch of Ickabogs will be "Bornded". As the feelings experienced by the dying parent Ickabog influence its newborn brood, the Ickabog plans to eat the four during the Bornding, so that its children will become man-eaters, to take revenge on the humans, who have caused the near-extinction of the Ickabog race.

Daisy persuades the Ickabog not to eat them, but to reveal itself to the people and befriend them. The group goes to Jeroboam, with the Ickabog handing out flowers. The citizens rally around the Ickabog, and they march on Chouxville. Basher John is alerted to the march and rides to warn Spittleworth, who refuses to believe him and has him arrested. Spittleworth prepares to investigate with Flapoon, but they are confronted by the prisoners, who have armed themselves and escaped the dungeons. They escape, leaving Fred to face the angry mob.

As the Ickabog approaches Chouxville, Spittleworth confronts it with the Brigade. The Ickabog's belly splits in the confrontation as the Bornding begins, and Flapoon attempts to shoot it. The first Ickaboggle to be bonded devours Flapoon, due to being Bornded in fear of his gun. However, the second Ickaboggle is Bornded kind since Daisy comforts the dying Ickabog. As Spittleworth attempts to escape, he is captured by Bert and Roderick.

Spittleworth and several others, including Fred, are arrested for their crimes. Dan and Bertha marry, as do Roderick and Martha. To redeem himself, Fred helps the first-born Ickaboggle become more mellow by taking care of it. In its breeding, it spawns happy Ickaboggles, and a satisfied Fred dies peacefully.

== Characters ==
Nobles:

- King Fred the Fearless: the king of the story, an inept and easily influenced man.
- Lord Spittleworth: the main antagonist of the book, one of Fred's corrupt advisors.
- Lord Flapoon: Spittleworth's friend and one of Fred's corrupt advisors

The Beamishes:

- Major Beamish: Head of the Royal Guard
- Bertha Beamish: Head pastry chef of the king
- Bert Beamish: Their son, and Daisy's best friend, one of two main protagonists.

The Dovetails:

- Dan Dovetail: Head carpenter at the Palace
- Dora Dovetail: Head seamstress at the Palace
- Daisy Dovetail: Their daughter, and Bert's best friend, one of two main protagonists.

Side Characters:

- Lady Eslanda: A virtuous lady of the court, lusted after by Spittleworth
- Captain Goodfellow: A captain in the army of Cornucopia, son of cheesemakers; unknown to him, Lady Eslanda is secretly in love with him.
- Millicent: Lady Eslanda's maid
- Hetty: a maid, after Lady Eslanda gave her money, Hetty married a man named Hopkins, and she had twins, though she was forced to temporarily give them to Ma Grunter.
- Captain/Major Roach : Flapoon's brutal henchman, and replacement as Head of the Royal Guard
- Roderick Roach: Captain Roach's son and Bert's best friend after his fight with Daisy
- Private Prodd: a private that was supposed to kill Daisy Dovetail
- Ma Grunter: A brutal alcoholic who runs an orphanage in the North
- Basher John: Ma Grunter's violent deputy
- Herringbone: The wise old Chief Advisor who is murdered by Captain/Major Roach
- Cankerby the footman: A greedy footman who spies and tells on citizens in exchange for money
- Martha: A girl from the Marshlands; Daisy's friend at the orphanage who takes care of the other kids
- Otto Scrumble: Spittleworth's butler who impersonates Widow Buttons and Professor Fraudysham
- The Ickabog: A large creature as tall as two horses, with the power of human speech, and the ability to make fire, the last of its kind
- Nobby Buttons: A character made up by Spittleworth

== Audiobook ==
Audible released audiobook versions of The Ickabog in English, Italian, German, Spanish, Brazilian Portuguese, Bulgarian, Dutch, Simplified Chinese and Russian in November 2020. The English language version was narrated by Stephen Fry.

== Reception ==
Jake Kerridge, for The Daily Telegraph, gave the book 3 out of 5 stars, saying "a fun but lightweight fairy tale that lacks Harry Potter's magic". Reviewing the first chapters following their original online release, Kelly Apter of The Scotsman reviewed it positively, praising Rowling's "lush descriptions" and "tantalising cliffhangers". Writing for The Times, Alex O'Connell also rated the novel positively, saying "cake and a monster is the escapism we all need", and rated it 5 out of 5 stars.

=== Sales ===
According to Nielsen BookScan, The Ickabog had sold 90,023 copies as of April 2021 in the United Kingdom, though the numbers did not include lockdown sales.
