= Lightning People =

2011 novel by Christopher Bollen

- First edition
- Author: Christopher Bollen
- Language: English
- Publisher: Soft Skull Press
- Publication date: September 1, 2011
- Publication place: United States
- Pages: 368
- ISBN: 978-1-59376-419-7

Lightning People is a 2011 novel by Christopher Bollen. It is Bollen's debut novel, and was first published in the United States by Soft Skull Press on September 1, 2011. The book is set in New York City in the 2000s.

Critical reception was mixed. Kirkus Reviews described the novel as a "dark character study" and praised its realism and symbolism. However, other critics found the story lines implausible. Viet Dinh, writing for Lambda Literary Foundation, felt that the plot lacked drama and tension.
