= Derek Owusu =

British writer and podcaster (born 1988)

- Born: 1988 (age 37–38); London, England
- Education: Brunel University London (MA)
- Occupations: Writer and podcaster
- Writing career
- Genres: Fiction and poetry
- Notable awards: Desmond Elliott Prize

Derek Owusu (born 1988) is a British writer and podcaster. He edited and contributed to the book Safe: On Black British Men Reclaiming Space (2019) and released his debut novel That Reminds Me in November 2019; the latter was awarded the 2020 Desmond Elliott Prize. Owusu was named on the Granta Best of Young British Novelists list 2023.

== Life and work ==
Owusu, of Ghanaian heritage, was raised in foster care by a white family in a village in Suffolk until he was eight years old. In 1997, he moved from Suffolk to North London to live with his biological parents.

Owusu graduated with a Master of Arts (MA) in Creative Writing from a Brunel University London in 2022.

He is the former co-host of the literature podcast Mostly Lit.

Owusu edited the book Safe: On Black British Men Reclaiming Space (2019), an anthology of writing by 20 Black British men. He has said that the idea was given to him by fellow writer Yomi Adegoke, who with Elizabeth Uviebinené had compiled a book called Slay in Your Lane (2018) and suggested that something similar from a male perspective would be a good idea. It includes essays by JJ Bola, Suli Breaks, Alex Wheatle, Courttia Newland and others that are, as Alex Mistlin wrote in Vice, "addressing the conflicts and complexities of being a black man in Britain today". According to Mistlin, Safe is "about the multi-faceted nature of the black experience, how blackness intertwines with society, masculinity and sexuality to form a coherent identity that is at once universal and unique." Owusu contributes an essay about his experience of foster care.

Owusu began work on his debut novel after suffering a mental break down and having to spend time in a mental health facility. That Reminds Me (2019), a coming-of-age story about a young Ghanaian called "K", was the first novel from Stormzy's imprint #Merky Books, and was awarded the 2020 Desmond Elliott Prize. According to Metro, "there's nothing indulgent about this quietly observed account of a black man Owusu gives the name of K, who is struggling to make sense of a chaotic upbringing and of his place in a world not designed for people like him with a hidden mental health problem." Kate Kellaway, poetry critic for The Observer, picking That Reminds Me as her poetry book of the month for November, called it "brave and moving", also describing it as "semi-autobiographical", as both the protagonist and Owusu himself live with a diagnosis of borderline personality disorder. It was described by The Herald as a "virtuosic debut by a raw new talent".

Inspired by his mother's journey from Ghana to Britain in the 1980s, Owusu's second novel, Losing the Plot, was published in 2022. Calling it "difficult to classify", Lucy Popescu notes in the Financial Times: "It combines a potent mix of fragmented prose and poetry, side notes peppered with slang and abundant white space....In this slender work, Owusu offers a biting glimpse of the immigrant experience relayed in a distinctive Ghanaian-British voice." The Observer also remarked on the book's "category-confounding form", while the reviewer for The Irish Times wrote: "The narrative structure is elastic and malleable in Owusu’s skilled hands as he navigates and positions himself quite literally on the margins, while giving centre stage to his mother's story....Losing the Plot is a masterclass in distilled writing and a stirring ode to motherhood." According to Michael Donkor: "This novel is a reflection of a son attempting to embrace the entirety of his mother – all her vulnerability, spikiness and unknowability. And Owusu does so with extraordinary compassion. The empathy with which Owusu writes of the mother's battles and battle weariness is remarkably perceptive; he observes and captures her fragility with apposite delicateness, never with grandiosity."

In 2023, he was named on the Granta Best of Young British Novelists list, compiled every 10 years since 1983, identifying the 20 most significant British novelists aged under 40.

== Publications ==
=== Fiction ===
- —— (2019). That Reminds Me. London: Merky. ISBN 9781529118599.
- —— (2022). Losing the Plot. Edinburgh: Canongate Books. ISBN 9781838855628.
- —— (2025). Borderline Fiction. London: Canongate Books. ISBN 9781838855727.
- —— (2026). Hunger Pains. London: Merky Books. ISBN 9781529990225.
- —— (2026). The Recovery House. London: Merky Books. ISBN 9781529963809

=== As editor ===
- —— (2019). Safe: On Black British Men Reclaiming Space. London: Trapeze. ISBN 9781409182634.
