= Desmond Elliott Prize =

British literary award for best debut novel

The Desmond Elliott Prize was an annual award for the best debut novel written in English and published in the UK. The winning novel could be from any genre of fiction and had to exhibit depth and breadth with a compelling narrative. The winner received £10,000. The prize was named in honour of the distinguished late publisher and literary agent, Desmond Elliott.

== History and administration ==
The Desmond Elliott Prize was inaugurated at the bequest of Desmond Elliott, who died in August 2003. He stipulated that his literary estate should be invested in a charitable trust that would fund a literary award "to enrich the careers of new writers". The prize was therefore dedicated to supporting and celebrating aspiring authors and their fiction.

The Desmond Elliott Prize was launched in 2007 as a biennial award for a first novel published in the UK. The inaugural prize was won by Nikita Lalwani for her novel, Gifted, in June 2008. After the successful launch of the prize, the trustees decided to make it an annual award. Edward Hogan won the prize in 2009 for his novel Blackmoor, Ali Shaw the 2010 prize for his novel The Girl with Glass Feet and Anjali Joseph in 2011 for her novel Saraswati Park.

The prize is administered by Emma Manderson and the trustees of The Desmond Elliott Charitable Trust, a UK charitable foundation. The Trust is chaired by Dallas Manderson, former Group Sales Director of the Orion Publishing Group. He is joined by Christine Berry, a partner in the charities group at Taylor Vinters, a Cambridge-based law firm, and Liz Thomson, an arts journalist and author. Both Dallas and Christine worked with Desmond Elliott at Arlington Books.

== Judging ==
The panel of three judges, which changed each year, was selected by the trustees of the prize.

When selecting a winner, the judges looked for a novel with a compelling narrative, arresting character, and which was both vividly written and confidently realised.

Previous chairs of the prize include author Sam Llewellyn (2012), BBC broadcaster and presenter Edward Stourton (2011), and authors Elizabeth Buchan (2010), Candida Lycett Green (2009) and Penny Vincenzi (2008).

== Rules and entry ==
The prize was awarded annually for the best first full-length work of fiction written in English published in book form in the UK, written by an author whose permanent place of residence was in the UK or Ireland. Entries were considered from all fiction genres.

The prize was selected from a longlist of 10 titles, followed by a shortlist of three outstanding books. For inclusion in this shortlist, a novel had to have the full support of at least one judge in whose opinion it is a valid contender for the Prize. Each shortlisted author received a hamper from Fortnum & Mason.

The winner of the Desmond Elliott Prize was announced at an awards ceremony held at Fortnum & Mason, Desmond Elliott's local grocer.

== Transfer to National Centre for Writing ==
On 14 December 2019, the Desmond Elliott Charitable Trust was wound up, and its remaining funds were transferred to the National Centre for Writing. The Centre administered the Prize in the same way as previously, with awards made in 2020, 2021, and 2022. However, difficulties in finding sponsors for the Prize led to it being put on hold in 2022 until funding was available. In its place, the centre launched residencies for three debut fiction writers in 2023.

The Desmond Elliott residencies allowed the selected authors to spend a fully-funded week at the centre's residential cottage for visiting writers at Dragon Hall, Norwich. The selected authors, all of whom had published their first novel between 1 April 2022 and 31 March 2023, were Santanu Bhattacharya, Carole Hailey, and Csilla Toldy. No further residencies have been announced since 2023. However, the Centre still promotes the Desmond Elliott Prize on its website as one of three Early Career Awards, alongside the UEA New Forms Award and the Laura Kinsella Fellowship.

== Winners and shortlists ==
Year	Author	Book	Publisher	Ref.
2008	Nikita Lalwani	Gifted	Penguin Books	
2008	Tom Rob Smith	Child 44	Simon & Schuster	
2008	John Walsh	Sunday at The Cross Bones	Fourth Estate	
2009	Edward Hogan	Blackmoor	Simon & Schuster	
2009	Nathalie Abi-Ezzi	A Girl Made of Dust	Fourth Estate	
2009	Anthony Quinn	The Rescue Man	Jonathan Cape	
2010	Ali Shaw	The Girl with Glass Feet	Atlantic Books	
2010	Maria Allen	Before the Earthquake	Tindal Street Press	
2010	Jacob Polley	Talk of the Town	Picador	
2011	Anjali Joseph	Saraswati Park	Fourth Estate	
2011	Ned Beauman	Boxer, Beetle	Sceptre	
2011	Stephen Kelman	Pigeon English	Bloomsbury	
2012	Grace McCleen	The Land of Decoration	Chatto & Windus	
2012	Patrick McGuinness	The Last Hundred Days	Seren	
2012	Rachel Joyce	The Unlikely Pilgrimage of Harold Fry	Doubleday	
2013	Ros Barber	The Marlowe Papers	Sceptre	
2013	Jenni Fagan	The Panopticon	Heinemann	
2013	Gavin Extence	The Universe Versus Alex Woods	Hodder & Stoughton	
2014	Eimear McBride	A Girl Is a Half-formed Thing	Galley Beggar Press	
2014	Robert Allison	The Letter Bearer	Catapult Press	
2014	D. W. Wilson	Ballistics	Bloomsbury	
2015	Claire Fuller	Our Endless Numbered Days	Penguin Books	
2015	Emma Healey	Elizabeth Is Missing	Harper Publishing	
2015	Carys Bray	A Song for Issy Bradley	Ballantine Books	
2016	Lisa McInerney	The Glorious Heresies	John Murray	
2016	Gavin McCrea	Mrs. Engels	Scribe Publications	
2016	Julia Rochester	The House at the Edge of the World	Penguin Books	
2017	Francis Spufford	Golden Hill	Faber & Faber	
2017	Kit de Waal	My Name Is Leon	Viking Press	
2017	Rowan Hisayo Buchanan	Harmless Like You	Sceptre	
2018	Preti Taneja	We That Are Young	Galley Beggar Press	
2018	Paula Cocozza	How to Be Human	Metropolitan Books	
2018	Gail Honeyman	Eleanor Oliphant Is Completely Fine	Viking Press	
2019	Claire Adam	Golden Child	Faber & Faber	
2019	Michael Donkor	Hold	Fourth Estate	
2019	Anna Mackmin	Devoured	Propolis Press	
2020	Derek Owusu	That Reminds Me	Merky Books	
2020	Okechukwu Nzelu	The Private Joys of Nnenna Maloney	Dialogue Books	
2020	Abi Daré	The Girl with the Louding Voice	Sceptre	
2021	A. K. Blakemore	The Manningtree Witches	Granta	
2021	Rebecca Watson	little scratch	Faber & Faber	
2021	Eley Williams	The Liar's Dictionary	William Heinemann	
2022	Maddie Mortimer	Maps of Our Spectacular Bodies	Picador	
2022	Luke Cassidy	Iron Annie	Bloomsbury	
2022	Tice Cin	Keeping the House	And Other Stories	
