= Saraswati Park =

Novel by Anjali Joseph

- First edition
- Author: Anjali Joseph
- Language: English
- Genre: Drama
- Publisher: Fourth Estate
- Publication date: 2010
- Publication place: United Kingdom
- Pages: 272
- ISBN: 978-0-00-736077-2

Saraswati Park is a 2010 drama novel written by Anjali Joseph. Set in Mumbai, the book follows the story of Mohan Karekar, a pensive letter-writer living in the fictional housing complex of Saraswati Park. When his gay nephew, Ashish, moves in with him and his wife, Lakshmi, their mundane life goes through several changes.

Saraswati Park was Joseph's debut novel for which she was awarded the Betty Trask Prize, Desmond Elliott Prize and Crossword Book Award. It was also nominated for The Hindu Literary Prize.

== Plot ==
Mohan Karekar is a pensive letter-writer who lives with his wife, Lakshmi, in the housing complex of Saraswati Park in suburban Mumbai. Bored with his monotonous life, and stifled by his troublesome marriage, Mohan spends most of his time dreaming of becoming a writer. Meanwhile, Mohan's nephew, Ashish, a 19-year-old English literature student, moves in with them to complete his education after his parents are transferred to Indore. Ashish, struggling to accept his sexuality, is attracted to his classmate Sunder and later embarks on an affair with his much older tutor.

== Characters ==
- Mohan Karekar, a letter-writer by profession and the protagonist of the story
- Lakshmi Karekar, Mohan's wife
- Ashish Karekar, a gay 19-year-old English-literature student, and the nephew of Mohan
- Vivek Karekar, Mohan's brother
- Satish, Mohan's brother
- Sunder, Ashish's classmate with whom he shares a sexual relationship
- Professor Narayan, Ashish's much-older tutor who tries to seduce him.
- Yezdi sodawater-bottlewala
- Megha, Ashish's neighborhood friend at saraswati park
- Maryank, Ashish's college friend

== Reception ==
Reviewing for The Independent, Aamer Hussein wrote:

Saraswati Park works well as an intimate and at times wrily humorous study of a unexceptional young man's discovery of himself, through sex and study and the almost wordless support that family offers; it's also good at observing how the young glimpse their elders through a mist of self-absorbed, partial comprehension.

Anna Scott of The Guardian labelled the book "a meticulously written tale of hope and regret" and Sameer Rahim of The Telegraph wrote that Joseph's writing was "well crafted and the images, when they succeed, feel spot-on".

Joseph was awarded the Betty Trask Prize in 2011. Also that year, the novel won the Desmond Elliott Prize; one of the judges, Edward Stourton, praised Joseph's "extraordinary maturity" and added that it was "hard to believe that it is a first novel". The novel also won the Vodafone Crossword Book Award for Fiction, sharing the trophy with Omair Ahmed's Jimmy The Terrorist, and was nominated for The Hindu Literary Prize.
