= Five Blind Dates =

2024 Australian romantic comedy film

- Directed by: Shawn Seet
- Screenplay by: Nathan Ramos-Park; Shuang Hu
- Produced by: Kylie Du Fresne; Nathan Ramos-Park; Shaung Hu
- Starring: Shuang Hu
- Cinematography: Martin McGrath
- Edited by: Mark Warner; Wendy Greene Bricmont
- Music by: Shirley Song; Jina Hyojin An
- Production companies: Amazon Studios; Goalpost Pictures
- Distributed by: Amazon Prime Video
- Release date: 16 January 2024
- Running time: 83 minutes
- Country: Australia
- Language: English

Five Blind Dates is a 2024 Australian romantic comedy film, written by Nathan Ramos-Park and Shuang Hu, who also stars.

With her artisanal tea shop in Sydney unsuccessful, Lia returns to her hometown of Townsville for her younger sister's wedding. At the engagement party, a fortune teller tells her she will meet the love of her life amongst her next five dates.

The film was first released online on January 16, 2024.

== Plot ==
Lia uses her grandmother's inheritance money to open an artisanal tea shop in Sydney which, although not being successful she keeps secret from her family. Returning home to Townsville for her younger sister Alice's wedding to Nigel, she brings Mason, her close friend and workmate, for support. At the engagement party, where their bitterly divorced parents constantly bicker, fortune teller Mrs. Li tells Lia she will meet her soulmate amongst her next five dates. Her palm reading indicates her personal and professional lives are intertwined.

Lia's mother reintroduces Lia to Ezra, a younger teacher at her school. Lia is surprised to see childhood friend Richard, who had lost contact with her years ago. He mentions his family's restaurant is soon opening a location in Sydney, then Alice reveals they are best man and maid of honor.

Lia parties hard, waking in Richard's bed. She freaks out, fearing they had sex, but Richard insists nothing happened. He took her home not knowing where she was staying. He mentions he needs a date for the wedding, but Lia insists she does not. She enlists Mason's help to at least get her a wedding date. Brainstorming what she needs in a potential mate, Lia alerts her family she will let them choose blind dates for her.

Lia's dad Xian finds an extremely wealthy Chinese businessman. Polyamorous Apollo already has two partners he maintains elsewhere and now seeks someone he can take to see his parents and business partners. Lia would have an allowance and keep her tea shop, but she would have to produce at least three sons. Although she declines, he offers to be her wedding date.

Lia's mom Jing sets her up on a date with Indonesian Ezra at the botanical gardens. When he accidentally ingests an allergen, Lia has to jab him with his EpiPen. Later, as they kiss, she hears him say 'Jing' and realizes the 30-going-on-50 Ezra actually wants her mother.

Showing up at Lia's tea shop to assemble the 120 wedding favors, Richard comments on her lack of customers. Lia gets hostile, so he leaves. Alice introduces Curtis to her at Splash Day, where Richard has brought a date. The meditation guru, who is very tactile, helps Lia overcome her fear of water.

On the car ride home, Richard shows his dislike of Curtis. Soon Lia and he are arguing over why they had not spoken for years. When she moved to Sydney to open the tea shop, Richard backed out at the last minute with no explanation. Upset, Lia insists on getting out of the car.

At the bridal shop, Lia's immediate family are all there, so Lia explains how each of the blind dates was unsuitable. When her mother says she is being close-minded, Lia blames Jing's insecurities for her own inability to date normally and says Xian should have left them much earlier. Everyone is upset, so Alice disinvites her to the wedding.

As Lia pours out to Mason what happened, she is rudely interrupted by a live-streaming teen complaining about the shop's lack of trendy drinks and takeout options. Lia launches into a dramatic rant, which rapidly goes viral.

Mason lets Lia mope in her flat for three days before rescuing her. Back at the tea shop, her internet fame boosts business. Even after setting minimum spending requirements for photos and selfies and limiting the number of customers allowed inside at any one time, they sell out.

Lia goes to Alice's wedding, where everyone apologizes to one another, admitting she was right and that they envied her. At the reception, Nigel tells her that Richard not only handled the wedding favors on his own but also single-handedly kept his family and their restaurant together when his mother fell ill.

In Lia's maid of honor speech, she talks of soulmates and sometimes not seeing what is right in front of you. Seeing Richard quietly leave, Lia hurries after him. She asks him why he did not tell her, and he explains he did not want to hold her back, and they kiss.

Back in Sydney, the tea shop is thriving. They have expanded their menu and Lia and Richard are together.

== Cast ==
- Shuang Hu as Lia
- Yoson An as Richard
- Tiffany Wong as Alice
- Berra li as Young Alice
- Ilai Swindells as Mason
- Tzi Ma as Xian
- Renee Lim as Jing
- Rob Collins as Curtis
- Desmond Chiam as Apollo
- Jon Prasida as Ezra

== Production ==
Directed by Shawn Seet, Five Blind Dates is the first Amazon Prime Video Original movie to be produced in Australia. Co-writer Nathan Ramos-Park initially had the idea for a reality show called Five Blind Dates where five people from the contestant's life choose a person that they think will be their soulmate. Co-writer Shuang Hu has described how the film incorporates themes such as "filial piety and some of the responsibilities we feel towards our families in this modern era of trying to make a career and chase our dreams, but also feeling the responsibility of getting married and having kids".

The cast is led by Shuang Hu and also features Desmond Chiam, Tiffany Wong, Renee Lim, Tzi Ma, Yoson An and Rob Collins.

== Release ==
The film was released on Amazon Prime Video on 13 February 2024.

== Reception ==
On the review aggregator website Rotten Tomatoes, Five Blind Dates holds an approval rating of 50% based on 8 reviews.

Angeline Barion in BuzzFeed described the film as "feel good and comforting". Jodi McAllister in The Conversation described it as "refreshing" and "joyful".

== Adaptation ==
In March 2025, a British adaptation written by Nikita Lalwani released on Prime Video, titled Picture This.
