= Picture This (2025 film) =

British romantic-comedy film

- Promotional poster
- Directed by: Prarthana Mohan
- Screenplay by: Nikita Lalwani
- Based on: Five Blind Dates by Shawn Seet; Nathan Ramos-Park; Shuang Hu
- Produced by: Ben Pugh; Erica Steinberg
- Starring: Simone Ashley; Hero Fiennes Tiffin
- Cinematography: David Higgs
- Edited by: Gary Dollner
- Music by: Paul Saunderson
- Production companies: Amazon MGM Studios; Ingenious Film Partners; 42
- Distributed by: Amazon Prime Video
- Release date: 6 March 2025
- Running time: 101 minutes
- Country: United Kingdom
- Language: English

Picture This is a 2025 British romantic comedy film starring Simone Ashley and Hero Fiennes Tiffin. It is based on the film Five Blind Dates (2024).

A struggling photographer receives a prophecy that true love will come to her within her next five dates. With her sister's wedding approaching and her family playing matchmaker, her ex re-appears into her suddenly chaotic love life.

The film was released on Amazon Prime Video on 6 March 2025, receiving a mixed reception.

== Plot ==
Portrait studio owner Pia's younger sister Sonal is engaged to be married. Their mom Laxmi also wishes Pia would get married, but she insists on being independent and believes she does not need a man. Her studio is not making much money, and risks closure. Pia's co-worker Jay asks about Charlie, her first love from school, but she insists he is now with Lily and is going to be the best man at Sonal's wedding.

An astrologer the family hires for Sonal and her fiancé Sam prophesizes that Pia's life partner will be one of the next five persons she meets. At a pre-wedding event, Pia sees her friend Akshay, and her first love Charlie, who is still running a restaurant in Welwyn.

Pia's dad arranges a date for Pia with the wealthy Sid, who is interested in investing in her studio. He offers to give her money in return for her being his wife, but only socially, since he is averse to touching anyone. Pia leaves after accidentally causing his toilet to overflow.

The date Laxmi arranges for Pia is surprisingly Akshay, Laxmi's assistant. She offers him strawberries and chocolate brownies, inadvertently causing an anaphylactic reaction as he is allergic to the nuts. Pia saves Akshay with an EpiPen from his bag. As they kiss, he says her mom's name, and then admits he often goes out to coffee or dinner with her. Pia stabs Akshay again with the pen before leaving.

Charlie sees Pia at her studio and asks her to take his photo. She says she is dating, although secretly referring to her family setting her up, then asks why he came all the way over rather than calling or texting. Charlie admits he still thinks about her.

The next date Pia goes on is with Milo, a yoga instructor. He convinces her to walk on hot coals and later insists the Earth is flat. As she drives out with Charlie, they talk about how they were supposed to keep in touch while she was at uni, but somehow it did not happen. He never visited her there, nor did she see him in Welwyn. They discover that Lily was sleeping in the back seat, overheard the whole conversation, and thinks Charlie and Pia would make a cute couple.

Sonal's wedding celebrations are in full swing. There, Pia tells Laxmi that not only did Sid and Milo not work out, but Akshay is in love with Laxmi instead. An argument breaks out between the sisters, then Sonal asks her to leave.

Back at the studio, an eviction notice arrives in the mail. Another customer asks for a passport photo, so Pia calmly explains to him that taking a photo is about capturing a moment in time and making it last forever. Unknown to her, a customer has covertly shot a video of her statements.

The video goes viral on social media. Jay offers himself as Pia's fourth date, and tells her the story about his coming out to his mom. The next day, many customers show up at their studio after seeing the viral video, so they are booked for months into the future.

Pia goes to her sister's wedding, where she catches her Mom making out with Akshay. Laxmi says she too saw the video on the internet, and gives her the keys to the family jewelry box, telling her to invest it in her photography. Pia fully reconciles with Sonal.

The astrologer asks Pia if she has found the one. She replies that she has not yet gone out on five dates, but she will. Lily is now with Milo, leaving Charlie free. Pia tells him that seeing him made her realize that he is the one for her. Charlie agrees that he has always been so.

Pia and Charlie share a kiss, which the astrologer sees, prompting a knowing smile. Pia then asks him out on a date. Later, Charlie visits Pia at her studio and shows her the Sunday Times Magazine with her article in it.

The last scene shows everyone dancing at the wedding.

== Cast ==
- Simone Ashley as Pia
- Hero Fiennes Tiffin as Charlie
- Luke Fetherston as Jay
- Sindhu Vee as Laxmi “Lax” Jaswani
- Phil Dunster as Milo Bonner
- Nikesh Patel as Akshay
- Adil Ray as Mukul
- Kulvinder Ghir Pandit RBC Fugga
- Asim Chaudhry as Sid
- Anoushka Chadha as Sonal
- Freya Ceesay and Renèe Hart as Teen Girls

== Production ==
Set in London, the film is produced by Ben Pugh and Erica Steinberg for 42 and directed by Prarthana Mohan. Josh Horsfield and Kari Hatfield are executive producers. Nikita Lalwani has written the script which is based on the 2024 Australian film Five Blind Dates, written by Shuang Hu and Nathan Ramos-Park. Picture This entered post-production in March 2024.

Simone Ashley and Hero Fiennes Tiffin lead the cast. The cast also includes Sindhu Vee, Phil Dunster, Nikesh Patel, Adil Ray, Kulvinder Ghir and Asim Chaudhry.

== Release ==
The film was released on 6 March 2025 through streaming service Amazon Prime Video.

== Reception ==
On the review aggregator site, Rotten Tomatoes, 44 percent of the 32 reviews evaluated were positive.
