= Anjali Joseph =

Indian novelist (born 1978)

Anjali Joseph FRSL
- Born: 1978 (age 47–48); Mumbai, India
- Education: Trinity College, Cambridge; University of East Anglia
- Occupations: Writer, journalist, teacher
- Awards: Desmond Elliott Prize, Betty Trask Prize

Anjali Joseph (born 1978) is an Indian novelist. Her first novel, Saraswati Park (2010), earned her several awards, including the Betty Trask Prize and Desmond Elliott Prize. Her second novel, Another Country, was released in 2012. In 2010, she was listed by The Telegraph as one of the 20 best writers under the age of 40. Her third novel, The Living (2016), was shortlisted for the DSC Prize and is a tender, lyrical and often funny novel which shines a light on everyday life. Her fourth novel, Keeping in Touch, was published in India in 2021 by Context and in the UK in 2022 by Scribe.

== Life and career ==
Anjali Joseph was born in Mumbai, India, in 1978. Her father, a research scientist, is a Malayali and her mother is Bengali-Gujrati. When she was seven years old, her family relocated to England. Joseph lives in Oxford in Oxfordshire, and is married to the philosopher Simon Glendinning.

Joseph studied English at Trinity College, Cambridge, after which she taught French and English in London and Paris, respectively. She subsequently trained to be a chartered accountant, but did not complete her certification. She then worked as a journalist with The Times of India in Mumbai. Joseph completed an MA in creative writing at the University of East Anglia, after which she published her first novel, Saraswati Park, in 2010.

Saraswati Park told the story of Mohan Karekar, a pensive letter-writer, whose monotonous life undergoes several changes after his gay 19-year-old nephew moves in with him. Sameer Rahim of The Telegraph wrote in his review that Joseph's writing was "well crafted and the images, when they succeed, feel spot-on". It was awarded the Betty Trask Prize in 2011. The novel also won the Desmond Elliott Prize and Vodafone Crossword Book Award for Fiction, and was shortlisted for The Hindu Literary Prize in 2010.

Joseph's second book, Another Country, was released in 2012. The novel tells the story of Leela Ghosh, a middle-class Bengali girl dealing with friendship, love and betrayal as she travels through Paris, London and Mumbai. Reviewing the book for The Guardian, Joanna Kavenna wrote that the book was "readable and entertaining" and particularly praised the depiction of Indian urban middle-class youth. The novel was longlisted for the 2012 Man Asian Literary Prize.

The Living, Joseph's third book was released in 2016 and shortlisted for the DSC Prize for South Asian Literature. The Living tells the story of two lives: Claire, a young single mother working in one of England's last remaining shoe factories, and Arun, a recovered alcoholic and now a grandfather, who makes hand-sewn Kolhapuri chappals. Amit Chaudhuri's review of the book in The Guardian described The Living as "an extraordinary portrait of two lives that moves between Norwich and smalltown India poses fundamental questions about existence." Arifa Akbar reviewed the book for The Independent, saying that out of all Joseph's novels this is the "most satisfying and accomplished, speaking its wisdom in whispers".

Joseph's fourth novel, Keeping in Touch, published first in India in 2021, is a story of dysfunctional love, and a lightbulb with unusual properties.

She was elected a Fellow of the Royal Society of Literature in 2024.
