= JJ Bola =

Kinshasa-born, British writer & poet

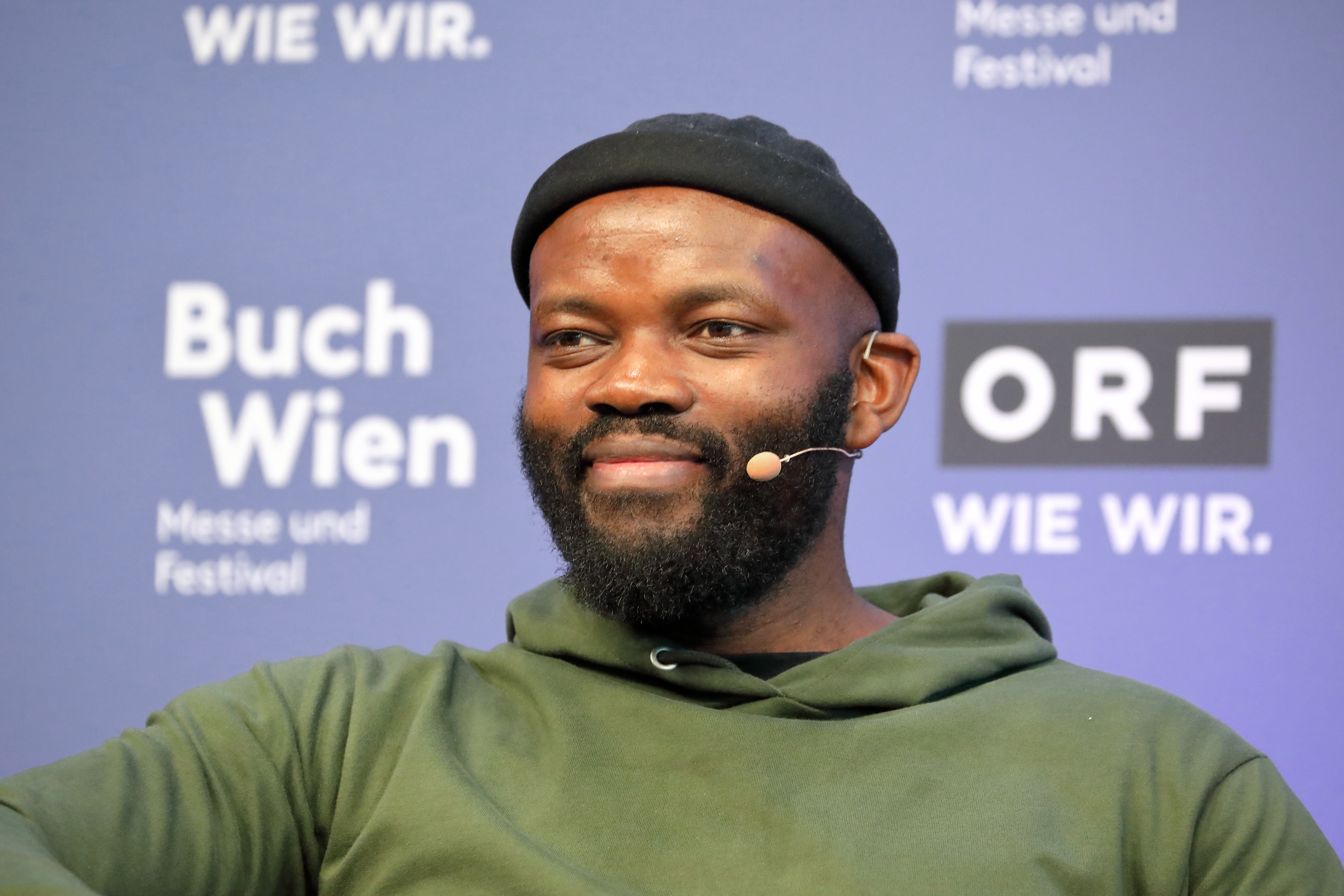
- Born: Kinshasa, Democratic Republic of the Congo
- Education: Birkbeck, University of London
- Occupations: Poet, writer and educator
- Notable work: No Place to Call Home: Love, Loss, Belonging (2017)

JJ Bola is a Kinshasa-born, British-French poet, writer and educator, based in London. He has written three collections of poetry as well as two novels, No Place to Call Home (2017) and The Selfless Act Of Breathing (2021), and a non-fiction book about masculinity and patriarchy for young people, Mask Off: Masculinity Redefined (2019). His writing explores themes of displacement and belonging.

== Life and work ==
Bola was born in Kinshasa, Democratic Republic of the Congo. He migrated to London with his parents at the age of six. He was a basketball player as a teenager, competing in national-level tournaments. Not having a British passport, he could not travel to international competitions and was unable to respond to interest from universities in America.

He won a Kit de Waal Creative Writing Scholarship to study at Birkbeck, University of London (2017), earning an MA degree.

His debut novel, No Place to Call Home (published in 2017 by Own It!), is about the journey of a family coming from Congo to the UK to seek asylum as refugees, which Bola said "tackles the questions of belonging and identity, and this feeling of ... how there isn't a place for you but also how communities come to form themselves away from the places they feel they belong to and how they survive in different spaces and some of the issues and interactions that go around that."

Interviewed in 2017, he further explained: "For me coming to the UK as part of a family who were refugees and not having citizenship and then having citizenship and then having a passport and then being able to attach myself to a national identity that I wasn't able to before, the question of belonging was something that I was confronted with." As he has described himself: "I am a refugee with a British passport."

Bola has been an ambassador for the United Nations High Commission for Refugees (UNHCR) since 2017, when he attended the World Economic Forum. In 2018, his three poetry books – Elevate, Daughter of the Sun, and WORD – were published in one volume titled Refuge, which was read out in the British House of Commons during Refugee Week that year. He was invited to the World Economic Forum in Davos in 2018 and held a discussion with Cate Blanchett.

In 2019, Bola published Mask Off: Masculinity Redefined, a "brutally honest" work of non-fiction that draws upon his own experience growing up as it "guides the reader with a voice, both calm and matter-of-fact, through the ways specific kinds of masculinities have been distorted into violence. Within the first few pages, he asks the question his younger self asked, 'what does it actually mean to be a man?', the question 'that we're not supposed to ask'." Red Pepper concluded that, as a text written for boys and young men, "this is a book that should be in the library of every secondary school in the country."

Bola's second novel was The Selfless Act of Breathing (2021). Reviewing it in The Guardian, Michael Donkor acknowledged that its "conceptual concern with the limited routes available for black people to find meaningful release from systemic racism is, without question, important and emotive", while suggesting that the novel is "compromised by a brand of lyricism that distracts rather than illuminates." The Observer noted: "Bola's ear for rhythm and cadence is sharp, and he lets characters soliloquise as if acing a poetry slam, their diction inflected with the street and the pulpit as they riff on cities, black history, police brutality." Litro magazine concluded: "JJ Bola has succeeded in writing a novel that's not only a pleasure to read but is a necessary navigation through our society." The author himself has said: "The first thing I'm hoping for is just empathy. I want the reader to sit with this person and not think about fixing them or saving them."

Bola spent many years as a youth worker, working with young people with behavioural and mental health problems. He currently works for several projects to raise awareness about the human rights situation in the Democratic Republic of the Congo.

Bola is a regular participant at festivals and other events, speaking and performing his work widely within the UK as well as internationally.

=== JJ Bola Emerging Writers Prize ===
In 2021, the Pontas and JJ Bola Emerging Writers Prize was initiated for writers from "Black, ethnic minority, LGBTQ+, and working-class backgrounds", providing mentoring from author Bola in partnership with the Pontas Literary & Film Agency in Spain. The joint winners of the inaugural prize were the Cameroonian author Musih Tedji Xaviere, whose debut novel about two lesbian students, These Letters End in Tears, was published by Jacaranda Books in 2024, and Bhavika Govil.

== Publications ==
=== Novels ===
- No Place to Call Home: Love, Loss, Belonging. Own It!, 2017. ISBN 978-0995458925.
- The Selfless Act Of Breathing. Dialogue, 2021. ISBN 978-0349702070.

=== Non-fiction ===
- Mask Off: Masculinity Redefined. Outspoken. Pluto Press, 2019. ISBN 978-0745338743.

=== Poetry ===
- Elevate (2012)
- Daughter of the Sun (2014)
- Word (2015)
- Refuge (2018) – a collection, comprising Word, Daughter of the Sun and Elevate

=== Publications with contributions by Bola ===
- Safe: On Black British Men Reclaiming Space. London: Trapeze, 2019. Edited by Derek Owusu. ISBN 978-1409182634. Bola contributes a chapter, "Rapper, Actor, Athlete – Other".

== See also ==
- Category:Feminist terminology
