= The Glorious Heresies =

2015 novel by Lisa McInerny

- Author: Lisa McInerney
- Language: English
- Publisher: John Murray
- Publication date: 9 April 2015
- Publication place: United Kingdom
- Pages: 384 pp
- ISBN: 9781444798852; 1st ed. UK hardcover
- OCLC: 905228416
- Dewey Decimal: 823.92

The Glorious Heresies is a novel by Irish author Lisa McInerney, first published 9 April 2015 in the United Kingdom by John Murray.

The novel is set in Cork, Ireland, in the wake of economic downturn, and explores the meager circumstances and decisions of several characters who are on the fringe of society. The plot explores drug and alcohol abuse, poverty, drug dealing, prostitution, religious abuse, unplanned pregnancy, rehabilitation, and organised crime, enveloped around the accidental homicide of someone, committed by 59-year-old Maureen, which in varying ways implicates the rest of the characters.

The Glorious Heresies received widespread critical acclaim for its vivid prose, dark humor, and compassionate yet unflinching portrayal of societal outcasts. It won the 2016 Baileys Women's Prize for Fiction and the Desmond Elliott Prize, and was named a Book of the Year by The Irish Times and The Guardian.

== Plot ==
Maureen Phelan strikes an intruder over the head with a religious souvenir and accidentally kills him in her home, a former brothel. She reaches out to her son Jimmy Phelan, who runs the city's criminal underworld, and he helps her cover up the crime. Jimmy assigns Tony Cusack, a childhood friend who now works for him, to dispose of the body, threatening the safety of Tony's six children to ensure his cooperation.

Tony's son Ryan drops out of school and begins selling drugs to his peers. Ryan delivers drugs to Georgie, a pregnant teenage runaway who is searching for her boyfriend Robbie O'Donovan—the burglar Maureen killed.

Tony recognizes Maureen's victim and accidentally mentions his name during a conversation with her. Georgie learns from her acquaintance Tara Duane, who lives near the Cusacks, that Tony knew Robbie. When Georgie approaches Tony to ask about her missing boyfriend, he violently throws her out in a fit of rage.

When Jimmy discovers Georgie visited Tony, he takes Tony to a secluded spot by the shore and threatens to kill him and dispose of the body in the sea. Jimmy then instructs Tara to locate Georgie for him.

Georgie goes back to the old brothel where Robbie died. Breaking in, she discovers her mother's scapular, a childhood souvenir she had left behind when she worked there. Georgie realizes Robbie had come to the brothel on the night of his death to retrieve this item for her. Jimmy finds Georgie in the brothel and wants to kill her, but Maureen intervenes, arguing that Georgie's status as a mother means she'll remain quiet. Jimmy gives in and instead forces Georgie to work in one of his brothels.

After Jimmy captures Georgie, Tara realizes she and Tony are no longer useful to Jimmy and wants to leave Cork. She asks Tony to burn down her house to facilitate their departure. Worried about how much Tara knows regarding Robbie and Jimmy, Tony strangles her instead and uses Jimmy's boat to dump her body. When Jimmy finds out, he orders Tony to kill Georgie to eliminate all loose ends connected to Robbie's death. Ryan overhears this conversation and insists on handling it himself.

Ryan sends Georgie to London rather than killing her. Afterward, he overdoses on drugs and ends up hospitalized, with everyone believing he attempted suicide. Ryan comes to understand that a night with Tara he deeply regretted was actually her getting him drunk and sexually assaulting him. He plans to jump into the River Lee, but encounters Maureen on the bridge, who prevents his suicide, promising to help him find redemption.

== Characters ==
Maureen Phelan

Maureen Phelan kills an intruder named Robbie O'Donovan with a Holy Stone in her home and enlists her son Jimmy's help to cover it up. She begins conversing with Robbie's apparition about her painful past—how she was abandoned during pregnancy, shamed by her parents and the Church, and separated from her child. Instead of confessing her murder, she condemns the clergy during confession and considers her past suffering as penance for all future sins. She prevents Jimmy from killing Georgie, when she discovers the truth about Robbie and burns down both the brothel where Robbie died and a country church in a cleansing fire to purge the sins of the Catholic Church.

Tony Cusack

Tony Cusack is a notorious drunk, an unemployed, widowed, abusive and neglectful father to six children, who is hired by Jimmy Phelan to help cover up Robbie O'Donovan's murder by retiling the floor where the killing occurred. He violently beats his teenage son Ryan after learning about his drunken encounter with neighbor Tara Duane, and smashes Tara's window in rage, resulting in court-ordered rehabilitation which he attends without accepting responsibility for his drinking. When Georgie comes asking questions about Robbie, Tony's volatile reaction puts him in danger with Jimmy, who threatens to kill him. His desperate situation culminates in him strangling Tara when she wants to leave Cork, disposing of her body using Jimmy's boat.

Ryan Cusack

Ryan Cusack begins the novel by sleeping with his girlfriend Karine but soon faces a series of hardships: being molested by neighbor Tara Duane (though he doesn't fully recognize it as such), enduring beatings from his father, dealing drugs, dropping out of school, and serving nine months in prison. His relationship with Karine deteriorates after she has an abortion while he's incarcerated and he responds with serial infidelity. Ryan becomes increasingly entangled in Jimmy Phelan's criminal world, ultimately taking his father's place in dealing with Georgie (though choosing to help rather than harm her), before overdosing on drugs, being hospitalized and trying to commit suicide. He is saved by Maureen’s promise of redemption.

Georgie Fitzsimons

Georgie Fitzsimons is a runaway teenager and drug abuser determined to uncover the truth about her boyfriend Robbie O'Donovan's disappearance. Georgie transitions from brothel work to street prostitution before seeking rehabilitation at the Christians Active In Light (CAIL) mission. There, she experiences a brief period of hope when she falls in love with David Coughlan and becomes pregnant, only to face heartbreak when David and his parents take her baby away after birth. This loss of what she viewed as her chance at salvation drives Georgie back to prostitution. Her persistent investigation into Robbie's disappearance leads her to break into the former brothel where he died, putting her in danger when Jimmy Phelan discovers her. Though Jimmy wants to kill her, Maureen intervenes, resulting in Georgie being forced to work in one of Jimmy's brothels until Ryan ultimately helps her escape to London rather than carrying out Jimmy's orders to kill her.

== Setting ==
The Glorious Heresies is set in present-day Cork, Ireland, with a particular focus on the city’s underbelly—its shadowy districts, run-down rookeries, and impoverished social housing estates. Against this urban backdrop, the novel paints a portrait of Ireland in the grip of a prolonged economic recession. None of the central characters are traditionally employed, the Catholic Church is mired in scandal, and the country appears to have lost its moral compass.

McInerney renders Cork with such precision and personality that the city itself becomes a character in the narrative. Through her use of the local vernacular and her depiction of the city’s rhythms, tensions, and contradictions, Cork emerges as a microcosm of contemporary Ireland. Its seeming normalcy is underpinned by deep-rooted inequalities, and its social harmony depends on the invisibility of those on the margins—drug users, sex workers, alcoholics, and the impoverished—whose realities defy the sanitized image the nation prefers to project.

== Themes ==
=== Sins of the church and religious hypocrisy ===
A central theme in The Glorious Heresies is the long-lasting impact of Ireland’s theocratic past and the sins of the Catholic Church, particularly regarding its treatment of women. Maureen Phelan, who as a young woman was exiled to England and forced to give up her child because of societal and religious condemnation, embodies the trauma experienced by generations of unmarried Irish mothers Her personal rage reflects a wider generational disappointment in institutional religion; though Maureen continues to believe in God and the spiritual realm, she distrusts clergymen and regards the Church as a failed moral authority.

The novel frequently juxtaposes authentic spirituality with the hollow relics of institutional religion. Maureen's "holy stone"—a cheap devotional object—becomes the weapon used in the novel’s pivotal killing, symbolizing how religious kitsch and sanctimony can be twisted into instruments of violence. The stone, once intended for reverence, becomes soaked in blood, suggesting that commodified and insincere faith can perpetuate real harm. This is echoed in Georgie’s attachment to a scapular, which also becomes a burden rather than a comfort.

McInerney uses Maureen’s journey to explore Ireland’s transition from Catholicism to post-Catholicism, where symbols of faith remain omnipresent but have lost their original context and authority. The Holy Stone and other sacred tokens linger as vestiges of a belief system that has deeply shaped, and in many ways damaged, Irish society.

=== Redemption ===
Redemption in The Glorious Heresies is portrayed as elusive and morally complex. Maureen does not present as a traditionally sympathetic character—her act of killing, though committed in self-defense, may not have been justified by immediate danger, and she expresses little remorse. She believes that her decades of suffering have earned her the right not to repent, viewing her past victimization as atonement enough. Nonetheless, Maureen seeks a kind of redemption—not in religious forgiveness, but through her actions and relationships.

Her connection to the ghost of her victim, Robbie, serves as a symbolic purgatory. She holds conversations with him, treating the haunting as both a psychological burden and an opportunity to tell her story. Over time, Robbie’s ghost becomes an avatar of her conscience and, ironically, a surrogate for the son she once lost.

=== Motherhood and maternal loss ===
Motherhood—both denied and reclaimed—is a foundational theme in the novel. Maureen's separation from her son Jimmy shapes both their lives: her trauma leads to alienation and bitterness, while Jimmy’s abandonment contributes to his emotional detachment and criminality. Despite their troubled past, Jimmy's sole act of selflessness—retrieving his estranged mother from London and offering her protection—represents his final tether to moral integrity.

Maureen’s story parallels the fate of many Irish women who were institutionalized in Magdalene Laundries and other Church-run homes for "fallen women." The novel uses her narrative to critique how patriarchal and religious institutions historically punished women for their sexuality while failing to support them as mothers.

=== Institutional neglect and social exclusion ===
McInerney deliberately centers the narrative on working-class characters who are often overlooked in literary fiction. The novel explores the alienation and loneliness that stem from societal neglect, particularly around issues of sex, family, addiction, and motherhood. The characters are shaped by shame, trauma, and systemic abandonment, often feeling invisible even in the midst of their own communities.

The novel critiques the enduring patriarchal norms that define femininity and masculinity in limiting and damaging ways, with many characters silenced or marginalized by outdated social expectations.

=== Coming of age and wasted potential ===
Ryan Cusack’s coming-of-age story forms a major emotional and thematic backbone of the novel. At the age of fifteen, Ryan is already dealing drugs to fund his own use and support his family. Intelligent, musically gifted, and emotionally sensitive, Ryan nonetheless spirals into criminality under the influence of his violent, alcoholic father and a society that offers him few avenues of escape.

His love for Karine D’Arcy, one of the few stable and nurturing relationships in his life, adds a layer of vulnerability to his character. Despite periods of separation, including a stint in a young offenders’ institution, their bond endures. One of the novel’s most poignant symbols is a piano once owned by Ryan, which he played with natural talent. It is later sold to Jimmy Phelan’s household, where it sits unused—an emblem of Ryan’s squandered potential and the quiet loss of a different possible life.

=== Ritual, fire, and purging ===
Maureen’s acts of arson are rich in symbolic significance. She sets fire to the former brothel where she used to live and killed Robbie, as well as an old parish church, performing what she views as rituals of national and personal purification. These destructive acts function as a form of protest against the hypocrisy of the institutions that oppressed her and others like her.

=== A people-centered spirituality ===
While McInerney critiques institutional religion, she offers a more compassionate vision of faith rooted in human connection. Maureen serves as a maternal figure not only to Jimmy but to other marginalized characters, including Georgie and Ryan Cusack. Her empathy and willingness to care for others contrasts with the cold moralism of the Church. In her own way, Maureen practices a kind of grassroots, action-based spirituality—one focused on protecting the vulnerable rather than judging them.

== Style ==
=== Narrative structure ===
McInerney structures The Glorious Heresies through a multi-perspective narrative that follows multiple characters whose lives intersect across Cork’s criminal underbelly. The novel primarily unfolds in third person, yet these perspectives shift regularly, lending a dynamic, episodic rhythm to the storytelling. Crucially, McInerney intersperses these with first-person, italicized sections—mostly from Ryan Cusack, and once from Karine. These intimate passages, added late in the drafting process, were intended to bring readers closer to Ryan’s obsessive teenage mindset, capturing a voice McInerney saw as central to the novel’s heart.

The layered narrative structure not only allows the reader to understand each character’s internal world but also mirrors the social fragmentation at the heart of the novel. Despite the characters’ physical proximity, they remain emotionally isolated, their stories orbiting around miscommunication, shame, and missed connections.

=== Language and tone ===
The novel’s language is rooted in the particularities of Hiberno-English and the sociolects of working-class Cork. McInerney draws heavily on local idioms and speech patterns to craft dialogue that is both authentic and energetic.

The novel avoids the trap of exploiting poverty for effect, eschewing voyeuristic depictions of suffering in favour of grounded, character-driven storytelling.

The tone of the novel blends irony, dark wit, and emotional resonance, crafting what Ostalska calls a “tragi-comic standpoint.” McInerney’s narrator maintains a careful detachment—neither sentimentalizing nor wholly condemning her characters. Instead, she strikes a balance between reverence and irreverence, as seen in lines such as “easier to get a taste for arson than murder” (TGH, p. 280), which Ostalska cites as emblematic of the novel’s deadpan humour.

Rosende notes that McInerney’s tone reflects moral complexity: characters are portrayed as both “damaged and damaging,” and reader sympathies shift frequently and unexpectedly. This refusal to fix characters into clear moral categories is, for Rosende, one of the novel’s defining strengths. Even at their worst, McInerney imbues her characters with just enough humanity to complicate judgment.

== Genre and position in literary history ==
Lisa McInerney’s The Glorious Heresies can be considered a state-of-the-nation novel, offering an “unflinching account” of post-crash Ireland.

Critics such as Katarzyna Ostalska position McInerney’s work within the emergent genre of “Irish Noir”—also referred to as Emerald Noir, Celtic Noir, or Hibernian Homicide—a subgenre that fuses the conventions of crime fiction with deep social commentary. This genre is rooted in Ireland’s long history of trauma, including the disillusionment that followed the economic boom. Ostalska emphasizes that beneath the surface of Celtic Tiger optimism, “dark and mysterious forces” persisted, and it is precisely these that Irish Noir seeks to expose.

Elizabeth Mannion outlines several key features of Irish Noir that are evident in McInerney’s novel: an emphasis on witty, biting dialogue; atmospheric urban settings (especially working-class Cork); and rich, morally complex characterization. The genre typically revolves around violent crime—especially murder—and often centres fractured families. It is socially grounded, engaging explicitly with contemporary issues like addiction, poverty, and sex work, while also interrogating the enduring legacy of the Catholic Church, including its complicity in abuse and the marginalization of women.

== Development history ==
One of the novel’s central figures, Maureen Phelan, becomes pregnant as a teenager and is forced to give up her son—an experience that closely parallels the author’s own family background. McInerney’s biological mother was also nineteen when she gave birth, and the child—McInerney herself—was adopted by her maternal grandparents.

In interviews, McInerney has spoken about this formative context, describing herself as someone without “a fixed origin story.” She reflects on having been “born to an unmarried 19-year-old and quickly adopted by her parents because Ireland would otherwise have classed me as illegitimate,” noting that she is “either the cherished baby of the family or a symptom of my country’s troubled relation with religion”.

== Adaptations ==
An audiobook version, narrated by Shelly Atkinson, was released by Books on Tape in August 2016, with a runtime of just under eleven hours.

The novel is also in the process of being adapted for television. Galway-based production company Danú Media has optioned the rights to develop a series based on McInerney’s debut.

== Reception ==
Lisa McInerney’s The Glorious Heresies was met with significant critical acclaim, establishing her as a bold new voice in contemporary Irish literature. The Irish Times named her “the most talented writer at work in Ireland today”, while World Literature Today observed that McInerney “positions herself as the voice of a new generation of Irish novelists.”

Many reviewers praised her stylistic boldness and tonal agility. A critic in Die Presse described the novel as “moving, without the slightest hint of kitsch,” highlighting its emotional resonance, brutal inventiveness of language, and its merciless reckoning with the Catholic Church. Ingeborg Sperl similarly emphasized McInerney’s “talent for the grotesque,” noting that the novel oscillates “between sarcasm and deeply touching scenes.”

Jane Murphy singled out the “humorous and profane” dialogue, drawing comparisons to Colm Tóibín’s style. She noted the novel’s subtle promise of redemption for some characters, adding another dimension to its moral complexity.

Some critics offered more measured appraisals. Publishers Weekly criticized the novel’s “overly circuitous” structure, suggesting that the “violence-riddled story flails under the weight of its complex setup” at times. Nevertheless, the same review highlighted the “authentic and engaging scenes” of Ryan’s sex-fueled relationship and descent into drug dealing. Alfred Hickling noted that the “energy levels flag in the final third of the book,” as characters begin to repeat familiar patterns “to less compelling effect.” Still, he lauded McInerney’s prose for its “clarity and economy,” and concluded that she has “talent to burn”.

Writing for The Sunday Times, Joseph O’Connor drew comparisons to The Godfather and Love/Hate, noting the novel’s exploration of “salvation, sin and shame,” and describing it as “a layered, nuanced and somewhat elusive novel dressed as a Carl Hiaasen romp.” He praised McInerney’s “beautifully conveyed” depiction of a teenage love affair, noting the rarity of such empathetic portrayals of adolescent intensity and sexuality. He also emphasized that McInerney “doesn’t judge her characters,” a stance that adds moral depth to the novel’s narrative. At the same time, O’Connor acknowledged that the novel’s “capacious narrative of Dickensian scope,” while a strength, sometimes compromises plausibility in favor of structural ambition.

== Awards ==
In 2016, The Glorious Heresies won the Women's Prize for Fiction and the Desmond Elliott Prize.
