= Charlie Jeer =

British musician from Kent

- Born: Charles Michael Baljit Singh Jeer; 20 August 2002 (age 24); Kent, England
- Genres: Pop; dance; jazz
- Occupations: Musician; Singer; Songwriter
- Years active: 2024–present
- Label: Capitol Records
- Website: charliejeer.com

Charlie Jeer (born Charles Michael Baljit Singh Jeer; 20 August 2002) is a British singer, songwriter and saxophonist signed to Capitol Records UK. Jeer was born in Kent, England, and is of mixed Indian and English heritage. He began playing the saxophone at the age of 11.

== Career ==
Jeer released his debut single, ''Her Eyes'', in 2024, which gained attention through TikTok's SoundOn platform. In 2025, Jeer signed with Capitol Records UK and released his debut extended play, ''Everything Is Temporary''. The EP includes the singles "Mona Lisa" and "Nobody". "Mona Lisa" was selected as BBC Introducing Kent's '''Record of the Week''' in December 2025. In 2026, Jeer released the singles ''My Madonna'' and "SO GOOD" featuring Simone Ashley, both taken from his forthcoming EP, 'Take Away My Problems', due for release on 4 September 2026. Charlie also collaborated with Mahalia on a reworked version of "Mona Lisa".

== Live performances ==
Jeer's first headline show at NT's Loft in London sold out. He has also performed at The Great Escape Festival and in Istanbul, Turkey. In 2026 Charlie announced his first headline tour that will run across Europe, the UK, and Australia.
