= Jaspreet Singh =

Canadian writer

Jaspreet Singh (born 1969) is a Canadian novelist, chemist, and poet.

== Life and early career ==
He grew up in Punjab (India) and Indian-administered Kashmir and moved to Canada in 1990. He is a former research scientist with a PhD in chemical engineering from McGill University. From August 2006 until June 2007, Singh was a resident in the Calgary Distinguished Writers Program at the University of Calgary. He served as the 2016–17 Writer-in-Residence at the University of Alberta.

== Works ==
Singh is the author of the novel Chef (2008 Véhicule Press/2010 Bloomsbury), and Seventeen Tomatoes: Tales from Kashmir, a collection of linked stories. Both books deal with the damaged landscapes of Kashmir, especially Siachen Glacier. His play, Speak, Oppenheimer, written for Montreal's Infinite Theatre, involves three physicists, including J. Robert Oppenheimer. He contributed an essay to the anthology AIDS Sutra: Untold Stories from India (2008). His second novel, Helium, was published in 2013. It tells the story of a young chemistry student whose mentor was murdered in the course of the anti-Sikh riots in 1984. His personal essay about 1984 in India was published in The New York Times as "Thomas Bernhard in New Delhi". November, a collection of poems, appeared in 2017. More and more his work engages with deep time and the ecological crisis.

== Publications ==
=== Poetry collections ===
- Dreams of the Epoch & the Rock (NeWest Press, 2024)
- How to Hold a Pebble (NeWest Press, 2022)
- November (Bayeux Arts, 2017)

=== Memoir ===
- My Mother, My Translator (Véhicule Press, 2021)

=== Novels ===
- Chef (Bloomsbury, 2010)
- Helium (Bloomsbury, 2013)
- Face (Brindle & Glass, 2022)

=== Short stories ===
- Seventeen Tomatoes: tales from Kashmir (Véhicule Press, 2004)
