= Seventeen Tomatoes =

First edition (Canadian)

Seventeen Tomatoes: Tales from Kashmir is a book of linked stories by Jaspreet Singh. It revolves around two boys coming of age in Kashmir. Published by Véhicule Press and IndiaInk, it was awarded the 2004 McAuslan First Book Prize. The Indian edition spells the title as 17 Tomatoes.

A review by the Montreal Review of Books described the book as "a quiet but worthy debut, a love letter penned to the many-faced land of Singh’s youth".
