= This Tempting Madness =

- Theatrical release poster
- Directed by: Jennifer E. Montgomery
- Written by: Andrew M. Davis; Jennifer E. Montgomery
- Produced by: Andrew M. Davis; Jennifer E. Montgomery; Mimi Chang; William Day Frank; Jessica Malanaphy; Marcei A. Brown
- Starring: Simone Ashley; Austin Stowell; Suraj Sharma; Mojean Aria; Amol Shah; Zenobia Shroff
- Cinematography: Andrew M. Davis
- Edited by: Kiran Pallegadda
- Music by: Rebekka Karijord
- Production companies: Smoke Jumper Films; Mango Monster Productions; CatchLight Studios
- Distributed by: Vertical
- Release dates: November 27, 2025 (IFFI); June 12, 2026 (United States)
- Running time: 99 minutes
- Country: United States
- Language: English

This Tempting Madness is a 2025 American psychological thriller film, directed by Jennifer E. Montgomery who co-wrote the screenplay with Andrew M. Davis. It stars Simone Ashley, Mojean Aria, Austin Stowell, Suraj Sharma, and Zenobia Shroff.

== Premise ==
A young woman awakens from a coma grievously injured, memory fractured, her husband arrested. But as she puts together the pieces of her past, she starts to question her own actions — and her perception of reality.

== Cast ==
- Simone Ashley as Mia
- Austin Stowell as Jake
- Suraj Sharma as Ajay, Mia's brother
- Mojean Aria as Detective Colton
- Amol Shah as Raj, Mia's father
- Zenobia Shroff as Lakshmi, Mia's mother
- Auden Thornton as Gemma

== Production ==
In January 2024, it was reported that a psychological thriller film titled This Tempting Madness completed principal photography in Los Angeles, with Jennifer E. Montgomery directing and co-writing the screenplay with Andrew Davis. The cast includes Simone Ashley, Mojean Aria, Austin Stowell, Suraj Sharma, and Zenobia Shroff.

=== Music ===
Rebekka Karijord had been hired to compose the score for the film.

== Release ==
This Tempting Madness premiered at the 56th International Film Festival of India on November 27, 2025. It also screened at the Cinequest Film & Creativity Festival on March 14, 2026. The film was released in select theaters and on video on demand in the United States by Vertical on June 12, 2026.
