= AIDS Sutra =

AIDS Sutra: Untold Stories from India is an anthology of writing telling the human stories behind HIV/AIDS in India. The book has been published in collaboration with Avahan, the India Aids initiative of the Bill and Melinda Gates Foundation. Proceeds from the book go toward educational opportunities for AIDS orphans in India.

The book features a foreword by Nobel Laureate Amartya Sen, an introduction by Bill and Melinda Gates and essays by 16 contributing writers including Salman Rushdie, Kiran Desai, Vikram Seth, Siddhartha Deb, William Dalrymple, Amit Chaudhuri, Sunil Gangopadhyay, Nikita Lalwani, Sonia Faleiro, Aman Sethi, Mukul Kesavan, Jaspreet Singh, Shobhaa De, Siddharth Dhanvant Sanghvi, Nalini Jones, and CS Lakshmi each of whom spent time in the field exploring one aspect of the Indian AIDS epidemic. The writers traveled the country to talk with sex workers, housewives, vigilantes, police and injecting drug users.

Photos accompanying the collection are by Prashant Panjiar and the book was edited by Negar Akhavi. The book talks about the discrimination that HIV patients face in various public places like hospitals, schools and even in families.

Aids Sutra is published by Random House India in August 2008, by Vintage UK in September 2008, and Anchor Books, US in October 2008. Currently it is available under the title Journeys In the Night from Random House India.
