= Ali Shaw (author) =

British speculative fiction author

- Born: 1982 (age 43–44)
- Education: Lancaster University
- Occupation: Author
- Writing career
- Period: 2009-
- Genre: speculative fiction
- Website: www.alishaw.co.uk

Ali Shaw (born 1982) is an author of speculative fiction from Dorset, England. His 2009 debut novel, The Girl with Glass Feet, won the Desmond Elliott Prize.

== Biography ==
Shaw, born in 1982, grew up in Dorset. He studied English Literature at Lancaster University, and has worked in bookshops in both Oxford and London.

Shaw released his debut novel, The Girl with Glass Feet, in 2009. Featuring a story based upon the premise of a girl gradually turning into glass from the feet up, it was critically well received. Catherine Taylor of The Guardian reviewed it as a "magical fable of fate and resignation". In December 2012 Shaw's second novel, The Man Who Rained, was Paperback of the Week in The Observer.

In 2016 Shaw published The Trees, a novel featuring an ecological apocalypse caused by giant trees. Compared positively against the Cormac McCarthy novel The Road, Kirkus Reviews called the novel "an ecological sermon, bildungsroman, mystery, fairy tale, and horror story all combined into a novel about an improbable journey". Suzi Feay, writing in The Financial Times, stated the novel is "very odd indeed, but certainly compelling".

=== Awards and recognition ===
In 2009, Shaw was nominated for the Costa Book Award for First Novel for his novel The Girl with Glass Feet. His debut also won the Desmond Elliott Prize.

== Bibliography ==
- Shaw, Ali (2009). The Girl with Glass Feet. Atlantic Books. ISBN 9781843549185.
- Shaw, Ali (2012). The Man who Rained. Atlantic Books. ISBN 9780857890320.
- Shaw, Ali (2016). The Trees. Bloomsbury. ISBN 9781408862254.
