= That Reminds Me (novel) =

2019 novel by Derek Owusu

- First edition
- Author: Derek Owusu
- Language: English
- Genre: Bildungsroman
- Published: 2019 (Merky Books)
- Publication place: UK
- ISBN: 9781529118605

That Reminds Me is the debut novel of British author and podcaster Derek Owusu, published in 2019 by Merky Books, a Penguin imprint launched by Stormzy and Penguin Random House UK. A bildungsroman, the novel takes place in the British countryside and in London and traces the childhood, adolescence and young adulthood of its first-person narrator, "K", and deals with the themes of identity, family, trauma, mental health, masculinity and racism. Owusu started writing the novel while he was in a mental health facility and because he wanted to understand the build-up of a mental breakdown. While there are superficial similarities between Owusu’s life and that of his protagonist, the novel is not autobiographical. Owusu himself described the character of K as something like an "alter ego".

== Overview ==
The novel is divided into five sections that chronicle K's life stages from childhood to adulthood. The first section, entitled "Awareness", relates K's memories about his childhood in a white foster family in the British countryside. The second and third section, entitled "Reflection" and "Change" respectively, deal with his move back to his Ghanaian working-class family in Tottenham, London, his school days, his mostly absent father, his discovery of sexuality and his relationship with his mother, as well as with his younger brother, "P", who becomes involved in crime. The last two sections, entitled "Construction" and "Acceptance", cover K's struggle with mental illness, his alcohol abuse, his diagnosis with BPD and his suicidal tendencies. The novel ends with K in a mental-health facility, looking for a half-full bottle of alcohol under his bed and sorting through his pills for the week.

== Genre/Style ==
That Reminds Me is a coming-of-age novel with short chapters of between half a page and two pages in length, and ten to twenty-seven chapters per section. It was initially planned as a poetry collection. Kate Kellyway, a literature critic for The Observer, says that the novel "defies categorisation": "Derek Owusu's That Reminds Me is not quite poetry. It defies categorisation: neither, strictly speaking, a memoir nor, as advance publicity would have it, a novel in verse – although it includes casual rhymes."

Each chapter contains fragments of memories, giving the readers snapshots of K's life. In an interview, Owusu compared this technique to looking at Polaroid pictures: "I wanted each verse to feel like a snapshot, a Polaroid on paper because that's how I see memories. You don't know what happened directly before or after the photo was taken unless they're photographed too." Each of the five sections of the novel is fronted by a statement about storytelling, addressed to Anansi, a trickster character from West African folklore who takes the form of a spider. Owusu uses this framing device as a means of connection to his Ghanaian heritage. The first edition of the novel features illustrations of a spider spinning a web before each new section.

== Reception ==
In a review for The Guardian, author Michael Donkor wrote that while the novel’s topic was "undeniably bleak", there was "a palpable charge and welcome freshness to the voice here that is undeniable."

== Awards ==
The novel won the 2020 Desmond Elliot Prize. The chair of the judging panel, Preti Taneja, described it in the following terms: "That Reminds Me is written with a rare style that wrings pure beauty from every painful, absurd moment K must face."
