= Tice Cin =

British writer and artist (born 1995)

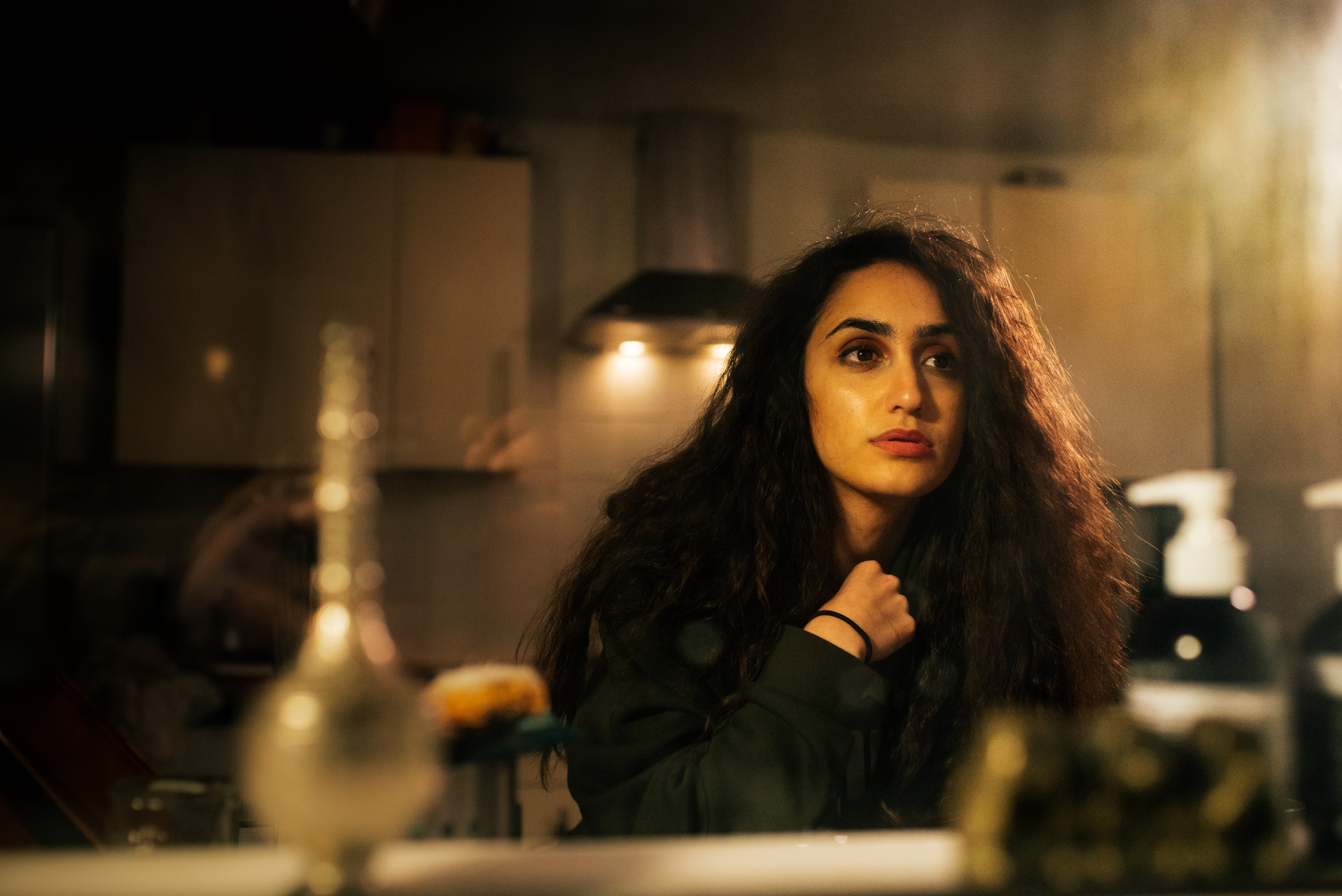
- Cin in 2020
- Born: Enfield, London, England
- Education: University of Reading; University of Northampton; University College London
- Occupations: Writer, artist
- Notable work: Keeping the House (2021)
- Awards: Somerset Maugham Award
- Website: www.ticecin.org

Tice Cin (born April 1995) is a British writer and multidisciplinary artist from North London. Her debut novel Keeping the House (2021) received a Somerset Maugham Award and was shortlisted for a British Book Award and the Desmond Elliot Prize among other accolades. Her BBC Radio 4 documentary How Much Can You Say? (2024) won an Audio Production Award.

== Early life ==
Cin was born to Turkish Cypriot parents and grew up between Enfield and Tottenham.

== Education ==
Cin began her undergraduate studies in English literature at the University of Reading and secured a Certificate of Higher Education before switching to the University of Northampton. She wrote her dissertation on portals and the unconscious mind. She went on to complete a master's degree in English: Issues in Modern Literature at University College London (UCL), specialising in fluids and the posthuman body.

== Career ==
In her teens and early twenties, Cin began her involvement with the North London music scene and admired the likes of Lex Amor, Casisdead and Gladdy Waxx.

Cin made her formal writing start when she joined the poetry community Barbican Young Poets. She also began creating digital art for Design Yourself, a collective based at the Barbican Centre. She joined the advisory board of the Poetry Translation Centre (PTC) and worked in various roles for the likes of Poetry School, Headway East London, Tilted Axis Press (where she was Associate Art Director and Commissioning Editor) and Mixmag.

After Cin received a 2018 London Writers Award and was mentored via the Arvon Foundation, her debut novel Keeping the House was published in 2021 by And Other Stories. Set between 1999 and 2012, the novel is set in and around the north London heroin trade, and follows three generations of women centred on the character Damla as she comes of age in and around Tottenham's Turkish Cypriot community. The concept came from Cin's desire to see her part of London in literature, with the novel taking place between Tottenham and North Cyprus. Keeping the House also considered "glitchiness" and the way that hood surrealism is expressed in the minds of her characters. Cin incorporated poetry into the narrative and created a mixtape, DJ mix and playlist to accompany the novel. Keeping the House won a Somerset Maugham Award and a London Writers Award. It was also shortlisted for a British Book Award, the Desmond Elliott Prize, and the Jhalak Prize.

Tice has been a judge on numerous literature and music prizes, including DJ Mag's Album of the Year and Best of British Awards, the Dylan Thomas Prize 2024, and Spread the Word's Early Career Bursary.

Cin is the founder of interdisciplinary discovery vehicle, label and production company Neoprene Genie. Cin and her team at Neoprene Genie have produced films, curated immersive theatrical music shows and community parties, creative directed and produced print-magazine editorials and collaborated with numerous partners, including Mixcloud, BBC Radio 4, No Vista, Enfield Council and Spread the Word.

In May 2024, Cin produced and provided music and poetry for the BBC Radio 4 documentary How Much Can You Say? with Jude Shapiro of Peanut & Crumb. It was also selected for BBC World Service's Illuminated podcast. The documentary looked at decades of calculated gang warfare involving Turkish, Turkish Cypriot, and Kurdish heroin dealers on the streets of north London, through the accounts of women and young people. Shapiro won Best Factual/Documentary Producer at the 2024 Audio Production Awards for her collaboration with Cin on How Much Can You Say?.

In June 2024, Cin was selected by the British Council and National Centre for Writing as one of their ILX 10, which showcases writers of prose, poetry, creative non-fiction, and those working across intersections of form.

She joined her publisher And Other Stories as a contributing editor.

== Bibliography ==
=== Novels ===
- Keeping the House (2021)

=== Select essays and short stories ===
- "House party and non-mainstream party culture from Tottenham to Enfield" in Guap (2021)
- For A Personal Anthology on short stories (2021)
- "for People Who Feel Glitched" in the Burley Fisher Bookshop Blog (2021)
- "Notes on Queerness and Camp in Crime Fiction" in Literary Hub (2021)
- "The list" in Cybernetics or Ghosts? (2023 edition), edited by Michael Salu for Writers Mosaic
- "Outside, Inside, Both" (2023)
- "Loopholes" in Granta (2023)
- "Soprano Machine" in Cybernetics or Ghosts? (2024 anthology), edited by Michael Salu; this anthology had an accompanying album featuring Roly Porter, Rắn Cạp Đuôi, KMRU, Ah! Cosmos and more

== Accolades ==
Year	Award	Category	Title	Result	Ref
2022	Dylan Thomas Prize		Keeping the House	Longlisted	
2022	British Book Awards	Discover Book of the Year	Keeping the House	Shortlisted	
2022	Somerset Maugham Award		Keeping the House	Won	
2022	Desmond Elliott Prize		Keeping the House	Shortlisted	
2022	Jhalak Prize		Keeping the House	Shortlisted	
2022	Gordon Burn Prize		Keeping the House	Longlisted	
