= Okechukwu Nzelu =

British author (born 1988)

Dr Okechukwu Nzelu FRSL
- Born: 1988 (age 37–38); Manchester
- Education: Manchester Grammar School
- Alma mater: University of Cambridge
- Occupations: Author, poet, teacher
- Awards: Betty Trask Award

Okechukwu Nzelu is a British-Nigerian writer, poet and lecturer, based in Manchester. His debut novel, The Private Joys of Nnenna Maloney, won a Betty Trask Award in 2019. Nzelu's work explores themes of queerness, identity, grief, belonging, and friendship.

== Life and career ==
Nzelu was born in Withington in 1988, and grew up in Bolton and Stockport, in Manchester. He was from a devoutly Christian family, which he has cited as an important part of his world view, although he now no longer describes himself as a believer. He was also a keen musician, playing the piano and flute. His secondary education was at Manchester Grammar School, where he speaks of having been bullied both verbally and physically. He says:

“I remember feeling I was always breaking some sort of rule that I wasn't responsible for and I didn't care about. And I think quite quickly I became quite dismissive of all that stuff because I figured out that nothing I did was ever going to be good enough.”

In spite of this, Nzelu still credits the school for supporting his creative writing.

After school, Nzelu went on to read English at Girton College, Cambridge, where he made friends, enjoyed drama and comedy and discovered the work of Zadie Smith, whom he cites as a formative influence.

After graduation, he spent a year working for a law firm, before working for publisher Carcanet Press. Seeking a different set of challenges, Nzelu applied for the Teach First training programme. Of this he says:

It was a tremendously difficult thing that I did, but there's nothing like knowing that you have made a positive impact on children's lives – however small the impact, however few the children you impact in the grand scheme of things.

In 2014, a friend persuaded him to enter part of his unfinished novel for a Northern Writers’ Award from New Writing North. In 2015 he won the award, which gave him the opportunity to find an agent and to be published.

His debut novel, The Private Joys of Nnenna Maloney, published by Dialogue Books in 2019, went on to win a Betty Trask Award. Described in The Guardian as: "a giant game of lost and found, a vivid picture of people seeking security and identity in the maze of modern-day England," it was also shortlisted for the Desmond Elliott Prize and the Polari First Book Prize, and longlisted for the Portico Prize. In 2021, it was selected for the Kingston University Big Read.

His second novel, Here Again Now, dealing with themes of: "Love in its many forms, the limitations of gender norms, art and addiction", was published by Dialogue Books in March 2022, was shortlisted for the Encore Award.

In 2021 Nzelu was announced as a non-executive director of the Authors' Licensing and Collecting Society.In 2023 he was a judge for the BBC National Short Story Award.In 2024 he was elected a Fellow of the Royal Society of Literature.He currently lectures in Creative Writing at Lancaster University.

== Books ==
- The Private Joys of Nnenna Maloney. Dialogue Books. 2019. ISBN 978-0349701059.
- Here Again Now. Dialogue Books. 2022. ISBN 978-0349701066.
