= Edward Hogan (writer) =

British novelist (born 1980)

- Born: 1980 (age 45–46); Derby, England
- Education: University of East Anglia
- Occupation: Novelist
- Writing career
- Language: English
- Notable awards: Desmond Elliott Prize (2009)

Edward Hogan (born 1980) is a British novelist.

He was educated at the University of East Anglia (MA Creative Writing, 2004). He won the 2009 Desmond Elliott Prize for his debut novel Blackmoor. Blackmoor was also shortlisted for the 2008 Dylan Thomas Prize. The Hunger Trace was shortlisted for the 2012 Encore Award. Daylight Saving was shortlisted for the 2013 Branford Boase Award.

== Awards ==
Awards and Nominations
Year	Work	Award	Result	Ref
2008	Blackmoor	Dylan Thomas Prize	Shortlisted	
2009	Blackmoor	Desmond Elliott Prize	Won	
2012	The Hunger Trace	Encore Award	Shortlisted	
2013	Daylight Saving	Branford Boase Award	Shortlisted	

== Bibliography ==
- Blackmoor (2008)
- The Hunger Trace (2011)
- Daylight Saving (2012)
- The Messengers (2013)
- The Electric (2020)
