= Maddie Mortimer =

British writer (born 1996)

- Born: 1996 (age 29–30)
- Education: Latymer Upper School; University of Bristol
- Occupation: Writer
- Writing career
- Language: English
- Genre: Literary fiction
- Notable work: Maps of Our Spectacular Bodies (2022)
- Notable awards: Desmond Elliott Prize (2022)

Madeleine Mortimer (born 1996) is an English novelist.

== Early life ==
Mortimer is from West London and attended Latymer Upper School. She studied English Literature at the University of Bristol, and has worked in marketing and as a screenwriter. Her mother was the writer and filmmaker Katie Pearson.

== Writing ==
Mortimer has described her first novel, Maps of Our Spectacular Bodies, as "an elegy to my mum and to our relationship". Mortimer's mother died of cancer in 2010 and the book focuses on a fictional woman called Lia who has a "shapeshifting cancer inside her body. Moving between Lia's past and present, the book is a look at memory, mother-daughter relationships, and coming to terms with death". Maps of Our Spectacular Bodies won the 2022 Desmond Elliott Prize, which is awarded for a debut novel published in the UK or Ireland. It was also shortlisted for the 2022 Goldsmiths Prize and longlisted for the 2022 Booker Prize.

== Awards ==
| Year | Work | Award | Category | Result | Ref |
|---|---|---|---|---|---|
| 2022 | Maps of Our Spectacular Bodies | Booker Prize | — | Longlisted | |
| 2022 | Maps of Our Spectacular Bodies | Desmond Elliott Prize | — | Won | |
| 2022 | Maps of Our Spectacular Bodies | Goldsmiths Prize | — | Shortlisted | |
| 2022 | Maps of Our Spectacular Bodies | Sunday Times Young Writer of the Year Award | — | Shortlisted | |
| 2023 | Maps of Our Spectacular Bodies | Betty Trask Prize and Awards | Betty Trask Award | Won | |

== Selected publications ==
- Mortimer, Maddie (2022). Maps of Our Spectacular Bodies. London: Picador. ISBN 9781529069365.
