= Siddharth Shanghvi =

Indian author (born 1977)

- Born: Siddharth Dhanvant Shanghvi; 25 August 1977 (age 49); Bombay, Maharashtra, India
- Occupation: Writer
- Writing career
- Language: English
- Notable work: The Last Song of Dusk (2004)

Siddharth Dhanvant Shanghvi (born 25 August 1977) is an Indian author. His debut novel The Last Song of Dusk (2004) won the Betty Trask Award (UK), the Premio Grinzane Cavour in Italy, and was nominated for the IMPAC Prize in Ireland. Translated into 16 languages, The Last Song of Dusk was an international bestseller. Shanghvi's second novel, The Lost Flamingoes of Bombay (2009) was short-listed for the Man Asian Literary Prize 2008. His third book, The Rabbit & The Squirrel (2018) with illustrations by Stina Wirsen was described by the Hindustan Times as an 'instant classic'. His acclaimed first work of non-fiction, Loss (HarperCollins | 2020), is a collection of essays that chart an intimate landscape of death, grief, and healing.

Shanghvi has contributed to The New York Times, Time, VOGUE, The Times of India, and other publications. He has been featured in India Today's 50 Most Powerful Young Indians; The Times of India's 10 Global Indians; Hindustan Times: 10 Most Creative Men; Sunday Times UK: The Next Big Thing; New Statesmen UK: India's Ten Bright Lights; ELLE 50 Most Stylish People; La Stampa, Italy: World's 10 Best Dressed Men, Men's Health Style Icon 2011; ELLE Style Award 2015.

== Early life and education ==
Born in Juhu, Mumbai, to a Gujarati Sanghvi family, Siddharth's father was a businessman, while his grandfather, Arvind Vasavada, was a psychoanalyst and Jungian scholar.

He pursued his MA in International Journalism at the University of Westminster, London, where he specialised in Photography in 1999. His second masters, in mass communications, was from San Jose State University (MS, Distinction).

== Career ==
He wrote his first book, The Last Song of Dusk, at 22, but dropped it when the agent suggested some changes were required. He then moved to Northern California, having an aunt and uncle in Berkeley, and enrolled in a master's degree in mass communications at San Jose State University. He graduated in 2002 and the book was finally published in 2004.

Shanghvi has been compared to Salman Rushdie and Vikram Seth in his writing styles, especially for using settings of magical realism, and themes such as karma, love, and sexuality extensively in The Last Song of Dusk. His essay, Hello, Darling, appeared in 2008 anthology, AIDS Sutra: Untold Stories From India.

His second book, The Lost Flamingoes of Bombay (2009) which had events taken from the Jessica Lall murder case, received mixed reviews. It also takes inspiration from, but does not credit, the life of the Goan HIV/AIDS-activist Dominic D'Souza, India's first HIV patient, as R. Benedito Ferrão notes. Sanghvi's third book, The Rabbit & The Squirrel (2018) with illustrations by Stina Wirsen was described by the Hindustan Times as an 'instant classic'. His acclaimed first work of non-fiction, Loss (HarperCollins | 2020), is a collection of essays that chart an intimate landscape of death, grief, and healing.

After his father was diagnosed with cancer in 2007, Shanghvi turned to photography. His photography series The House Next Door, opened at Galleri Kontrast in Stockholm in 2010. In early 2011 it was shown at the Matthieu Foss Gallery, Bombay and later at Delhi's eponymous Vadehra Art Gallery. Referring to this body of work Salman Rushdie said, "These pictures touched me deeply. They are at once intimate and clear-sightedly objective, precise and affectionate. The quietness of their world is the silence of memory and sorrow, but there is, too, considerable artistry in the composition, and a joy taken in detail, and character, and place."

== Works ==
- Last Song of Dusk, Penguin India, 2004. ISBN 0-14-303341-7.
- Hello, Darling, AIDS Sutra: Untold Stories From India (2008)
- The Lost Flamingoes of Bombay, Penguin India, 2009. ISBN 0-670-08175-2.
- The Rabbit & the Squirrel, Penguin India, 2018. ISBN 9780670091744.
- Loss, HarperCollins Publishers India, 2020. ISBN 9789353575984.
