= Lisa McInerney =

Irish writer

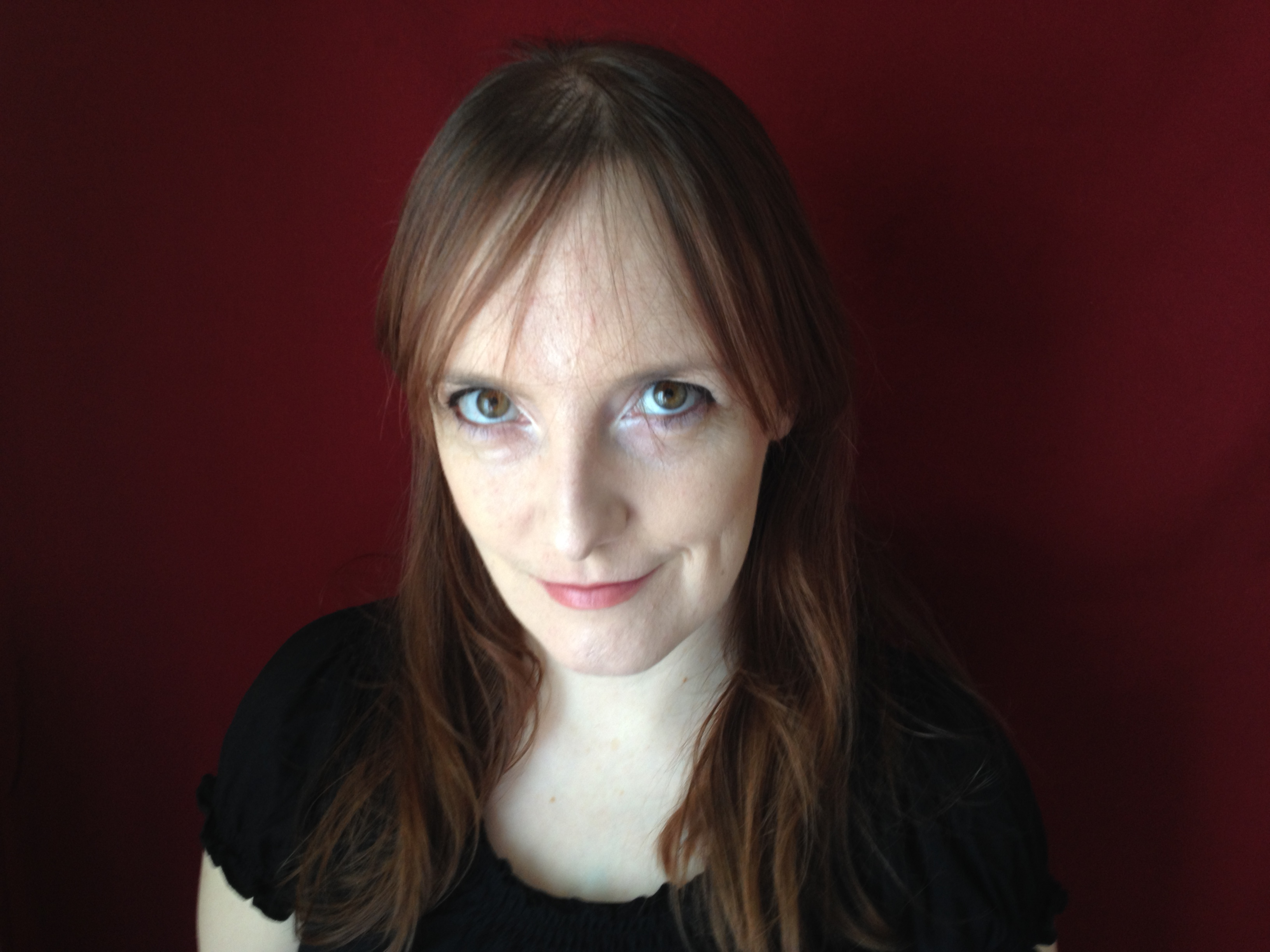
- Born: Lisa McInerney; 15 August 1981 (age 45); Gort, Galway, Ireland
- Education: University College Cork
- Occupation: Writer
- Children: 1
- Writing career
- Language: English
- Genres: Fiction, short stories
- Notable works: The Glorious Heresies (2015); The Blood Miracles
- Notable awards: Bailey's Women's Prize for Fiction; Desmond Elliott Prize; Encore Award
- Website: www.lisamcinerney.com

Lisa McInerney is an Irish novelist, short story writer, essayist, editor and screenwriter. She is best known for her novel, The Glorious Heresies, which was the 2016 winner of the Baileys Women's Prize for Fiction.

== Biography ==
McInerney was born into a working-class family in Galway, Ireland in 1981 and raised by her grandparents. She attended Gort Community School and went on to study English and geography at University College Cork. She is the daughter-in-law of Irish journalist Geraldine McInerney.

McInerney's first publication was a short story, "Saturday, Boring", commissioned by Kevin Barry for the 2013 Faber & Faber anthology, Town and Country: New Irish Short Stories.

McInerney's short work has featured in Winter Papers, Extra Teeth, The Guardian, Le Monde, Granta, BBC Radio 4 and in various anthologies. In 2022 she was appointed editor of the Irish literary magazine The Stinging Fly.

=== Novels ===
McInerney's debut novel, The Glorious Heresies, published by John Murray, followed in April 2015. Telling the story of five misfits on the fringes of Ireland's post-crash society whose lives interconnect after a messy murder, it won the Baileys Women's Prize for Fiction and the Desmond Elliott Prize in 2016. It has been translated into French, in which it won the 2018 Ireland Francophonie Ambassadors' Literary Award; Italian, in which it was shortlisted for the Strega European Prize and won the Premio Edoardo Kihlgren for European literature; Spanish, Dutch, German, Czech, Serbian, Polish, Danish and Macedonian.

McInerney's second novel, The Blood Miracles, was published by John Murray in April 2017. Focusing on Ryan Cusack, the youngest character from The Glorious Heresies, it was joint winner of the 2018 RSL's Encore Award and was longlisted for the 2018 Dylan Thomas Prize. It has been translated into Spanish, French, Italian, Czech, German and Danish.

McInerney's third novel, The Rules of Revelation, was published by John Murray in May, 2021.

The rights to adapt McInerney's Cork City set (The Glorious Heresies, The Blood Miracles and The Rules of Revelation) for television were bought by ITV Studios, with McInerney contracted to write the screenplays.

=== Influences ===
She has named Hubert Selby Jr. as an influence on her attitude towards writing. Her "big characters" and juicy wording have resulted in comparisons with Patrick McCabe and Irvine Welsh.

== Published works ==
=== Novels ===
- The Glorious Heresies (2015)
- The Blood Miracles (2017)
- The Rules of Revelation (2021)

=== Stories ===
- "Saturday, Boring" in the anthology Town and Country (Faber) (2013)
- "Berghain" in the anthology The Long Gaze Back (New Island) (2015)
- "Redoubt" for BBC Radio 4 (2015)
- "The Butcher's Apron" in The Stinging Fly: In the Wake of the Rising (2016)
- "Navigation" for Granta (2016)
- "Five Sites, Five Stages" in the anthology I Am Heathcliff: Stories Inspired by Wuthering Heights, edited by Kate Mosse (HarperCollins) (2018)
- "Gérard", in the anthology Being Various (Faber) (2019)
- "Nowhere Now" in Extra Teeth Issue One (2019)

=== Essays ===
- "Seize the Means of Publication" in the anthology Beyond the Centre: Writers in Their Own Words (New Island) (2016)
- "Half-Answered Questions on Fiction" for the European Federation of Associations and Centres of Irish Studies (2018)
- "Working Class - An Escape Manual" in the anthology Common People: An Anthology of Working Class Writers, edited by Kit de Waal (2019)
- "Fantastic Babies: Notes on a K-pop Music Video" in The Stinging Fly: Summer 2020 (2020)

=== Others ===
- Fake Tan (Short film) (2020)
- The Stinging Fly X Galway 2020 (as editor) (2020)

== Awards ==
=== Won ===
- 2016 Baileys Women's Prize for Fiction
- 2016 Desmond Elliott Prize
- 2018 Encore Award
- 2018 Ireland Francophonie Ambassadors' Literary Award
- 2018 Premio Edoardo Kihlgren

=== Nominated ===
- 2015 Irish Book Awards
- 2016 Theakston's Old Peculier Crime Novel of the Year Award
- 2016 and 2018 Dylan Thomas Prize
- 2017 Sunday Times EFG Short Story Award, for "Navigation".
- 2018 Strega European Prize
- 2019 International Dublin Literary Award
