= Nikita Lalwani =

Indian-born Welsh writer

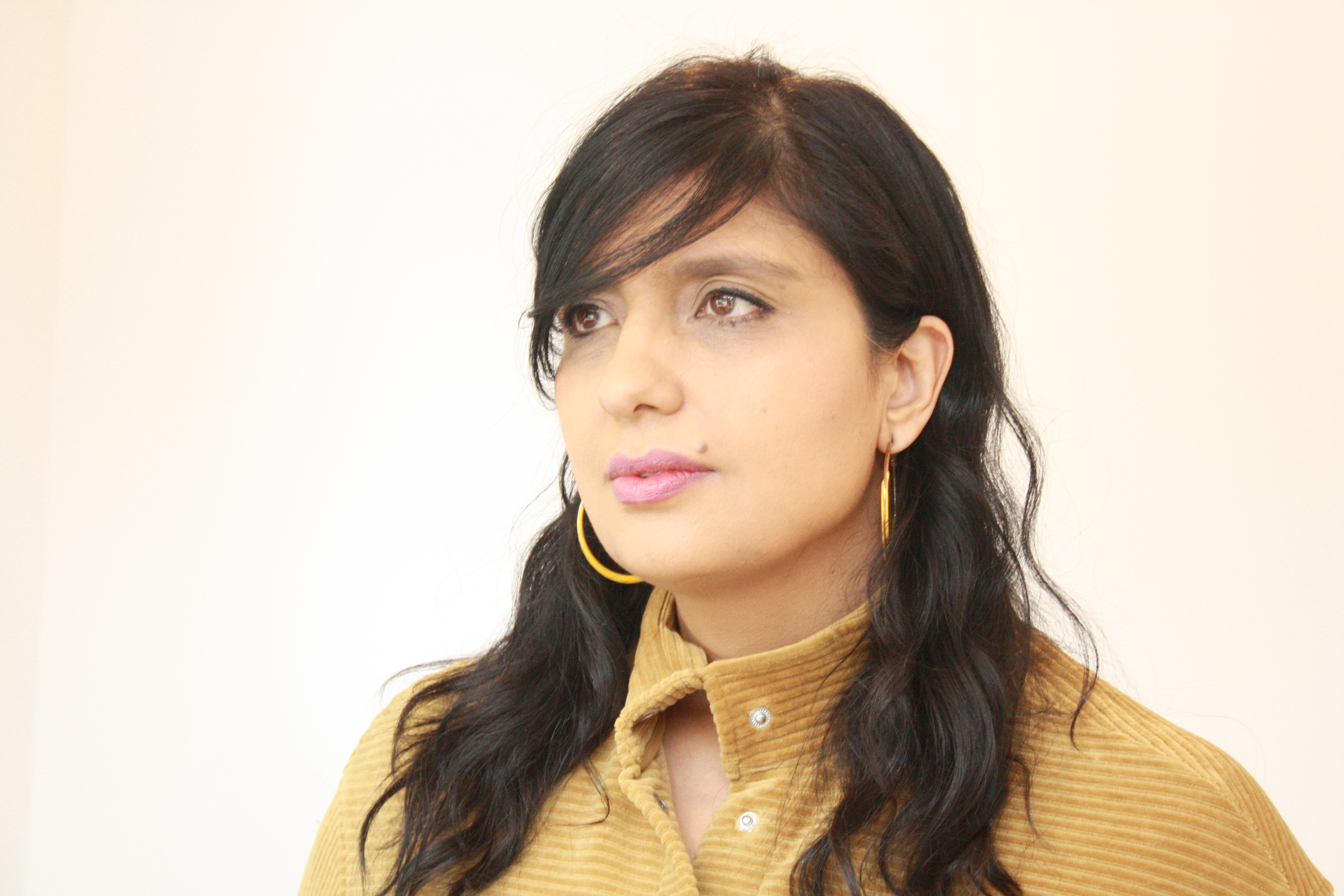
Lalwani in 2020

Nikita Lalwani FRSL is an Indian-born Welsh novelist. She was born in Kota, Rajasthan, and raised in Cardiff, Wales. Her work has been translated into sixteen languages.

== Career ==
She studied English at University of Bristol.

Her first book, Gifted (2007), was longlisted for the Man Booker Prize and shortlisted for the Costa Book Award for First Novel. Lalwani was nominated as Sunday Times Young Writer of the Year. In June 2008, she won the inaugural Desmond Elliott Prize. She donated the £10,000 prize to Liberty, a human rights advocacy nonprofit.

Lalwani's second book, The Village, was published in 2012 and was selected as one of eight titles for the Fiction Uncovered Prize in 2013.

Lalwani has contributed to The Guardian, the New Statesman and The Observer. She has also written for AIDS Sutra, an anthology exploring the lives of people living with HIV/AIDS in India.

In 2013, Lalwani was a book judge for the Orwell Prize. In 2018, she was elected a Fellow of the Royal Society of Literature. She was later a judge for the Royal Society of Literature Encore Award in 2019. In the same year, she contributed to the anthology Resist: Stories of Uprising. Her novel You People, set in a West London pizzeria where most of the staff are illegal immigrants, was published in 2020 by Penguin and in 2021 by McSweeney's USA.

Lalwani co-wrote three episodes of the BBC One/Amazon Studios series The Outlaws, including two episodes with Stephen Merchant and one with Jess Bray.

She also wrote the screenplay for the romantic comedy Picture This for Amazon Studios, starring Simone Ashley, and wrote an episode of crime thriller Under Salt Marsh for Sky Studios.

== Selected works ==
=== Novels ===
- Gifted (2007)
- The Village (2012)
- You People (2020)

=== Film ===
- Picture This (2025) Screenplay Amazon Studios

=== Television ===
- Under Salt Marsh Series 1, Episode 4, Writer 2025 forthcoming
- The Outlaws S1E3 (2021) BBC/Amazon Studios

Written by Stephen Merchant and Nikita Lalwani

- The Outlaws 2022 S2E3 (2022) BBC/Amazon Studios

Written by Stephen Merchant and Nikita Lalwani

- The Outlaws 2024 S3E3 (2024) BBC/Amazon Studios

Written by Nikita Lalwani and Jess Bray
