= Simone Ashley =

English actress (born 1995)

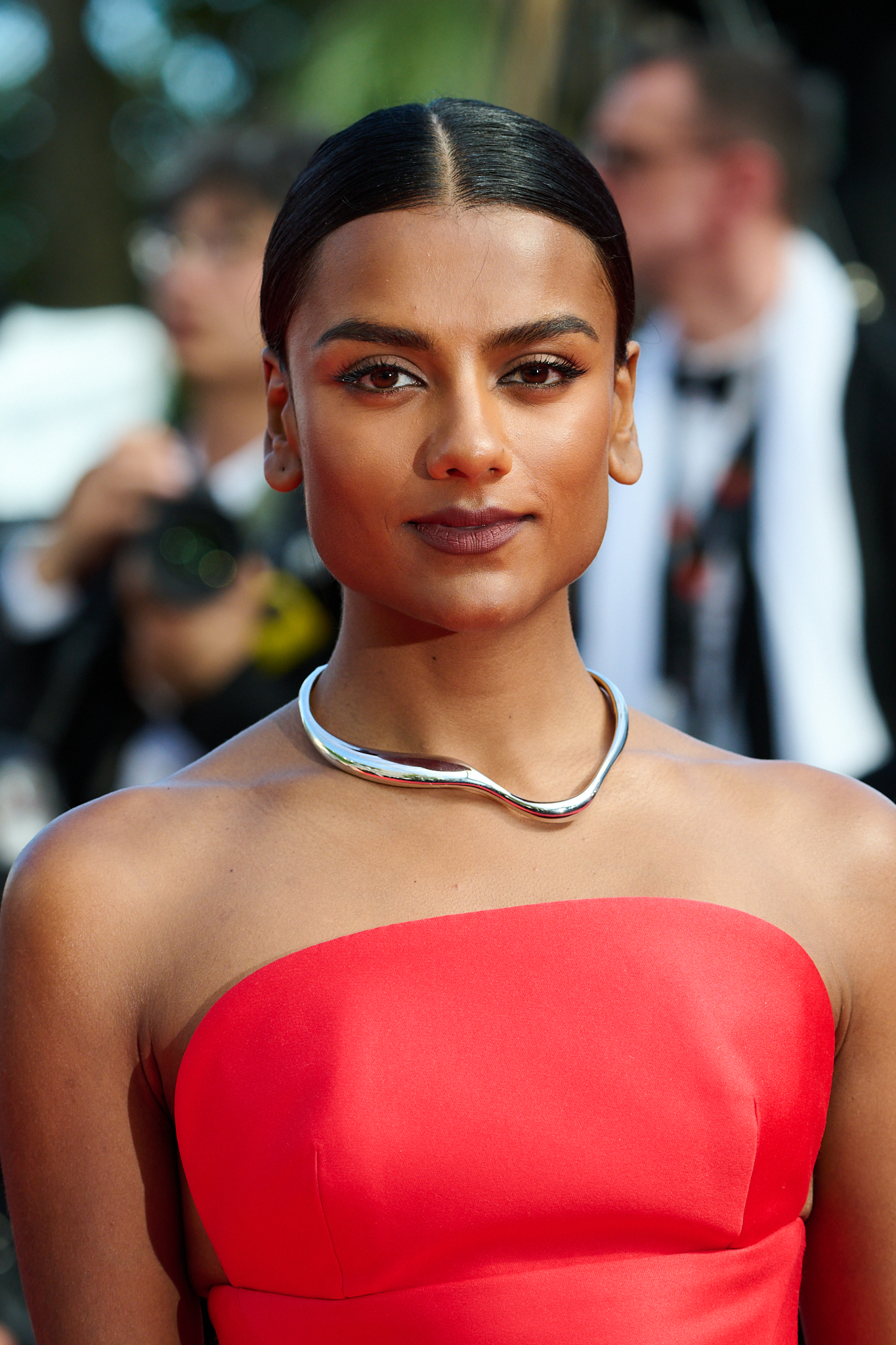
- Ashley in 2025
- Born: Simone Ashwini Pillai; 30 March 1995 (age 31); Camberley, Surrey, England
- Education: Arts Educational Schools
- Occupation: Actress
- Years active: 2016–present
- Awards: Golden Nymph Award

Simone Ashwini Pillai (born 30 March 1995), known professionally as Simone Ashley, is a British actress. On television, she is known for her roles as Kate Bridgerton in the Netflix period drama Bridgerton (2022–present) and Olivia Hanan in the comedy-drama Sex Education (2019–2021). Her films include Picture This, This Tempting Madness (both 2025), and The Devil Wears Prada 2 (2026).

In 2024, Ashley received the Golden Nymph Award for Most Promising Talent from the Monte-Carlo Television Festival.

== Early life ==
Born Simone Ashwini Pillai to Indian Tamil-speaking parents Latha and Gunasekharan Pillai, Ashley is from Camberley, Surrey, and has an older brother, Sean Pillai. Ashley has spoken about how despite growing up in a household of academics, she was always drawn more towards the creative fields. Her parents were hesitant about her inclination to the arts. "My parents were quite protective over me", she told Glamour. "They're first generation. They came from India to this country, so they didn't really have a life where they could choose to be whatever they wanted." Ashley grew up singing classical music, opera, and playing the piano.

Ashley's family later moved to Beaconsfield, where she attended Beaconsfield High School and then Redroofs Theatre School in Maidenhead for sixth form. She left school early at sixteen, describing herself as "very stubborn" and "wishing my life away". She spent some of her teen years in Ojai, California, where she has relatives. She signed with a modelling agency and began auditioning when she was 18. She then studied acting at Arts Educational Schools (ArtsEd) in West London.

== Career ==
=== Beginnings (2016–2020) ===
Ashley's first acting role was in two episodes of the CBBC fantasy teen drama Wolfblood as Zuhra. This was followed by appearances in the thriller series Guilt (2016) and the ITV crime drama Broadchurch (2017). She made her feature film debut in 2018 with a small role in Boogie Man as Aarti, and a more prominent role in Kill Ben Lyk as one of the many characters named Ben Lyk. From 2019 to 2021, Ashley played the recurring character Olivia Hanan in the Netflix comedy-drama Sex Education. She also appeared in the ITV psychological thriller miniseries The Sister as Elise Fox in 2020.

=== Breakthrough, film work and music (2022–present) ===
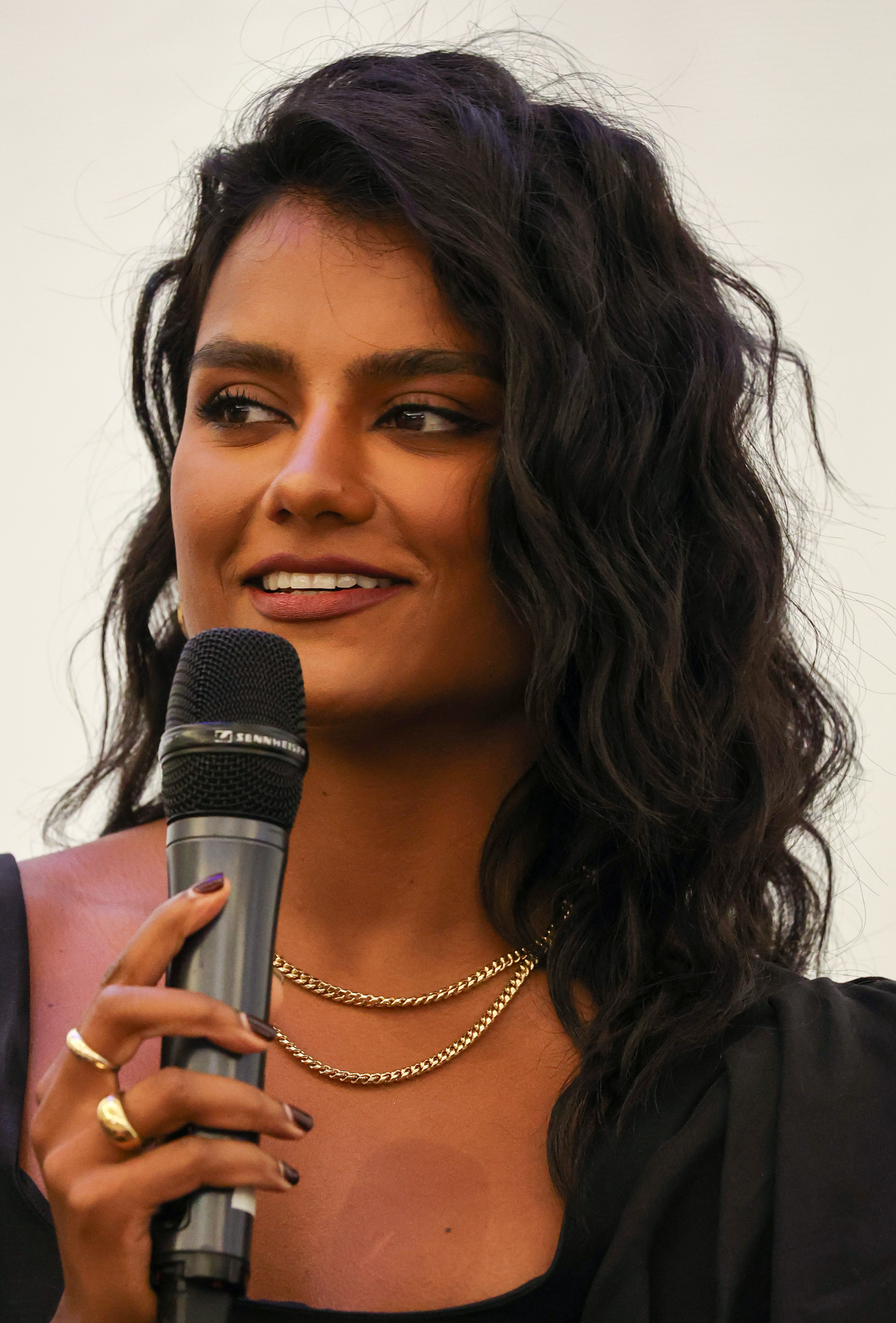
Ashley in 2022

Having auditioned in 2020, it was announced in February 2021 that Ashley would star as leading lady Kate Sharma, opposite Jonathan Bailey, in the second series of the Shondaland-produced Netflix romance period drama Bridgerton, based on the second novel in Julia Quinn's Bridgerton series, The Viscount Who Loved Me. The series was released in March 2022. She reprised her role for the third series.

Ashley was named one of Variety's 2021 Brits to Watch. In 2022, Ashley featured in the Forbes 30 Under 30 list in European entertainment, the Time 100 Next, and The Hollywood Reporter's Great British and Irish Film and TV Breakouts. She appeared on the cover of British Vogue's December 2022 and March 2024 issues, the latter as part of an ensemble of 40 women gathered to honor and celebrate Edward Enninful's tenure as editor.

She played Indira, a sister of Ariel, in the 2023 live-action film adaptation of Disney's The Little Mermaid. On 9 July 2024, Ashley was cast in the film F1, but her role was mostly cut. In 2025, Ashley had starring film roles in the romantic comedy Picture This on Amazon Prime as Pia and the psychological thriller This Tempting Madness as Mia. In March 2025, Ashley revealed that she was in the process of recording her debut album with producer Fraser T. Smith. She became a L'Oréal Paris spokesperson in May 2024.

In February 2026, it was announced that Ashley had joined the cast of the A24 comedy film Peaked, directed by Molly Gordon. That same month, Ashley was also confirmed to star in Dominic Savage's upcoming musical romance Falling alongside Sam Claflin and Evan Peters.

She released her debut EP, Songs I Wrote In New York on April 10th, 2026.

== Personal life ==
From summer 2022 to January 2025, Ashley was in a relationship with former lawyer Constantin "Tino" Klein, the CEO of F.A.T. Ice Race, after meeting at the 2022 Monaco Grand Prix. As of 2022, Ashley has a show cocker spaniel.

== Filmography ==
Key
†	Denotes films that have not yet been released

=== Film ===
Year	Title	Role	Notes	Ref.
2018	Boogie Man	Aarti		
2018	Kill Ben Lyk	Girl Ben Lyk		
2018	Sparrow	Taylor	Short film	
2019	Detective Pikachu	Girlfriend		
2023	The Little Mermaid	Indira		
2024	10 Lives	Rose (voice)		
2024	The Night Before Christmas in Wonderland	Alice (voice)		
2025	Picture This	Pia	Also executive producer	
2025	F1	Unknown	Deleted scenes	
2025	This Tempting Madness	Mia		
2026	The Devil Wears Prada 2	Amari Mari		
TBA	Peaked †	TBA	Filming	

=== Television ===
Year	Title	Role	Notes	Ref.
2016	Wolfblood	Zuhra	2 episodes	
2016	Guilt	Amanda	Episode: "A Simple Plan"	
2017	Broadchurch	Dana	2 episodes	
2017	Strike	Alicia	Episode: "The Cuckoo's Calling: Part 3"	
2017	L'ispettore Coliandro	Veena	Episode: "Mortal Club"	
2018	Doctors	Sofia Johal	Episode: "Any Moment"	
2019	Casualty	Shai Anderson	1 episode	
2019	A Working Mom's Nightmare	Aisha	Television film	
2019–2021	Sex Education	Olivia Hanan	Main role (season 1–3)	
2020	The Sister	Elise Fox	Recurring role	
2022–present	Bridgerton	Kathani "Kate" Bridgerton (née Sharma), Viscountess Bridgerton	Main role (season 2–present); 13 episodes	
2026	Only Murders in the Building	TBA	Launches on December 8	

=== Music videos appearances ===
Song	Year	Artist	Notes	Ref.
"Love Letter"	2022	Odesza feat. The Knocks		
"Eve & Paradise Lost"	2024	Bastille		
"So Good"	2026	Charlie Jeer feat. Simone Ashley		

== Awards and nominations ==
Year	Award	Category	Nominated work	Result	Ref.
2022	Hollywood Critics Association TV Awards	Best Actress in a Streaming Series, Drama	Bridgerton	Nominated	
2022	TV Choice Awards UK	Best Actress	Bridgerton	Nominated	
2022	IMDb Starmeter Award	Breakout Star	Bridgerton	Won	
2024	Monte-Carlo Television Festival	Most Promising Talent	—N/a	Won	
2024	Glamour Awards	Gamechanging Actor	—N/a	Won	
2025	Actor Awards	Outstanding Performance by an Ensemble in a Drama Series	Bridgerton	Nominated	
2025	National Film Awards	Outstanding Performance 2025	Picture This	Nominated	
2026	Gold Derby TV Awards	Drama Guest Actress	Bridgerton	Won	
