= Slay in Your Lane =

Series of books by Yomi Adegoke and Elizabeth Uviebinené

Slay in Your Lane is a series of books and a podcast by journalist Yomi Adegoke and brand strategist Elizabeth Uviebinené. The first book in the series, Slay in Your Lane: The Black Girl Bible (2018), is based on interviews the pair conducted with "39 successful black British women spanning different industries". The Daily Telegraph described it as "one of the most satisfying attempts in recent years to answer the question: why do black British women feel that their success is hindered?"

The second book in the series, Slay in Your Lane: The Journal, was published in 2019.

== Slay in Your Lane: The Black Girl Bible ==
Slay In Your Lane: The Black Girl Bible
- First edition
- Author: Yomi Adegoke and Elizabeth Uviebinené
- Language: English
- Published: 4th Estate (2018)
- Publication place: United Kingdom
- Pages: 384 pp.
- ISBN: 978-0008235628

Slay in Your Lane: The Black Girl Bible covers education, work, getting ahead, representation, dating, and health.

"Over 341 pages, [Adegoke] and her best friend, Elizabeth Uviebinené, succinctly address why black girls are more likely to fall behind in education (black pupils have the lowest rate of achieving five A*-C grades of any ethnic group); why they earn less, even when they are as qualified, than their white counterparts ("black graduates are, on average, paid £4.30 an hour less than white graduates"); why black women find it so hard to date (only five per cent of 18 to 24-year-olds have dated outside their race, and on dating apps, black men are more likely to pick white women than black); and why so many black women are battling mental health problems in secret."

It is based on interviews the authors conducted with "39 successful black British women spanning different industries", namely: businesswoman Ade Hassan; writer and broadcaster Afua Hirsch; Aj Odudu; Alexis Oladipo; public sector executive Althea Efunshile; director Amma Asante; computing, mathematics and language child prodigy Anne-Marie Imafidon; playwright Bola Agbaje; journalist and newsreader Charlene White; radio DJ and television presenter Clara Amfo; Clare Anyiam-Osigwe; actress, singer and songwriter Cynthia Erivo; Labour Party MP Dawn Butler; sports presenter and former track and field athlete Denise Lewis; singer, songwriter, rapper, record producer, and actress Estelle; Florence Adepoju; businesswoman, lawyer and public speaker Funke Abimbola; television and radio presenter Gemma Cairney; Irene Agbontaen; singer, songwriter and TV presenter Jamelia; TV broadcaster June Sarpong; advertising industry professional and chair of MediaCom UK Karen Blackett; singer and songwriter Keisha Buchanan; rapper, singer, and producer Lady Leshurr; Lakwena, recording artist, songwriter and composer Laura Mvula; space scientist Maggie Aderin-Pocock; author and former Children's Laureate Malorie Blackman; publisher, editor, writer and broadcaster Margaret Busby; entrepreneur and author Melanie Eusebe; author and Reader in Equality & Education at Goldsmiths College, University of London, Nicola Rollock; Patricia Bright, TV and radio presenter, actress, voice-over artist, and DJ Sarah-Jane Crawford; entrepreneur Sharmadean Reid; Sharmaine Lovegrove; actress and writer Susan Wokoma; publishing director of British Vogue Vanessa Kingori; Vanessa Amadi; and singer-songwriter, model and record producer V V Brown. It has a foreword by Karen Blackett.

In 2019 the book's authors accused the BBC of plagiarism for using their trademarked slogan "Slay in Your Lane" in a women's sport promotion.

=== Reception ===
Funmi Fetto described the book in British Vogue as "a comprehensive, inspirational tool book [...] that is bound to resonate with many black British women seeking to assimilate the heritage of their parents with their sense of place in British society."

Corrine Corrodus, reviewing the book in The Daily Telegraph, described it as "one of the most satisfying attempts in recent years to answer the question: why do black British women feel that their success is hindered? [...] This book is as much a rallying cry to black women across the British Isles as it is a solid foundation for serious discussions about modern race relations."

In July 2018 it was a BBC Radio 4 Book of the Week.

== Slay in Your Lane: The Journal ==
Slay In Your Lane: The Journal
- Author: Yomi Adegoke and Elizabeth Uviebinené
- Language: English
- Published: 4th Estate (2019)
- Publication place: United Kingdom
- Pages: 176 pp.
- ISBN: 978-0008342609

In 2019 Adegoke and Uviebinené published Slay in Your Lane: The Journal, illustrated by Sherida Kuffour.

== Slay in Your Lane: The Podcast ==
In April 2020, Adegoke and Uviebinené launched Slay in Your Lane: The Podcast, which covers news and popular culture topics discussed in the book. The podcast is produced by Studio71.
