= Yomi Adegoke =

British journalist and author (b. 1991)

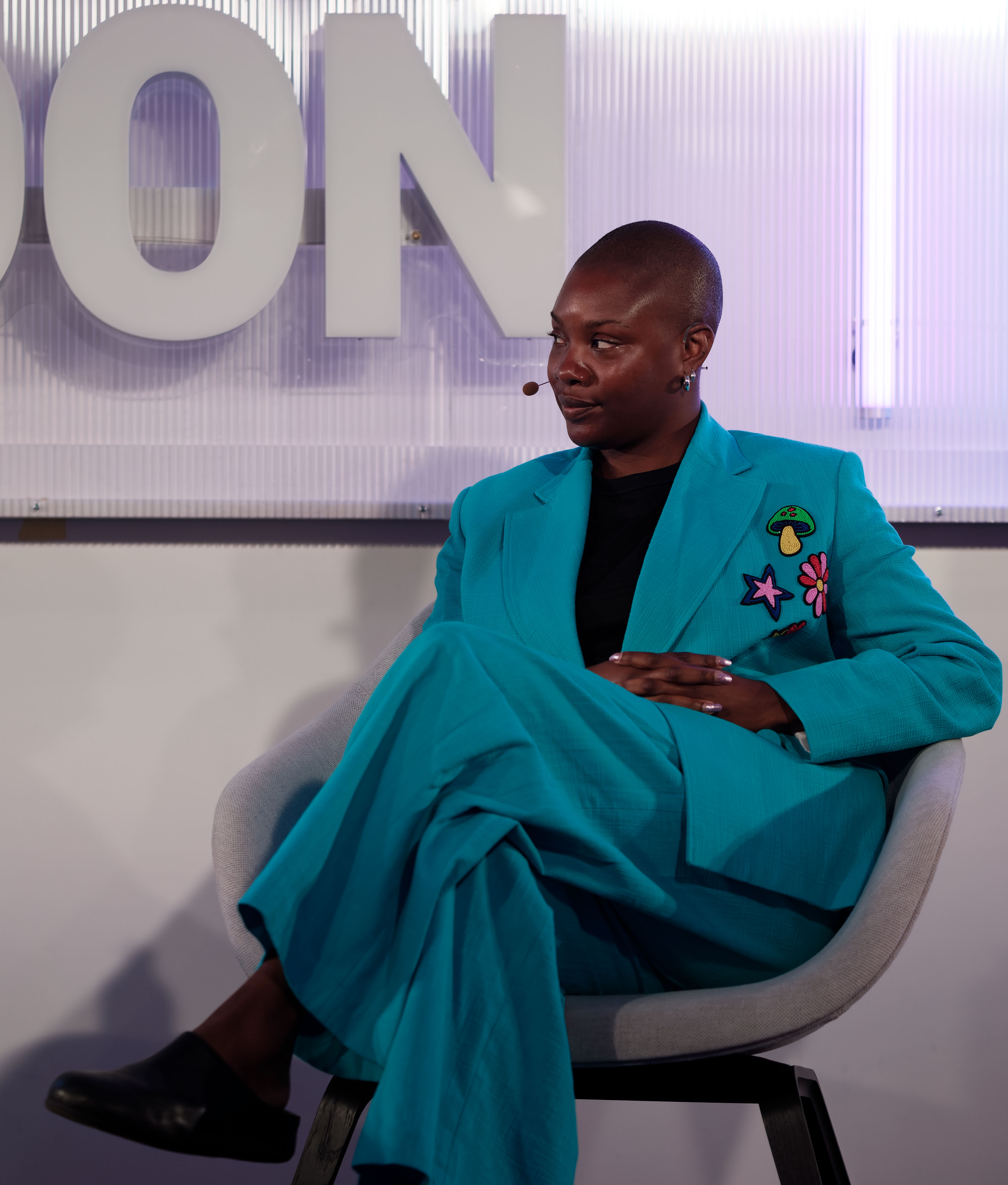
- Adegoke in 2026
- Born: 25 September 1991 (age 35); Croydon, South London, UK
- Education: University of Warwick
- Occupation: Journalist
- Writing career
- Notable work: Slay In Your Lane (2018)

Yomi Adegoke (born 25 September 1991) is a British journalist and author.

== Early life and education ==
Adegoke is of Nigerian heritage. She was born in Canning Town, east London, UK, and was raised in Croydon. She attended the University of Warwick and studied law. Her sister, Yemisi Adegoke, is a journalist for BBC Africa. She took a year out of university and in 2013 she founded Birthday Magazine, a publication aimed at black teenage girls. The magazine discussed race, pop culture and feminism.

== Career ==
Adegoke has written for The Guardian, The Independent and The Pool. She was selected by The Dots as a woman who was "redefining the creative industry". An Evening Standard feature included her among "frontline pioneers". She has called out racism on university campuses. She worked for Channel 4 News.

In a June 2019 essay published on Medium, Adegoke coined "The Disposable Black Girlfriend" trope, a concept that has since been widely adopted in media studies and cultural criticism to analyze tokenism and intersectional representation. It describes a recurring pattern in media where black women, often cast as girlfriends or love interests, are introduced only to serve as a temporary distraction from the protagonist's white "true love".

=== Slay in Your Lane ===
Adegoke collaborated with Elizabeth Uviebinené to write Slay in Your Lane: The Black Girl Bible. Nine publishers fought for the rights to the book, with Adegoke and Uviebinené winning five-figure sums. It was published by 4th Estate (HarperCollins) in 2018. It was described as a "guide to life for a generation of black women". To write the book, Adegoke and Uviebinené interviewed several accomplished black women, including Malorie Blackman, Denise Lewis, jamelia, Laura Mvula, Clara Amfo, Karen Blackett, June Sarpong, Margaret Busby and Estelle. The book covers work, education, money, dating and health, as well as media representation of black women. It was selected by BBC Radio 4 as Book of the Week in July 2018. They discussed the book at the Southbank Centre for the London Literature Festival. The pair have discussed the success of the book widely, in mainstream media and public discussions. Complementing the book, in April 2020 Adegoke and Uviebinené launched the Slay in Your Lane: The Podcast, which continued the analysis of news and popular culture topics from a black British female perspective.

=== The List ===
In 2023, Adegoke published her debut novel, The List, with 4th Estate books (an imprint of HarperCollins). The book follows internet famous couple Ola and Michael in the run up to their wedding, and how their relationship is affected when Michael's name is included on anonymously curated online list of abusers. The novel explores the gray areas of internet culture and accountability frameworks. It was shortlisted for the British Book Awards, as well as being selected as a Good Morning America book club choice. In 2023, it was announced that Adegoke would be creating and executive producing a TV adaptation of the book with HBO Max, the BBC and A24.
