= Gifted (novel) =

2007 book by Nikita Lalwani

- First edition
- Author: Nikita Lalwani
- Language: English
- Publisher: Viking Press
- Publication date: 2007
- Publication place: United Kingdom
- Media type: Print, Audio & eBook
- Pages: 288
- ISBN: 0-670-91707-9

Gifted is the debut novel by author Nikita Lalwani longlisted for the Man Booker Prize and shortlisted for the Costa First Novel Award. It was first published in 2007 by Viking.

== Plot introduction ==
The novel is set in the 1980s Cardiff where maths prodigy Rumi Vasi grows up with her Hindu parents. Subjected to her father's strict tutoring he is determined that she be accepted by Oxford University at the age of only fifteen. But on starting University she finds it hard to adapt to her new-found freedom.
