= Elizabeth Uviebinené =

British author

- Born: 27 April 1992 (age 34)
- Education: University of Warwick
- Occupation: Writer
- Writing career
- Notable work: Slay in Your Lane

Elizabeth Uviebinené is a British author and brand strategist. She is co-author of the 2018 book Slay in Your Lane.

== Education ==
Uviebinené is of Nigerian descent. She grew up in Peckham, south-east London. She studied at the University of Warwick, where she met her future best friend Yomi Adegoke.

== Career ==
Uviebinené was recognised by The Dots as a Woman Redefining the Creative Industry in 2018. Also in 2018 she won the WeAreTheCity Rising Star award. She featured on BBC Radio 6 Music's Black Power Season.

=== Slay in Your Lane ===
Slay in Your Lane, the Black Girl Bible was published by HarperCollins in July 2018. It discusses the challenges that black women face in a mainly white country. Uviebinené had the idea to write Slay in Your Lane in 2015, and contacted her friend Yomi Adegoke. She came up with the title for the book after a picture of Solange Knowles at fashion week surfaced, and Uviebinené texted it to Adegoke with the caption "SLAY IN YOUR LANE". The publishing rights were won by HarperCollins after a nine-way auction. The book was selected as Book of the Week by BBC Radio 4 in July 2018. In April 2020, Uviebinené and Adegoke launched the 'Slay in Your Lane: The Podcast' which covered news and popular culture topics discussed within the book.
