= Shuang Hu =

Australian actress

- 胡逸兴
- Education: Griffith University
- Occupation: Actress
- Years active: 2010–present

Shuang Hu (Chinese: 胡逸兴; pinyin: Hú Yìxìng) is a Chinese-born Australian actress. She is best known for portraying role as Candy Law in the SBS television series The Family Law, and Wei Jun in the ABC comedy series Ronny Chieng: International Student. Hu was the lead and co-writer of the 2024 Amazon Prime Video film Five Blind Dates.

== Early life and education ==
Hu was born in China, and moved with her family to Brisbane, Queensland when she was a child. She graduated with a bachelor's degree of Hotel Management and International Business from Griffith University.

== Career ==
From 2016 to 2019, Hu portrayed Candy Law in the SBS television series The Family Law, and from 2016 to 2017 she portrayed Wei Jun in the ABC comedy series Ronny Chieng: International Student. Hu had a starring role in (and was also a co-writer of) the 2024 Amazon Prime Video film Five Blind Dates. She presented the 2022 documentary Beyond the Reef, wherein she travelled to the Great Barrier Reef.

== Filmography ==
=== Film ===
Year	Title	Role	Notes
2017	All Summers End	Jen Wong	
2020	Miami Bici	Detective Jacky Lin	
2024	Five Blind Dates	Lia	Starring role, also Co-Writer

=== Television ===
Year	Title	Role	Notes
2016-2017	Ronny Chieng: International Student	Wei Jun	Main cast
2016-2019	The Family Law	Candy Law	Main cast
