= Sameer Rahim =

British journalist

Sameer Rahim is a British literary journalist and novelist. He became Managing Editor (Arts and Books) at Prospect magazine, having previously worked at the London Review of Books and at The Daily Telegraph, and his reviews of both fiction and non-fiction have featured regularly in other publications. Also an essayist, he was a winner of the William Hazlitt Essay Prize 2013 for "The Shadow of the Scroll: Reconstructing Islam's Origins". Rahim's critical writing includes pieces on V. S. Naipaul, Kazuo Ishiguro, Clive James and Geoffrey Hill.

== Career ==
After studying English at Pembroke College, Cambridge, where he edited the student newspaper, Rahim worked as a teacher before focusing on a career in literary journalism. He began his career with the London Review of Books in 2005, going on to work on the Books Desk at the Daily Telegraph and then Prospect Magazine, where he was Arts and Books Editor. In 2022, it was announced that in November Rahim would be joining The Bridge Street Press, an imprint of Little, Brown, as publisher.

He is the author of the 2019 novel Asghar and Zahra, published by John Murray. The New Statesman called the book "sparkling ... a novel of charm and compassion", and it was described in The Guardian as "a tender, pin-sharp portrait of a marriage and a community. ... a wonderful achievement; an invigorating reminder of the power fiction has to challenge lazy stereotypes, and stretch the reader’s heart", while The Telegraph reviewer concluded: "Elegant, provocative, and clear-eyed, this beautifully pitched novel asks new questions about what imagination means, and what it costs." Other positive reviews appeared in the TLS, the Literary Review, with Rahim being compared to Ian McEwan and Asghar and Zahra being singled out by Colm Tóibín as one of the books of the year.

Rahim has served as a judge for literary awards including the Forward Prize for Poetry, the Orwell Prize for Political Writing and the Costa Poetry Award, most recently being selected for the 2020 Booker Prize jury alongside Margaret Busby, Lee Child, Lemn Sissay and Emily Wilson.
