= Michael Donkor =

British author and English teacher (born 1985)

- Born: 1985 (age 40–41); London, England
- Education: University of Oxford; University of London
- Occupations: Teacher of English; Author
- Writing career
- Notable work: Hold (2018)

Michael Donkor (born 1985) is a British author and English teacher based in London. He is represented by Blake Friedmann and Fourth Estate.

== Early life and education ==
Donkor was born in 1985 in London to a Ghanaian household. He completed his bachelor's degree in English at Wadham College, Oxford, as well as a master's in Creative Writing at University of London. At the University of Oxford, he was one of only 21 black students in his year. At the University of London, he was supervised by Andrew Motion.

== Career ==
In 2010, Donkor trained as an English teacher at the UCL Institute of Education, and began his teaching career at Esher College. He formerly taught at St Paul's Girls' School. He left his job there by 2022 to pursue a writing career in Lisbon, Portugal. In 2014, he was chosen by the National Centre for Writing for their mentoring programme, through which he met mentor Daniel Hahn and agent Juliet Pickering. He was described by HarperCollins as a "powerful new British literary voice". The Observer selected him as a "New Face of Fiction" in January 2018. He is inspired by Zadie Smith, Chimamanda Ngozi Adichie and Toni Morrison.

He has written for outlets including The Guardian, The Telegraph, BBC Radio 3, the TLS and The Independent.

=== Hold ===
Fourth Estate gained publishing rights to Donkor's debut novel Hold, which was published in July 2018. It follows the stories of three teenage girls from Kumasi, Ghana, to Brixton, London, in 2002, and has been described as a coming-of-age novel. Donkor chose to set Hold in 2002 as it marks the summer when he was applying to study English at university. Hold was longlisted for the 2019 Dylan Thomas Prize. Among those who praised Donkor's work were Diana Evans, Jeffrey Boakye and Courttia Newland. Jackie Kay wrote: "Michael Donkor's brilliance is in the way he captures voices; his work has an immediacy and a warmth to it and his is a world you want to enter, whose characters spring vividly to life."
