= Waterstones 11 =

Literary award

The Waterstones 11
- Awarded for: 11-strong list of debut novels written in English
- Sponsored by: Waterstones
- Location: United Kingdom
- First award: 2011
- Final award: 2013
- Website: The Waterstones 11

The Waterstones 11 was a literary book prize aimed at promoting debut authors, run and curated by British bookseller Waterstones. It ran from 2011–13. The list of 11 authors are selected from a list of 100 authors submitted by publishers. The prize, established in 2011, has included Orange Prize winner Téa Obreht's novel The Tiger's Wife, Man Booker Prize nominee Pigeon English by Stephen Kelman and the winner of the Desmond Elliott Prize for New Fiction, The Land of Decoration by Grace McCleen.

== Winners ==
=== 2011 ===
The winners were announced on 20 January 2011:

- City of Bohane by Kevin Barry
- The Free World by David Bezmozgis
- The Registrar's Manual for Detecting Forced Marriages by Sophie Hardach
- 22 Britannia Road by Amanda Hodgkinson
- Chinaman: The Legend of Pradeep Mathew by Shehan Karunatilaka
- Pigeon English by Stephen Kelman - Shortlisted for 2011 Man Booker Prize
- The Coincidence Engine by Sam Leith
- The Tiger's Wife by Téa Obreht - Winner of the 2011 Orange Prize
- The Sentimentalists by Johanna Skibsrud
- The Collaborator by Mirza Waheed - Shortlisted for The Guardian First Book Prize
- When God Was a Rabbit by Sarah Winman - Winner of Edinburgh Book Festival Newton First Book Prize

=== 2012 ===
The winners were announced on 20 January 2012

- The Panopticon by Jenni Fagan
- Absolution by Patrick Flanery - Longlisted for The Guardian First Book Award
- Shelter by Frances Greenslade
- The Art of Fielding by Chad Harbach - Shortlisted for The Guardian First Book Award
- The Snow Child by Eowyn Ivey
- The Unlikely Pilgrimage of Harold Fry by Rachel Joyce - Longlisted for 2012 Man Booker Prize
- The Land of Decoration by Grace McCleen - Winner of the Desmond Elliott Prize for New Fiction
- Signs of Life by Anna Raverat
- The Lifeboat by Charlotte Rogan
- The Age of Miracles by Karen Thompson Walker
- Care of Wooden Floors by Will Wiles

=== 2013 ===
The winners were announced on 14 January 2013

- Pig's Foot by Carlos Acosta
- Idiopathy by Sam Byers
- Y by Marjorie Celona
- The Universe Versus Alex Woods by Gavin Extence
- Burial Rites by Hannah Kent
- The Fields by Kevin Maher
- The Son by Michel Rostain
- The Spinning Heart by Donal Ryan
- Marriage Material by Sathnam Sanghera
- Ghana Must Go by Taiye Selasi
- Ballistics by D. W. Wilson

== See also ==
- Waterstones Book of the Year
- Waterstones Children's Book Prize
- Waterstones Debut Fiction Prize
- Waterstones Children's Laureate
- Guardian First Book Award
