= The Strange Case of Jane O. =

2025 novel by Karen Thompson Walker

- First edition cover
- Author: Karen Thompson Walker
- Cover artist: Artem Hvozdkov
- Language: English
- Genres: Literary; Mystery; Speculative
- Publisher: Random House
- Publication date: February 25, 2025
- Publication place: United States
- Media type: Hardcover
- Pages: 288
- ISBN: 978-1-984-85394-3
- Dewey Decimal: 813/.6—dc23/eng/20240419
- LC Class: PS3623.A4366 S77 2025

The Strange Case of Jane O. is a 2025 literary mystery and speculative fiction novel by American writer Karen Thompson Walker. It was first published in February 2025 in the United States by Random House, an imprint of Penguin Random House. The book is about a New York City psychiatrist who treats a woman with mysterious blackouts and hallucinations.

== Background ==
Walker said that a book that shaped her writing career is The Man Who Mistook His Wife for a Hat and Other Clinical Tales, a 1985 non-fiction book by British neurologist, Oliver Sacks. Walker explained that Sacks' clinical case histories were so beyond belief they "shattered my own too-rigid sense of reality". This led to her enjoying "having my ... sense of reality temporarily demolished", which is one of the reasons the three novels she has written (Note: The Age of Miracles (2012), The Dreamers (2019) and The Strange Case of Jane O. (2025)) all lean towards speculative fiction. Walker stated that the idea for The Strange Case of Jane O. came from Sacks' book when she asked herself the question, "what if a doctor a little like Sacks were to meet a patient whose symptoms were so extraordinary that they could not be explained by any of the known causes?"

Walker described The Strange Case of Jane O. as "one part literary, one part speculative mystery". She said she conducted extensive research into the fields of memory, psychiatry and psychotherapy, and read numerous clinical case histories to ensure that the psychiatrist's voice in the book was credible.

== Plot summary ==
In 2018, New York City psychiatrist Dr. Henry Byrd is called to attend to a 38-year-old librarian who had blacked out in Prospect Park, Brooklyn with no idea as to why she was there. He refers to her as Jane O. and finds out that she is a single mother with a one-year-old son, Caleb. She tells him that prior to the blackout she had a vivid hallucination of a teenage friend, Nico, who had committed suicide in 1998. After a few sessions with Jane, Henry learns that she has hyperthymesia, a very rare condition of an excessive memory for past events. Then Jane disappears, much to the distress of Henry and her mother. But a few weeks later, she is found in hospital, convinced that they are in the middle of a pandemic, that she has contracted the virus, and that Caleb has died. A police detective investigating Jane's disappearance finds discrepancies in her story and believes she is faking it. The doctors cannot find anything wrong with Jane, and Caleb is found alive and well. But Henry does not believe that Jane is lying, and diagnoses her as having dissociative fugue.

Jane's mother gives Henry letters she found that Jane had written to Caleb for him to read when he is older. In them Jane describes her experiences while in her fugue state. Henry reads that Jane believes that there is a worldwide pandemic caused by the Nipah virus, and that New York City is in lockdown. He also learns that during the lockdown, he conducted online therapy sessions with her. Henry is puzzled because there were no online sessions, and there is no pandemic. Henry discovers that the Nipah virus does exist, and had broken out in India in 1999, but was contained and had not spread to the rest of the world. Henry still does not believe that Jane is lying because her delusions are always "uncannily coherent". What Henry found disturbing was that her descriptions of his online sessions included details that she could not possibly have known about, in particular, briefly seeing his wife in the room, wearing clothes Henry recognized. Henry's wife had died several years ago.

In an attempt to explain this mystery, Henry suggests that Jane may be slipping into an alternate reality where the events she described actually took place. In her reality, Nico and Henry's wife are still alive, and there is a pandemic caused by the Nipah virus. When Jane surfaces from her fugue state, she is confused and asks why she is in hospital and where her son is. She has no memory of the events she had experienced while in the other reality, and tells Henry after reading her letters to Caleb, that "those words feel as if they were written by a stranger".

== Critical reception ==
British speculative fiction writer Nina Allan wrote in The Guardian that The Strange Case of Jane O. is an unexpected and engaging book. She found the science fiction elements "most satisfying", and the reveals towards the end "moving and unexpected". Allan stated that Walker's references to psychiatry and case histories "adds an extra dimension" to the story, but felt that Henry and Jane's characters were underdeveloped. She said that their backgrounds are not fully explored, making them "not only tricky to interpret, but difficult to know".

In a review in The New York Times, Leah Greenblatt described the book as a "quiet, cool-toned ... mystery", with elements of "soft sci-fi" and suggestions of the supernatural. She said that while Jane's flashbacks of her times with Nico "vibrate with the high-key hopes and anxieties of adolescence", Walker's character development of the present-day Jane "is less assured". Greenblatt added that "Henry and Jane have every reason to be serious and even somber people, [but] as protagonists they are often, alas, wet blankets." She criticized the "Wikipedia bits on psychiatry and semantics" that permeate the book, and the stock descriptions of New York City. Greenblatt stated that the novel's "slow-churn revelations" culminates in "an eerie, incomplete mood: a scrim of subdued intrigue, obscuring stranger things."

Reviewing the book in Strange Horizons, Jenny Hamilton described The Strange Case of Jane O. as "deeply felt yet unsentimental [and] thought-provoking without insisting on its answers". She called it "a pandemic novel that isn’t quite a pandemic novel, but still perfectly captures the bewilderment, mistrust, and uncertainty of our COVID era." A starred review at Kirkus Reviews stated that The Strange Case of Jane O. starts off quietly, then turns into "an exhilarating and riveting must-read". It said the narrators are unreliable, but not wrong, and the ending is "satisfyingly disturbing". Another starred review at Publishers Weekly described the book as "an alluring vision of how personal history and memory intertwine", adding that it is "tough to shake". Emily Bowles at the Library Journal recommended the book to fans of "literary fiction with an edge of psychological mystery", particularly the works of Emily St. John Mandel and Jennifer Cody Epstein.

== Works cited ==
- Walker, Karen Thompson (2025a). The Strange Case of Jane O. (ebook ed.). Random House. ISBN 978-1-984853-95-0.
