= Inland (Obreht novel) =

Novel by Téa Obreht

- First edition cover
- Author: Téa Obreht
- Audio read by: Anna Chlumsky, Edoardo Ballerini and Euan Morton
- Language: English
- Set in: Arizona Territory in 1893
- Publisher: Random House
- Publication date: August 13, 2019
- Publication place: United States
- Media type: Print (hardcover)
- Pages: 384
- ISBN: 978-0-8129-9286-1
- OCLC: 1075528426
- Dewey Decimal: 813/.6
- LC Class: PS3615.B73 I55 2019

Inland is the second novel by the Serbian American author Téa Obreht. The book was published by Random House on August 13, 2019, eight years after Obreht's 2011 debut novel, The Tiger's Wife.

== Plot ==
The novel follows two parallel narratives in the American frontier.

Living in the lawless, drought-ridden lands of the Arizona Territory in 1893, 37-year-old frontierswoman Nora Lark waits inside her home for the return of the men in her life. Nora's husband, Emmett, left in search of water for the household, and their two elder sons left following an explosive argument. Nora lives with her youngest son, who is convinced that a mysterious beast is stalking the land surrounding their home. She also lives with Emmett's mother, Missus Harriet, as well as Emmett's cousin, Josie, a clairvoyant who hosts séances to communicate with the dead. Nora, affected by her loneliness and isolation, speaks to her long-dead daughter, Evelyn, who died of heat stroke in Arizona as a baby.

Lurie Mattie, an immigrant Muslim from a Balkan piece of the Ottoman Empire, is a former outlaw and a man haunted by ghosts. He is able to see lost souls who want something from him, and he acquires their "wants". Lurie finds reprieve from the soul's longing in an unexpected relationship with Burke, a dromedary camel from the United States Camel Corps. However, Lurie is being pursued by a marshal on a charge of manslaughter and he takes cover in the Camel Corps. They are led by the camel driver Hi Jolly (aka Hadji Ali), a Turk of Syrian-Greek descent and a convert to Islam. Lurie travels with Burke in the Camel Corps on a westward trek from Texas.

== Reception ==
The novel debuted at number twelve on The New York Times hardcover fiction bestsellers list on September 1, 2019.

Ron Charles of The Washington Post praised the novel, writing, "The unsettling haze between fact and fantasy in Inland is not just a literary effect of Obreht's gorgeous prose; it's an uncanny representation of the indeterminate nature of life in this place of brutal geography." Writing in The New York Times Book Review, Chanelle Benz stated, "Obreht's simple but rich prose captures and luxuriates in the West's beauty and sudden menace. Remarkable in a novel with such a sprawling cast, Obreht also has a poetic touch for writing intricate and precise character descriptions."

Writing for the Los Angeles Times, Carolyn Kellogg gave the novel a mixed review, praising the characters of Lurie and Burke but lamented, "It's unfortunate that among all the varied characters we meet in Inland, Native Americans don't ever leave the periphery. It's a missed opportunity. At times, this sweeping story seems almost too big for even a writer of Obreht's gifts."

Lily Meyer of NPR celebrated the novel, writing, "Inland is a classic story, told in a classic way — and yet it feels wholly and unmistakably new." The reviewer concludes, "Obreht offers a new representation of the West, both in the characters she chooses and the emotional rigor and range with which she writes. The result is at once a new Western myth and a far realer story than many we have previously received — and that's even with all the ghosts."
