= Offstage Theatre UK =

Theatre company in London

Offstage Theatre (UK) is "an enterprising young theatre company", based in Waltham Forest, London, run by Artistic Director and Producer Cressida Brown. The company's first piece was Home, written by Gbolahan Obisesan, Cressida Brown and Emily Randall in response to the demolition of the housing estate Beaumont Road. The site-responsive piece functioned as "a valuable document of a people and a place just moments before an irrevocable change". "The project, which overwhelmed the creative team with its success" established Offstage as a Site-specific theatre company.

In 2015, Offstage Theatre was announced as recipients of the Kevin Spacey Artists of Choice Program. With KSF's support, they returned to Beaumont to create the sequel to Home, Re:Home. The production was performed at The Yard in 2016 and was nominated for the 2016 Offies for Best Production and Best Ensemble.

Offstage has also staged a site-specific production of Macbeth in Paris to mark the 450th anniversary of Shakespeare's birthday. The production was featured on French news channel France 24, where director Cressida Brown and actor Florian Hutter were interviewed.

Other productions include Walking The Tightrope, ten five-minute plays exploring censorship in the arts, longlisted for Amnesty Scotland's Freedom of Expression Award. "Tricky, dangerous, stimulating, discomfiting – what serious theatre is for, in other words"., it was first shown at Theatre Delicatessen with the following plays:

- Tickets are now on sale by Caryl Churchill
- Please Forgive Us Whoever You Are by Ryan Craig
- Sun City by April De Angelis
- Beyond the Fringe by Tim Fountain
- A Bond of Love by Hannah Khalil
- Exhibit A by Neil LaBute
- Acting Towards the Promotion of Peace by Sarah Solemani
- Faust for Kids by Hattie Naylor
- Re:Exhibit by Gbolahan Obisesan
- Old Newland by Julia Pascal
- Band Wagon by Evan Placey
- What Are We Going To Do About Harry? by Mark Ravenhill

In August 2015, Walking the Tightrope transferred to the Underbelly for the Edinburgh Fringe Festival, with two new commissioned works from Omar El-Khairy and Timberlake Wertenbaker; it was pick of the festival for both The Scotsman and The New York Times.

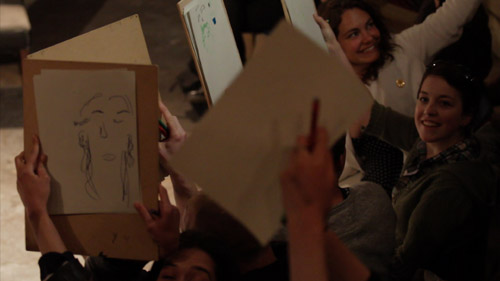
Drawing Play at The Yard, June 2013

== Productions ==
- Re:Home The Yard (February 2016).
- Caught by Christopher Chen, Volta Festival, Arcola (September 2015). Nominated for the 2015 Offie for TBC
- Accidental Brummie Birmingham Rep (September 2015)
- Walking the Tightrope by Various, Underbelly at Edinburgh Fringe Festival (August 2015)
- Walking the Tightrope by Various, Theatre Delicatessen (January 2015)
- Macbeth by William Shakespeare in Association with Shakespeare & Co, Bard-En-Seine Festival, Paris (2014).
- Drawing Play by Cressida Brown and the company, at The Yard, Hackney Wick (2013).
- For Theatre Uncut: The Price by Lena Kitsopoulou (Greece); The Birth of my Violence from Marco Canale (Spain); Pine by Clara Brennan (UK), New York Theatre Row (NY) (2012).
- Amphibians by Steve Waters, in an abandoned swimming pool (2011). One of '2011 Ones to Watch' in The Guardian and described by Susannah Clapp in The Observer as "For once a production has earned the description 'site-specific'" Nominated for the 2011 Offies: Best New Play, Best Director, Best Set Designer, Best Sound Designer, Best Lighting Designer, Best Choreographer.
- Scum in Trinity Buoy Wharf, site of London’s only lighthouse; part of CETT Fellowship (2009).
- Rosencrantz and Guildenstern are Dead by Tom Stoppard in association with the Royal Shakespeare Company, Novello Theatre (2009).
- Phaedra by Jean Racine, in the ruins of Craigmillar Castle, Edinburgh Festival (2007). Nominated for the Three Weeks Editors Award
- Home by Cressida Brown, Ghobolan Obeisan and Emily Randall, in the vacated St Catherine's tower block on the Beaumont Road Estate in East London (2006).
