= The Morningside =

2024 novel by Téa Obreht

- First edition cover
- Author: Téa Obreht
- Audio read by: Carlotta Brentan
- Cover artist: Nana An
- Language: English
- Genre: Magical realism, dystopian fiction
- Publisher: Random House (US); Weidenfeld & Nicolson (UK)
- Publication date: March 19, 2024 (US); April 11, 2024 (UK)
- Publication place: United States; United Kingdom
- Media type: Print (hardcover), ebook, audiobook
- Pages: 287 pp. (hardcover 1st ed.)
- ISBN: 9781984855503 (hardcover 1st ed.)
- OCLC: 1373342741
- Dewey Decimal: 813/.6
- LC Class: PS3615.B73 M67 2024

The Morningside is the third novel by American writer Téa Obreht. It was published on March 19, 2024 by Penguin Random House.

== Premise ==
The novel centers on Silvia, a young girl in the near future who lives with her mother and aunt in The Morningside, a deteriorating high rise in a semi-abandoned city. She endeavors to learn more about the building, the city, and the past.

== Background ==
In 2020, a short story by Obreht called "The Morningside" was published by The New York Times Magazine.

The full novel was released in Spring 2024. It is her first since Inland in 2019.

== Release ==
The novel was released in the United States on March 19, 2024 in hardcover format along with a large print paperback edition. The cover art was produced by Nana An.

An ebook and electronic audiobook were published on the same day. A physical CD version was published March 26, 2024 as well. The novel is narrated by Carlotta Brentan.

An international edition was published in paperback, while Weidenfeld & Nicolson released a paperback and kindle version in UK.

Released date	Country	Language	Publisher	Format	ISBN/ASIN	Pages
March 19, 2024	US	English	Penguin Random House	1st ed. hardcover	ISBN 9781984855503	287 pp
March 19, 2024	US	English	Penguin Random House	1st ed. large print paperback	ISBN 9780593861851	368 pp
March 19, 2024	US	English	Penguin Random House	ebook	ISBN 9781984855510	—
March 19, 2024	US	English	Penguin Random House	audiobook	ISBN 9780593823972	517 min
March 19, 2024	US	English	Penguin Random House	Kindle	ASIN B0C8MJHNWR	—
March 19, 2024	US	English	Penguin Random House	International Edition, paperback	ISBN 9780593732694	304 pp
March 26, 2024	US	English	Penguin Random House	CD	ISBN 9780593824139	510 min
March 26, 2024	UK	English	Weidenfeld & Nicolson, an imprint of Orion Publishing Group	1st ed. paperback	ISBN 9781399619905	304 pp
March 26, 2024	UK	English	Weidenfeld & Nicolson, an imprint of Orion Publishing Group	Kindle	ASIN B0CKVN291H	—
April 11, 2024	UK	English	Weidenfeld & Nicolson, an imprint of Orion Publishing Group	1st ed. hardcover	ISBN 9781399619899	304 pp

== Reception ==
The novel garnered mostly positive reception.

Writing in The New York Times, author Jessamine Chan noted the "subtle beauty and precision of Obreht’s prose" and praised the novel for "forcing us to reckon with the ruined world that future generations will inherit". In a starred review, Kirkus Reviews called the novel, "a captivating blend of science fiction and magical realism with a wonderfully engaging protagonist."

== Awards ==
Year	Award	Category	Result	Ref.
2024	Joyce Carol Oates Literary Prize	—	Longlisted	
2025	Climate Fiction Prize	—	Pending^{Shortlisted}	
