= The Age of Miracles (disambiguation) =

The Age of Miracles is a 2012 novel by Karen Thompson Walker.

The Age of Miracles may refer to:

- The Age of Miracles (album), a 2010 album by Mary Chapin Carpenter
- The Age of Miracles, a 2009 book by Marianne Williamson
- The Age of Miracles (film), a 1996 film directed by Peter Chan
- Age of Miracles, originally The Day of the Star Cities, a 1973 science fiction novel by John Brunner
