= Beaumont Road =

Housing estate in Leyton, London

Coordinates: 51°34′19″N 0°00′40″W

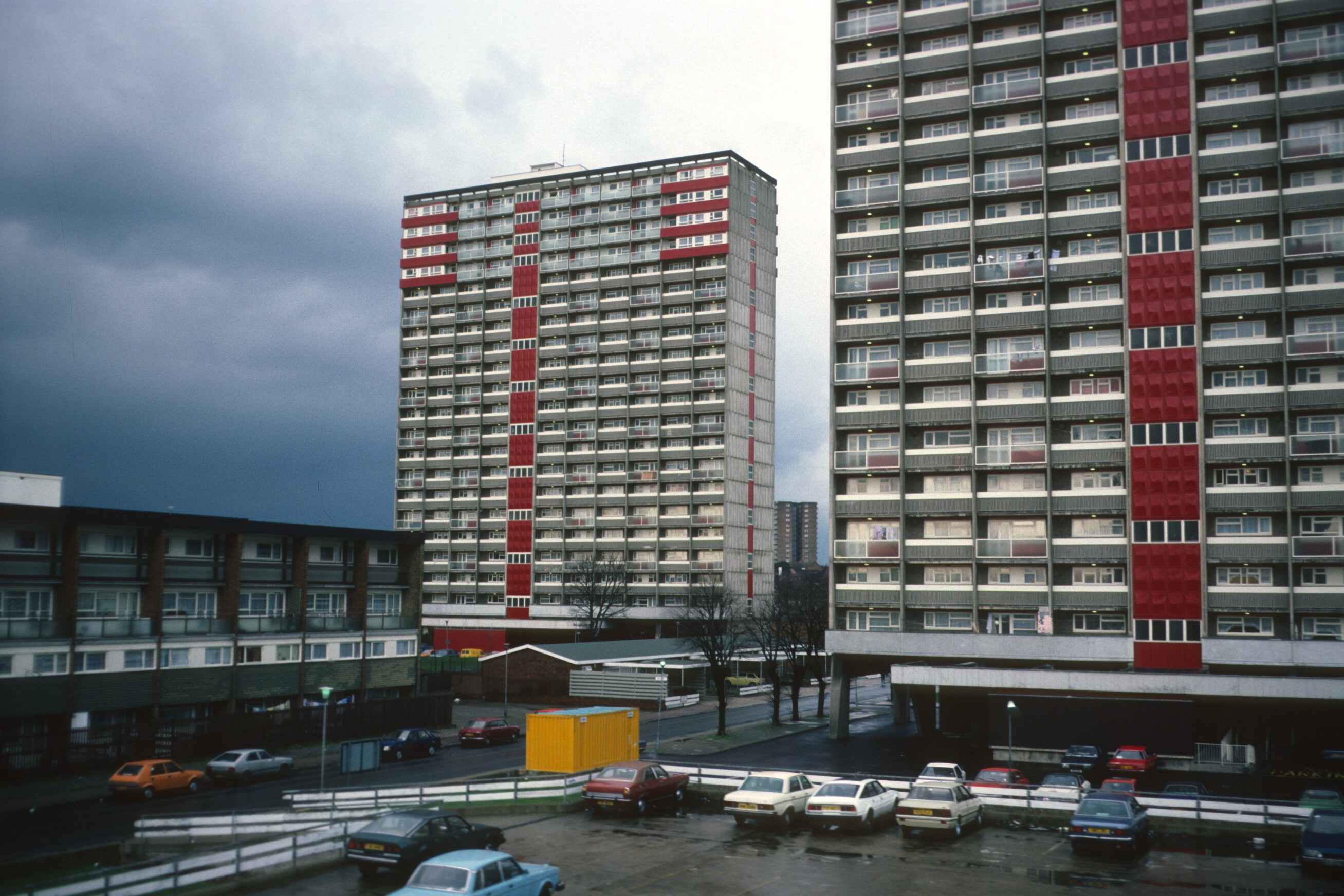
- Interactive map of Beaumont Road

General information
- Location: Leyton
- Population: 4,490
- No. of units: 898

Construction
- Constructed: 1963-66 (Post-war)
- Style: Modernist

Refurbishment
- Proposed action: Demolition
- Refurbished: 2006

Beaumont Road is a housing estate located in Leyton in East London. It is the largest housing estate in the borough of Waltham Forest. It is situated just south of the Bakers Arms, on Leyton High Road.

== Original development ==
The Beaumont Road Estate was built in two stages. Stage 1, approved in 1963, consisted of one 20-storey tower (containing 120 flats) called All Saints' Tower, while an extension to Stage 1 approved in 1965 consisted of another 20-storey tower (containing 120 flats) called St Paul's Tower. Stage 2, approved in 1966, consisted of one 20-storey tower (containing 120 flats) called St Catherine's Tower Altogether (containing 360 flats). In addition 23 low rise blocks (containing 538 flats) were also approved in 1966. Beaumont road also contained many elderly homes, Victorian houses and bungalows. Beaumont road when completed contained; three tower blocks, twenty-three low rise blocks, bungalows, homes for the elderly, shops and a community center. Complete with 898 flats with a population of 4,490.

The original estate comprised:

- All Saints Tower
- St Cathrine's Tower
- St Paul's Tower
- St Thomas Court
- St Elizabeth Court
- St Edward's Court
- St Josephs Court
- St Mathews Court
- St Mark's Court
- St Lukes Court
- Flack Court
- Emanuel Court
- Ayerst Court
- Muriel Court
- Russel Court
- Osbourne Court
- Howell Court
- Kings Close
- Dare Court
- Staton Court
- Shelly Court
- Emmanuel Court
- Atkinson Court
- Shop Court

With

- Beaumont bungalows
- Beaumont House
- Beaumont Primary school
- Beaumont newsagents
- Beaumont Community centre
- Beaumont Cyber centre
- Leyton Community support centre
- The Six Bells pub

== Redevelopment ==
Demolition of the original Beaumont road housing, including the three towers, began during early 2006. The estate was redeveloped as part of a regeneration programme which cost over £40 million.

What has replaced the 40-year-old estate are a series of "squares and neighbourhoods around a central, tree-lined avenue on Beaumont Road and reinstated the road's pre-war route.". Some of the squares are on the sites of the original towers. A total of 306 new properties were built in three phases during the project, of which some are social housing.

The towers themselves dominated the skyline in and around Bakers Arms and their demolition left Waltham Forest with only one remaining social housing high-rise over 20 floors, Northwood Tower. This is down from a peak of 20 in 1971.

== Media ==
Home was the first production of site-specific theatre company Offstage Theatre UK and received media coverage on TV with news reports on Channel 4, ITN, BBC London as well as national and international papers. Directed by Cressida Brown, Home was performed promenade in St Catherine's Tower prior to its demolition in January 2006. The play text was inspired by interviews with the residents on the estate while Flat 14 on the 9th floor was designed with installations of found objects as well as the competition pictures of the local primary children, painted murals of the early teen crews, and graffiti of local tagger Edge. It was written by Gbolahan Obisesan to give the community of Beaumont estate a chance to "document what the area means to them." Rap, video projections of climbing the towers and acted scenes were used to recount stories of life in Beaumont in one flat in the tower with the audience moving from room to room to follow the story.
