= How a Woman Becomes a Lake =

2020 novel by Marjorie Celona

- First edition
- Author: Marjorie Celona
- Language: English
- Published: 2020
- Publisher: Hamish Hamilton
- Publication place: Canada
- Pages: 272
- ISBN: 978-0735235823

How a Woman Becomes a Lake is a 2020 novel by Marjorie Celona.

Set in the small fishing town of Whale Bay, it deals with childhood, familial bonds, new beginnings, and costly mistakes.

The novel was a shortlisted finalist for the Crime Writers of Canada Award for Best Novel in 2021.
