= Gavin Extence =

English writer

- Born: 1982 (age 43–44); Swineshead, Lincolnshire, England
- Occupation: Writer
- Writing career
- Genre: Novels
- Notable awards: Waterstones 11 (2013)

Gavin Extence (born 1982) is an English writer. Extence won the Waterstones 11 literary prize for his first book The Universe Versus Alex Woods (2013). He has a PhD in Film studies, is married, has a daughter and is also a keen chess player.

The Universe Versus Alex Woods is Extence's début novel and is "the everyday tale of a teenage science nerd hit by a meteorite who strikes up a friendship with a pot-smoking Vietnam veteran". It is the story of wilful teenager Alex, who acquires a fascination with science and astronomy after being struck by a falling meteorite and going into a coma. After recovering, Alex forms an unusual friendship with an aged, dope-smoking Vietnam veteran, the reclusive Mr. Peterson, who is a dedicated aficionado of Kurt Vonnegut.

His second book The Mirror World of Melody Black was released in 2015 and follows a young girl's descent into mental illness.

En 2023, il écrit Finding Phoebe le quotidien du jeune fille diagnostiqué autiste qui aime sa routine mais aui va devoir sortir de sa zone de confort pour aider sa meilleure amie en grande détresse. Il "parle d'amour, d'acceptation de soi et des autres et du passage à l'âge adulte". Extence a écrit ce livre pour sa fille.
