= The Land of Decoration =

2012 novel by Grace McCleen

- First edition
- Author: Grace McCleen
- Cover artist: Eleni Kalorkoti
- Language: English
- Publisher: Chatto & Windus (UK)
- Publication date: 1 March 2012
- Publication place: United Kingdom
- Media type: Print
- Pages: 304
- Awards: Betty Trask Award; Desmond Elliott Prize
- ISBN: 0-7011-8681-X

The Land of Decoration is the debut novel by British author Grace McCleen published in 2012 by Chatto & Windus. It won the Desmond Elliott Prize in 2012 and the Betty Trask Award in 2013. It was chosen along with three American novels by The Sunday Times Literary Editor as one of the four most promising debuts of 2012. It became one of Waterstones 11, an Oprah favourite, has so far been translated into nineteen languages and was selected by the Richard and Judy Book Club. It has been optioned by Life of Pi producer Gil Netter to be adapted by Kelly Marcel.

== Plot introduction ==
The story is about ten-year-old Judith, who lives with her father John in a small town, as members of a fundamentalist sect they warn their neighbours of the approaching armageddon. Motherless and bullied at school Judith seeks escape in her bedroom where she has recreated the town as an elaborate model, which she calls the 'Land of Decoration', a phrase she takes from Ezekiel 20. She wonders if she makes it snow in her miniature world whether she can prevent school from opening. The next morning the October landscape outside her window is blanketed in white. This is just the first of her miracles, but with her power comes trouble as her father's work-colleagues come out on strike and the bullying at school intensifies.

== Inspiration ==
Speaking of her childhood in Wales, McCleen says "I grew up in a fundamentalist religion and didn’t have much contact with non-believers. My parents weren’t typical converts so we didn’t have much contact with other believers either. When I was ten I was taken out of school and we moved to the country [Ireland]. I spent all the time in the fields with two sheepdogs, or making things in my room".

== Reception ==
- Nicola Barr in The Guardian writes, "McCleen's debut has rightly been much anticipated, not least because the author grew up in a similarly fundamentalist environment and the authenticity of the experience is part of what makes the book – and its astonishing young heroine – so memorable...this young writer has done a brave, bold thing, writing what is effectively a religious allegory set in the mid-80s Welsh valleys. The community she depicts truly has an end-of-the-world feel – it is aggressive and hostile, full of chaotic, deprived households, a nightmarish vision of strikes and riots and bullying" and concludes "Surprising, affecting, thoughtful and complex, McCleen's novel grows in power the more time you spend with it, and marks her out as a writer to watch."
- Amity Gaige in The New York Times calls it a 'gripping' and 'philosophically sophisticated' work, and explains "The success of Judith’s first miracle sets off a series of domino miracles, all of which occur under the novel’s slow-gathering and persuasive examination of a child’s crisis of faith...Judith summons what she believes is the voice of God...This novel builds interesting uncertainties into its narrative: Is Judith capable of dark magic, or are the events in her life coincidence? Is the wrathful voice inside her somewhere in the realm of imaginary friendship, or is she schizophrenic? McCleen never tips her hat."
- Chris Cleave wrote of The Land of Decoration in the Financial Times, "...loveable, unique and thrillingly uncategorisable...an allegory disguised as a sermon, the simulation of a partial autobiography, an impersonation of a heart-breaking psychological analysis of loneliness standing in for a useful self-help book, all the while posing as a brilliant page-turning story...an extraordinary and peculiarly haunting novel."
