= Jenni Fagan =

Scottish novelist and poet (born 1977)

Dr Jenni Fagan FRSL
- Born: September 1977 (age 48); Scotland
- Education: BA, University of Greenwich; MA, Royal Holloway, University of London; PhD, University of Edinburgh
- Occupations: Novelist, poet, screenwriter.
- Writing career
- Notable work: The Panopticon
- Notable awards: Gordon Burn Prize 2025, Sunday Herald Culture Awards Scottish Author of the Year 2016, Granta Best of Young British Novelist 2013
- Website: jennifagan.com

Dr Jenni Fagan FRSL (born 1977) is a Scottish novelist and poet. She has published five fiction books including novel The Panopticon, screenplays, eight books of poetry and a memoir, Ootlin. She was named Scottish writer of the year 2016 by The Glasgow Herald. In 2023, she was elected a Fellow of the Royal Society of Literature.

== Early life ==
Fagan was born in 1977 and grew up in Scotland within the Scottish Local Authority care system. As a child she was adopted twice but neither placement worked out well. She spent six years living on a caravan park, and states that while she was a child she moved 26 times. After leaving the care system, Fagan was homeless for several years, living in homeless accommodation.

In 2007, she received the Dewar Arts award, which enabled her to attend Norwich School of Art and Design, going on to read for a BA at University of Greenwich, from which she graduated first class. She went on to study for an MA at Royal Holloway, University of London, where she was taught by Andrew Motion. In 2020, Fagan was awarded a PhD in Creative Writing by the University of Edinburgh. Her PhD supervisor was Dr Alan Gillis.

== Career ==
With the publication of her first novel in 2013, Fagan was listed by Granta as one of the 2013 Granta Best Young British Novelists. The Panopticon was well received in the press, with The New York Times describing her writing by saying: "...there is no resisting the tidal rollout of Fagan's imagery. Her prose beats behind your eyelids..." and also describing Fagan as The Patron Saint of Literary Street Urchins."

Her second novel, The Sunlight Pilgrims released in 2016, tells the story of a transgender young girl named Stella who lives on a caravan park and is based around the relationships she forms while growing up, set against a backdrop of rural Scotland during a period of freezing climate change. Writer Ben Myers described it as "prose that sparkles from the first page."

Fagan was shortlisted for the BBC National Short Story Award in 2017 with The Waken.

Fagan mentors young writers and works with young people, including offenders and those in the prison system. She curated an art exhibition at Tramway in Glasgow entitled Narrative for Koestler Trust in 2017. It showcased artwork by prisoners, young offenders and those in secure psychiatric care from across Scotland.

In 2017, as part of the Edinburgh International Book Festival, Fagan and four other Scottish writers took part in the Outriders Project, which involved taking road trips across the continent of America with local writers to explore partnerships while writing and blogging throughout the journey. Fagan's journey entailed travelling from the Rust Belt to Silicon Valley where she explored "questions on the nature of truth." She was accompanied by American novelist Bonnie Jo Campbell. The subsequent novel length poem called Truth was published by Tangerine Press in Autumn 2019.

During a writing residency at Shakespeare and Company in Paris Fagan wrote some of the poetry which made up her poetry collection There’s a Witch in the Word Machine. She has also been Writer in Residence at the University of Edinburgh, Lewisham Hospital's neonatal unit, Norfolk Blind Association, and has collaborated with a women's prison and various youth organisations over many years. She was a Robert Louis Stevenson Fellow at Grez-sur-Loing for a month in 2018, supported by The Scottish Book Trust. She also curated an exhibition of prisoner's work from all across the UK at The Tramway in Glasgow for the Koestler Trust, in 2017.

Fagan directed her first short film in 2018, a cine-poem about Bangour Village Hospital where she was born. She has also experimented with other media such as sculpture when she created a giant metal scold's bridle onto which she engraved words by women prisoners from the UK and USA, including submissions from women on death row. She went on to write and direct a short film, Heart of Glass, in 2022 for BBC Four.

In October 2024 Fagan travelled to Wellington, New Zealand, for the inaugural Island to Island exchange. Her exchange partner was the poet and visual artist essa may ranapiri. In the same year, she was commissioned by The Macallan distillery to write a series of poems to commemorate the distillery's 200th anniversary. These were combined with artworks by Catalan artist Javi Aznarez in a travelling exhibition and limited-edition book.

== Adaptations ==
It was reported in May 2022 that the production company, Buccaneer Scotland, had made a deal with Fagan to take options to film her novels The Panopticon and Luckenbooth for television. The same report noted that she had been contracted to write the screenplay for a TV version of Irvine Welsh's novel The Blade Artist.

== Awards and nominations ==
Year	Title	Award	Category	Result	Ref.
2010	The Dead Queen of Bohemia	3:AM Awards	Poetry Book of the Year	Won	
2012	The Panopticon	Waterstones 11	—	Won	
2013	The Panopticon	Desmond Elliott Prize	—	Shortlisted	
2013	The Panopticon	James Tait Black Memorial Prize	Fiction	Shortlisted	
2016	The Sunlight Pilgrims	Saltire Society Literary Awards	Fiction Book of the Year	Shortlisted	
2016	The Sunlight Pilgrims	Sunday Herald Culture Awards	Scottish Author of the Year	Won	
2017	The Sunlight Pilgrims	Encore Award	—	Shortlisted	
2017	"The Waken"	BBC National Short Story Award	—	Shortlisted	
2025	Ootlin	Gordon Burn Prize	—	Won	
2025	Ootlin	Women's Prize	Women's Prize for Non-Fiction	Longlisted	

In addition to the awards for specific works, Fagan was named in the 2013 Granta list of Best Young British Novelists

== Works ==
=== Novels ===
- —— (2012). The Panopticon. London: William Heinemann. ISBN 978-1448106325.
- —— (2016). The Sunlight Pilgrims. London: William Heinemann. ISBN 978-0434023301.
- —— (2021). Luckenbooth. London: William Heinemann. ISBN 978-0434023318.
- —— (2022). Hex. Edinburgh: Polygon. ISBN 978-0434023318.
- —— (2026). The Delusions. London: Hutchinson Heinemann. ISBN 978-1529153095.

=== Non-Fiction ===
- —— (2023). Ootlin. London: Penguin Books. ISBN 978-1804942147.

=== Poetry ===
- —— (2009). Urchin Belle. London: Blackheath Books. ISBN 978-1906099183.
- —— (2010). The Dead Queen of Bohemia. London: Blackheath Books. ISBN 978-1-906099-23-7.
- —— (2016). The Dead Queen of Bohemia: New & Collected Poems. Edinburgh: Polygon. ISBN 978-1846973390.
- —— (2018). There's A Witch in the Word Machine. Edinburgh: Polygon. ISBN 978-1788851046.
- —— (2019). Truth. London: Tangerine Press. ISBN 978-1910691441.
- —— (2022). The Bone Library. Edinburgh: Polygon. ISBN 978-1846975929.
- —— (2024). A Swan's Neck on the Butcher's Block. Edinburgh: Polygon. ISBN 978-1846976766.
- —— (2024). The Heart of The Spirit. Craigellachie, Moray: The Macallan.

=== Short stories ===
- —— (2012). IMPILO/The Acid Burn No Face Man. London: Bottle of Smoke Press. ISBN 978-1937073275.
