= Y (novel) =

2012 novel by Marjorie Celon

- Author: Marjorie Celona
- Language: English
- Genre: Literary fiction
- Publisher: Hamish Hamilton
- Publication date: 1 August 2012
- Publication place: Canada
- Media type: Print
- ISBN: 9780670066377

Y is the debut novel of American Canadian writer Marjorie Celona. It was published in 2012 by Hamish Hamilton.

== Plot ==
Shortly after being born on Vancouver Island, Shannon is abandoned in front of a YMCA and discovered by Vaughn, an exercise fiend who has arrived at the YMCA before it's opened. Shannon is moved to a few foster homes before finally being adopted by a single mother named Miranda who had a daughter, Lydia-Rose. Though Miranda tries to be a good parent to Shannon, Shannon feels like an outsider in her relationship with both of them. As she grows older, she developed amblyopia in one of her eyes, causing it to go blind. Shannon was a constant victim of bullying due to her strange looks, which pushed her to run away from Vancouver, only to be brought by the police. Shannon begins to search for her birth parents, encountering Vaughn along the way.

With the help of a social worker, Shannon is able to contact a man, Harrison Church, whom she believes is her biological father. After contacting him through a letter, Shannon learns that she was born the day after her half-brother, Eugene, died after ingesting a mixture of cough-syrup and cocaine while Harrison and her mother, Yula, were off getting high in the woods. Not wanting her daughter to know about the things she and Harrison have done, Yula abandoned Shannon in front of the YMCA, knowing that she would have to give up custody of her child anyway after her son's death.

== Awards ==
Y won the Waterstones 11 literary prize and was a shortlisted nominee for the Center for Fiction First Novel Prize, the Amazon.ca First Novel Award and a longlisted nominee for the Scotiabank Giller Prize.

== Reception ==
Claudia Ballard, from WME Entertainment reviewed the book for Publishers Weekly writing "while Shannon’s story might offer hope for anyone involved in a nontraditional family, Yula’s story is more compelling."

While Kirkus Reviews commended the author stating "Celona writes movingly about basic questions of identity, questions exacerbated by the unhappy circumstances of Shannon’s birth."
