= Man on Fire (Kelman novel) =

2015 novel by Stephen Kelman

- First edition
- Author: Stephen Kelman
- Language: English
- Subject: Bibhuti Bhushan Nayak
- Set in: India
- Published: 2015 (Bloomsbury Publishing)
- Publication place: United Kingdom
- Media type: print
- Pages: 296
- ISBN: 978-1408865460
- OCLC: 911550441
- Dewey Decimal: 823.92
- LC Class: PR6111.E524 M36

Man on Fire is a 2015 novel by English author Stephen Kelman and his second novel. The work was published on 13 August 2015 through Bloomsbury and is set in India. It is a fictional biography of Bibhuti Bhushan Nayak, a multiple Guinness and Limca record holder from Mumbai.

Kelman was inspired to write the book after watching a documentary about India where the English comedian Paul Merton kicked Nayak in the groin in an attempt to set a Limca World Record for the number of times being kicked in the groin.

== Plot ==
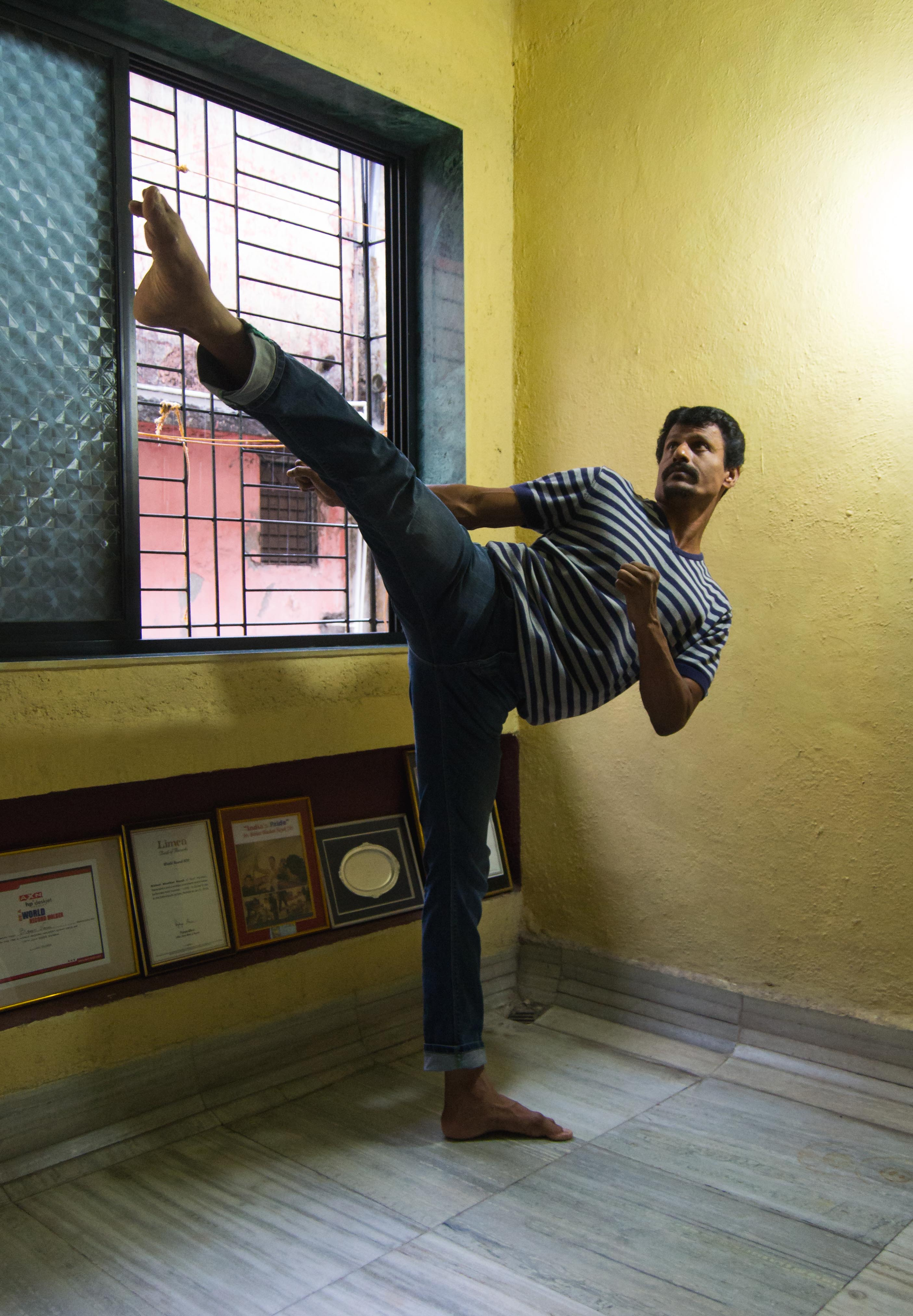
Bibhuti Bhushan Nayak, the protagonist of the Book Man on Fire

=== Summary ===
The novel follows Nayak and John Lock, an Englishman that has been diagnosed with terminal cancer. He has left his life and spouse behind in order to elope to India under the pretense of committing suicide. Once in India he meets Nayak and decides to help the man break the world record for breaking the most baseball bats on his shin bone.

Ultimately, John's wife Ellen tracks him down in India and there is a confrontation between the two.

== Reception ==
Critical reception has been positive and the Financial Times has called the book an "enthralling novel by a writer of considerable talent". The novel has also received praise from multiple reviewers with The Guardian, with both praising it for its humor.

The Washington Post commends the book for being "smartly arranged".
