= The Dreamers (novel) =

2019 novel by Karen Thompson Walker

- First edition cover
- Author: Karen Thompson Walker
- Audio read by: Cassandra Campbell
- Cover artist: Kurguzova (photo); Anna Kochman (design)
- Language: English
- Genre: Science fiction
- Set in: Santa Lora, California
- Publisher: Random House
- Publication date: January 15, 2019
- Publication place: United States
- Media type: Print (hardcover and paperback)
- Pages: 303 (hardcover)
- ISBN: 978-0-8129-9416-2 (hardcover)
- Dewey Decimal: 813/.6
- LC Class: PS3623.A4366 D74 2018

The Dreamers is a science-fiction novel by the American writer Karen Thompson Walker, published on January 15, 2019, by Random House. Walker's second novel details an ominous sleeping virus that sweeps over the fictional town, Santa Lora, in Southern California. The story follows a group of college students and families, and explores their experiences with everlasting sleep and heightened dreams.

The Dreamers has received mixed reviews from critics. The novel has been critiqued for its lack of characterisation and dramatic tension. However, it has also been praised for its lyrical prose and unique storyline. Walker has also been commended for the sentimental value that is embedded in her story.

== Background ==
Walker uses writing as a way to combat anxiety and fear for possible future disasters, which influenced her decision to write her first novel, The Dreamers as a psychological realism story. Walker spent five years thinking about the plot of her novel and conducting research into the logistics of sleep. Walker noted that one of her inspirations for the storyline came as a result of this intense process, as it made her realize how humans "haven't figured out why we sleep and dream." Walker claims that what interests her as a writer is how individuals react in situations of extreme disaster, a fascination that allowed her to consider what would happen if sleep became a contagious virus. Moreover, Walker claims that Kazuo Ishiguro’s novel Never Let Me Go, was a major inspiration that had an immense impact on the way she combined aspects of psychological and emotional realism with speculation. Ann Patchett’s novel Bel Canto, was another creative influence that helped her manage a plentiful cast of characters. Walker also noted that what she loves most in literary fiction are, "the characters, beautiful sentences, and the language," which comprises the structural focus of her novel.

Additionally, Walker claims that the premise for The Dreamers grew out of her debut novel, The Age of Miracles. Her first novel explores the various ways humans would suffer from the sudden halt of Earth during orbit. Out of this idea came the question of how an individual's sleeping schedule might radically change.

== Plot ==
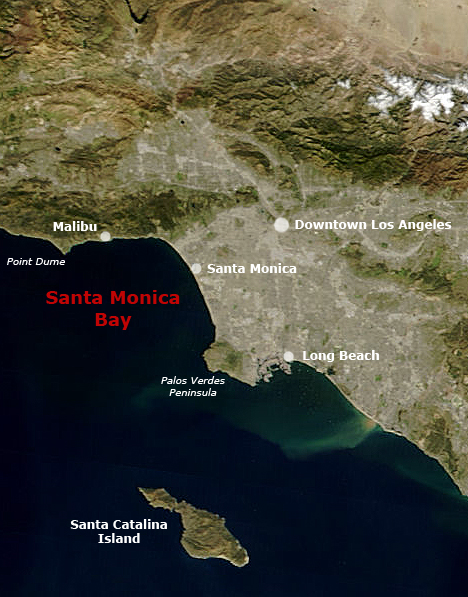
Map of Southern California, the general region where Karen Thompson Walker sets her novel.

The story begins with a college student, Kara Sanders, who after a night out, returns to her college dorm room with symptoms of drowsiness. The following morning, her roommate, Mei, a first year college student, dismisses her sleeping figure for tiredness. However, when Mei returns to the dorm room in the afternoon, she finds Kara in the same position she was in when she left. Mei calls the paramedics, who rush Kara to hospital, where her heart rate slows down to a complete stop and she is declared dead. Soon after, Rebecca, another girl from the same dorm floor, falls victim to the sleeping virus. Rebecca's heart rapidly slows and she is deemed unconscious; however, her pulse remains completely stable; her only symptom is deep sleep. Unknowingly, at the time of her comatose state, Rebecca is also a few days pregnant.

A janitor from the college, Thomas Peterson, who worked on the same dorm floor as the sleeping virus victims, returns home to his two daughters, Sara and Libby. He proceeds to prepare his daughters for isolation from the virus. Meanwhile, panic ensues on the dorm floor when it is believed that the sleeping virus could be highly contagious. As a result, the dorm floor is quarantined. It is announced that a third girl from the same dorm floor has lost consciousness. With each of the cases, it is confirmed through the mapping of brain activity that the sleepers are dreaming. It is also concluded that there is more brain activity in these sleepers than there ever has been in any human brain.

On the fourteenth day of the outbreak of the sleeping virus, a researcher concludes that the virus is airborne, traveling in a similar manner to the measles and the flu. The patients, nurses, and visitors from Santa Lora Hospital at the time of the announcement are all quarantined and their ventilation is cut off.

During a wildfire that breaks out in Southern California, Thomas becomes a victim of the sleeping virus and will not wake up, leaving his two daughters, Sara and Libby, alone in their house. During the fire, the college kids escape quarantine. Mei decides to take cover with Matthew in a vacant house.

Nathaniel, a biology professor at Santa Lora college, goes to visit Henry, his lover, at a nursing home. The doctors say that Henry has a counterintuitive symptom related to the sleeping virus that is not present in the other victims, as he suddenly starts talking, after being comatose for years. He is one of the only victims of the sleeping virus where the sickness works in the opposite way; it enhances life and consciousness rather than diminishing it.

In the meantime, the victim count in Santa Lora rises to five hundred. As a result, the town undergoes a cordon sanitaire to prevent the illness from spreading to other towns in California, or to the wider continental United States. On the morning of this large-scale quarantine, Ben, a college professor, finds his wife Annie sprawled on the kitchen floor with her eyes fluttering rapidly, a victim of the sleeping virus. Soon after, Ben begins having vivid dreams. He knows something absurd is happening to his memory, as he believes that he is dreaming of events to come. Ben's baby eventually gets the virus too, followed soon after by Ben. The next morning, Sara finds Libby asleep on the floor, mumbling with her eyes wide open. Mei also catches the virus, undergoing a form of sleep paralysis, characterized by the feeling of pressure on her chest and her inability to scream out for help. Although Libby's eyes are closed and she is in a far-off state, she is still conscious and aware of the world around her.

Seven weeks into the outbreak, Thomas is the second sleeping virus victim to wake up. He decides to leave the hospital and return home, where Sara is living by herself. Thomas appears distant, seeming intensely preoccupied with writing in his journal, and shouts about a fire. Sara tells Thomas that Libby has the sleeping virus, however, he claims that they have already discussed it, when they had not. Thomas is adamant that there was a fire in the college library that cured all of the sick, a belief that comes from a dream he had whilst asleep. Thomas experiments with fire and discovers that he can see the flame before he has lit the match, which leads him to the conclusion that he has, in fact, seen the future in his dreams. A day later, a fire starts in the college library. The fire miraculously awakens fourteen sleepers, including Ben, Annie, and Libby. Nine sleepers do not survive, including Mei. The cause of the fire is believed to be arson.

Libby discloses that she felt like she had only taken a nap, when she had, in fact, been asleep for three weeks. She states that she dreamt of her sister, Sara, and their mother, who died when they were young. Their father, Thomas, reveals that he dreamt that the oceans moved a hundred miles inland and completely covered Los Angeles underwater. Shortly after, the news announces that the largest ice shelf in Antarctica is expected to break off. As a result, Thomas realizes that all of the events in his dreams will become real life events. In the same week, Nathaniel wakes up after three weeks in a deep slumber. It is soon revealed, after Nathaniel finds Henry unmoving and unable to talk, that Henry never woke up; Nathaniel dreamt his medical breakthrough. The professor researches what his dream could mean and discovers a theory that claims the possibility that everything he dreamt has actually happened, but in a parallel universe.

Thirteen weeks after the outbreak of the sleeping virus, Rebecca's baby steadily grows inside her womb, while Rebecca remains in a deep sleep. The other girls from her college dorm floor, the first few to catch the virus, begin to wake up. In this same week, it is announced that there have been no new cases of the sleeping virus for seven days. Ben and Annie find that their baby has woken up. Ben tells Annie the dreams that he had about the future, but Annie tells him that he merely dreamt about events that they have already lived through. With no new cases of the virus in four weeks, it is announced that the sleeping contagion has officially ended. The cordon sanitaire is lifted and the town comes out of quarantine. However, eighty-five sleepers are still affected, including Rebecca. Rebecca sleeps through her contractions and her cesarean section, and eventually gives birth entirely asleep. Soon after this ordeal, when Rebecca wakes up, she discloses that she dreamt up another life, one with a son. She dreamt of raising him as a baby, watching him go to college, and then witnessing him have a child of his own. When the nurse reminds Rebecca that she had a baby girl, Rebecca remains adamant that she had a son, as she is unable to discern dream from reality.

It is revealed that all of the sleepers in Santa Lora dreamed of the lives they never lived, as well as the past, present, and future.

=== Main characters ===
Walker uses third-person narration in order to manage a large cast of characters, including a number of college students, couples, and families. The benefit of working with a multitude of characters is Walker's ability to "telescope in and out among these characters' experiences and the college town, animating both intimate and panoramic moments of the plague."

- Kara Sanders – A student from Santa Lora College, and the first victim of the sleeping illness.
- Rebecca – The second victim of the virus from the same college dorm floor. During her dream-like state, she is pregnant with a baby girl. She is one of the final victims to wake up. She was asleep for “almost a year.”
- Mei – The character at the "heart" of the novel. Kara's roommate. She hides out with a boy from the college dorm floor, Matthew, in a vacant house during the quarantine of the town.
- Matthew – Another student from Santa Lora College. He joins forces with Mei during the quarantine. They work together to help the victims of the virus.
- Catherine – A neuropsychiatrist working at Santa Lora hospital.
- Sara – A twelve-year-old girl who lives with her little sister, Libby, and their father, Thomas. Her mother died when she was young.
- Nathaniel – A senior professor of biology at Santa Lora College. He is in a relationship with Henry, another senior professor. For the duration of the novel, Henry is in a nursing home in a comatose state.
- Ben and Annie – The married couple who live next door to Sara, Libby, and Thomas. Ben is a professor of literature, and Annie is a professor of science. They have a newborn child.

== Adaptation ==
In September 2020, it was reported that ABC was developing a television series adaptation of novel. The series will be produced by Touchstone Television with Marta Kauffman, Hannah Canter, and Warren Littlefield as writer and executive producer.

== Reception ==
Hannah Beckerman of The Guardian claims that “not all of Walker’s characters are quite so well-rounded," as she states that Catherine's separation from her daughter, whilst quarantined in Santa Lora Hospital, “lacks the urgency and angst that one might expect to accompany an enforced separation." Beckermann continues, declaring that the story does not have enough “dramatic tension," as it is obvious to the reader that many of the characters in the extensive cast will fall victim to the sleeping virus, however, through lack of characterization, the reader does not “care enough about which of them will survive.” Despite these criticisms, Beckermann states that there is a “hypnotic quality to Walker’s writing," through her lyrical prose. Writing for The New York Times, Dwight Garner claims that none of Walker's characters “says or does an interesting thing.” He expresses the blandness of the characters’ internal monologue and dialogue. However, Garner also praises Walker for the sentimentality in her writing. He mentions how Walker weaves the fear of the climate crisis into her novel, particularly through the Santa Lora drought and Thomas’ dream about the collapse of one of Antarctica's largest ice caps, leaving Los Angeles underwater. Writing for The Washington Post, Sheila McClear, describes Walker's writing as “evocative” and calls the plot “bewitching.” David Canfield, writing for Entertainment Weekly, states that Walker's novel is an “exquisite work of intimacy” due to the author's avoidance of “typical disaster plotting.” He claims that Walker imbues “dazzling, aching humanity” in her exploration of the major themes in her novel, including the “conscious experience of loss, fear, and heartbreak.” Furthermore, writing for Readings, Amanda Rayner praises Walker's “choice of virus” for the “great dramatic implications” that it brings. She also commends the novel for its “compelling” capabilities as a “disaster novel” and as a “deeper meditation on dreams, consciousness and time.” While Kirkus Reviews describes The Dreamers as a "provocative, hypnotic tale" that asks compelling questions about the "nature of consciousness" and "loyalty and love that binds people together".
