= Téa Obreht =

American writer (born 1985)

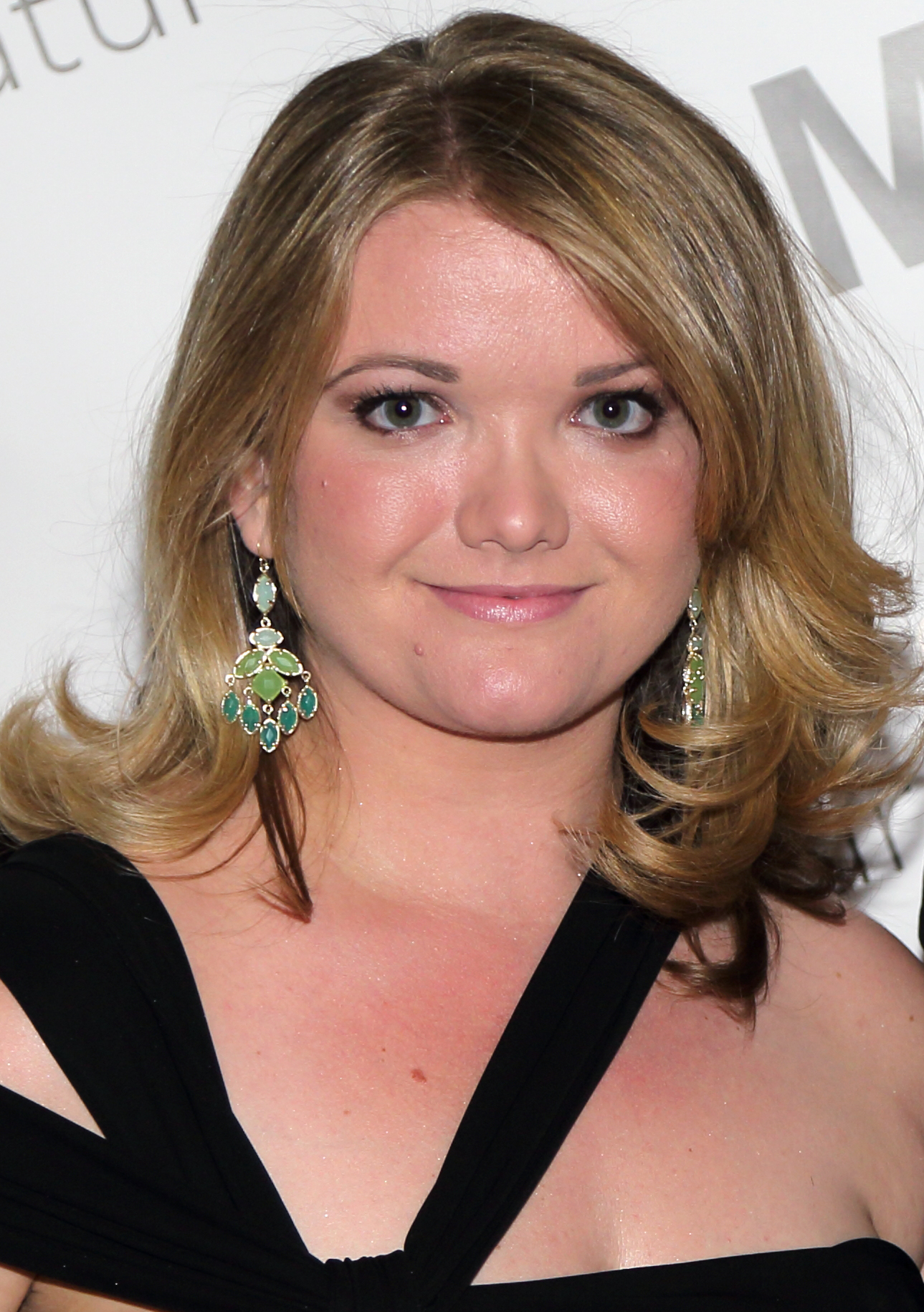
- Obreht at Pen America/Free Expression Literature, May 2014.
- Born: Tea Bajraktarević; 30 September 1985 (age 40); Belgrade, SR Serbia, SFR Yugoslavia
- Education: University of Southern California; Cornell University (MFA)
- Occupation: Fiction writer
- Writing career
- Genres: Novels, short stories
- Notable work: The Tiger's Wife
- Notable awards: Orange Prize (2011)
- Website: teaobreht.com

Téa Obreht (born Tea Bajraktarević; 30 September 1985) is an American novelist. She won the Orange Prize for Fiction in 2011 for The Tiger's Wife, her debut novel.

== Biography ==
Téa Obreht was born as Tea Bajraktarević in the autumn of 1985, in Belgrade, SR Serbia, SFR Yugoslavia as the only child of a single mother, Maja, while her father, a Bosniak, was "never part of the picture." Because of her lack of a father figure, she was close to her maternal grandparents, especially to her grandfather Štefan, a Slovene of German origin, and to her grandmother, Zahida, a Bosniak.

After graduating from the University of Southern California, Obreht received a MFA in fiction from the creative writing program at Cornell University in 2009.

Obreht's work has appeared in The New Yorker, Zoetrope: All-Story, Harper's, The New York Times and The Guardian, and in story anthologies.

Among many influences, Obreht has mentioned in press interviews the Colombian novelist Gabriel García Márquez, the Yugoslav Nobel Prize winner Ivo Andrić, Raymond Chandler, Ernest Hemingway, Isak Dinesen, Russian writer Mikhail Bulgakov, and the children's writer Roald Dahl.

Obreht is married to the Irish writer Dan Sheehan.

== The Tiger's Wife ==
The Tiger's Wife was published by Weidenfeld & Nicolson in 2010. It is a novel set in an unnamed Balkan country, in the present and half a century ago, and features a young doctor's relationship with her grandfather and the stories he tells her. These concern a "deathless man" who meets him several times in different places and never grows old, and a deaf-mute girl from his childhood village who befriends a tiger that escaped from a zoo. It was largely written while she was at Cornell, and excerpted in The New Yorker in June 2009. Asked to summarize it by a university journalist, Obreht replied, "It's a family saga that takes place in a fictionalized province of the Balkans. It's about a female narrator and her relationship to her grandfather, who's a doctor. It's a saga about doctors and their relationships to death throughout all these wars in the Balkans."

The Tiger's Wife won the British Orange Prize for Fiction in 2011 (for 2010 publications). Obreht was the youngest winner of the annual prize (established 1996), which recognizes "excellence, originality and accessibility in women's writing from throughout the world". Late in 2011 she was a finalist for that year's U.S. National Book Award for Fiction.

== Inland ==
Inland was published by Penguin Random House in 2019. It is set in the American West in the late 19th century.

== The Morningside ==
Obreht's third novel The Morningside was published in 2024.

== Sunrise ==
Sunrise, Obreht's fourth novel, was published August 11, 2026 by Penguin Random House.

== Awards ==
Year	Title	Award	Category	Result	Ref.
2011	The Tiger's Wife	Dylan Thomas Prize	—	Shortlisted	
2011	The Tiger's Wife	Galaxy National Book Awards	International Author	Shortlisted	
2011	The Tiger's Wife	National Book Award	Fiction	Finalist	
2011	The Tiger's Wife	Orange Prize	—	Won	
2011	The Tiger's Wife	Waterstones 11	—	Selection	
2012	The Tiger's Wife	Andrew Carnegie Medals for Excellence	Fiction	Longlisted	
2012	The Tiger's Wife	CBC Bookie Awards	International Fiction	Nominated	
2012	The Tiger's Wife	Crawford Award	—	Finalist	
2012	The Tiger's Wife	Indies Choice Book Awards	Adult Debut	Won	
2020	Inland	Andrew Carnegie Medals for Excellence	Fiction	Longlisted	
2020	Inland	Dylan Thomas Prize	—	Shortlisted	
2021	Inland	International Dublin Literary Award	—	Longlisted	
2021	Inland	Joyce Carol Oates Literary Prize	—	Longlisted	
2024	The Morningside	Joyce Carol Oates Literary Prize	—	Longlisted	
2025	The Morningside	Climate Fiction Prize	—	Pending	

== Bibliography ==
=== Novels ===
- —— (2011). The Tiger's Wife (hardcover 1st ed.). London: Weidenfeld & Nicolson. ISBN 9780297859017.
- —— (2019). Inland (hardcover 1st ed.). New York: Random House. ISBN 9780812992861.
- —— (2024). The Morningside (hardcover 1st ed.). New York: Random House. ISBN 9781984855503.
- —— (2026). Sunrise (hardcover 1st ed.). New York: Penguin Random House. ISBN 9781984855534.

=== Short stories ===
- —— (Aug 2009). "The Laugh". The Atlantic (Fiction Issue).
- —— (Summer 2010). "The Sentry". The Guardian (Summer Short Story Special).

=== Essays and reporting ===
- —— (Nov 2010). "Twilight of the Vampires: Hunting the Real-Life Undead". Harper's Magazine.
- —— (December 19–26, 2016). "David Attenborough's Exploration of Nature's Marvels and Brutality". Visionaries. The New Yorker. Vol. 92, no. 42. p. 104.
