= Sam Byers =

British novelist

- Born: 1979 (age 46–47)
- Education: University of East Anglia
- Occupation: Novelist
- Writing career
- Language: English
- Notable awards: Betty Trask Award (2014)
- Website: www.sambyers.co.uk

Sam Byers (born 1979) is a British novelist. He was born in Bury St Edmunds and now lives in Norwich, where he studied at the University of East Anglia (MA Creative Writing, 2004; PhD, 2014).

Byers' debut novel Idiopathy, a satire based on the spread of a BSE-like disease, received a Betty Trask Award and the Waterstones 11 prize. Idiopathy was also shortlisted for the 2013 Costa Book Awards First Novel award, and longlisted for the 2014 Desmond Elliott Prize.

In 2018 Byers published his second novel, Perfidious Albion, "a new media satire that switches into a hi-tech dystopia centred on class politics."

In 2021 he published his third novel, Come Join Our Disease.

== Awards ==
- 2014 Betty Trask Award, Idiopathy
- 2013 Waterstones 11, Idiopathy

== Bibliography ==
- Idiopathy (2013)
- Perfidious Albion (2018)
- Come Join Our Disease (2021)
