= Kevin Maher (writer) =

Irish writer and film critic (born 1972)

- Born: 1972 (age 53–54); Dublin, Ireland
- Education: University College Dublin
- Occupations: Writer; film critic
- Years active: 1994–present
- Employer: The Times
- Children: 3
- Website: thetimes.co.uk/profile/kevin-maher

Kevin Maher (born 1972) is an Irish writer. He is currently employed as a film critic at The Times. His work has appeared in The Guardian, The Independent, and The Observer. His debut novel, The Fields, was published by Reagan Arthur Books in 2013. It was listed in the 2013 Waterstones 11, a literary book prize aimed at promoting debut authors.

== Early life ==
Maher was born in Dublin, Ireland, in 1972. His parents were lower middle class Catholics. His grandfather was a fighter in the Irish War of Independence in Tipperary. He graduated from University College Dublin in 1994, with an MA degree in film. During his graduation, he wrote for university magazines.

== Career ==
After graduating, Maher moved to London, England, in 1994, to focus on journalism. Before starting his career as a film critic, he worked as a waiter for several years. He wrote for The Face and Time Out before joining The Times. He took a year off in 2001 after having his first child and in 2002, he first approached The Times to write for it. He joined the newspaper in 2004. Since then, he has been writing reviews and weekly columns for it. He has interviewed directors including Spike Lee, Martin Scorsese, and Dennis Hopper.

Maher worked as a researcher on the Channel 4 show Film Night. He also conducted an online course in film criticism for The Times.

== Writing style ==
Maher believes that being true to oneself is an important trait for all young writers. In interviews, he has stated that he avoids writing reviews based on discussions with his peer critics, believing they should be written exclusively from one's own perspective. His reviews are often contrary to critical consensus, with an analysis of all his film reviews from 2020 to 2025 as collated by Rotten Tomatoes showing the average score of films given 0/5 by Maher being 83%. His other star ratings did however track with the consensus, with one-star films scoring 51%, two-stars 66%, three stars 79%, four stars 84%, and five stars 89%.

== Personal life ==
Maher lives in Hertfordshire, England, along with his three children and wife.

== Bibliography ==
- The Fields (2013)
- Last Night on Earth (2015)
