= Bibhuti Bhushan Nayak =

Indian journalist (born 1965)

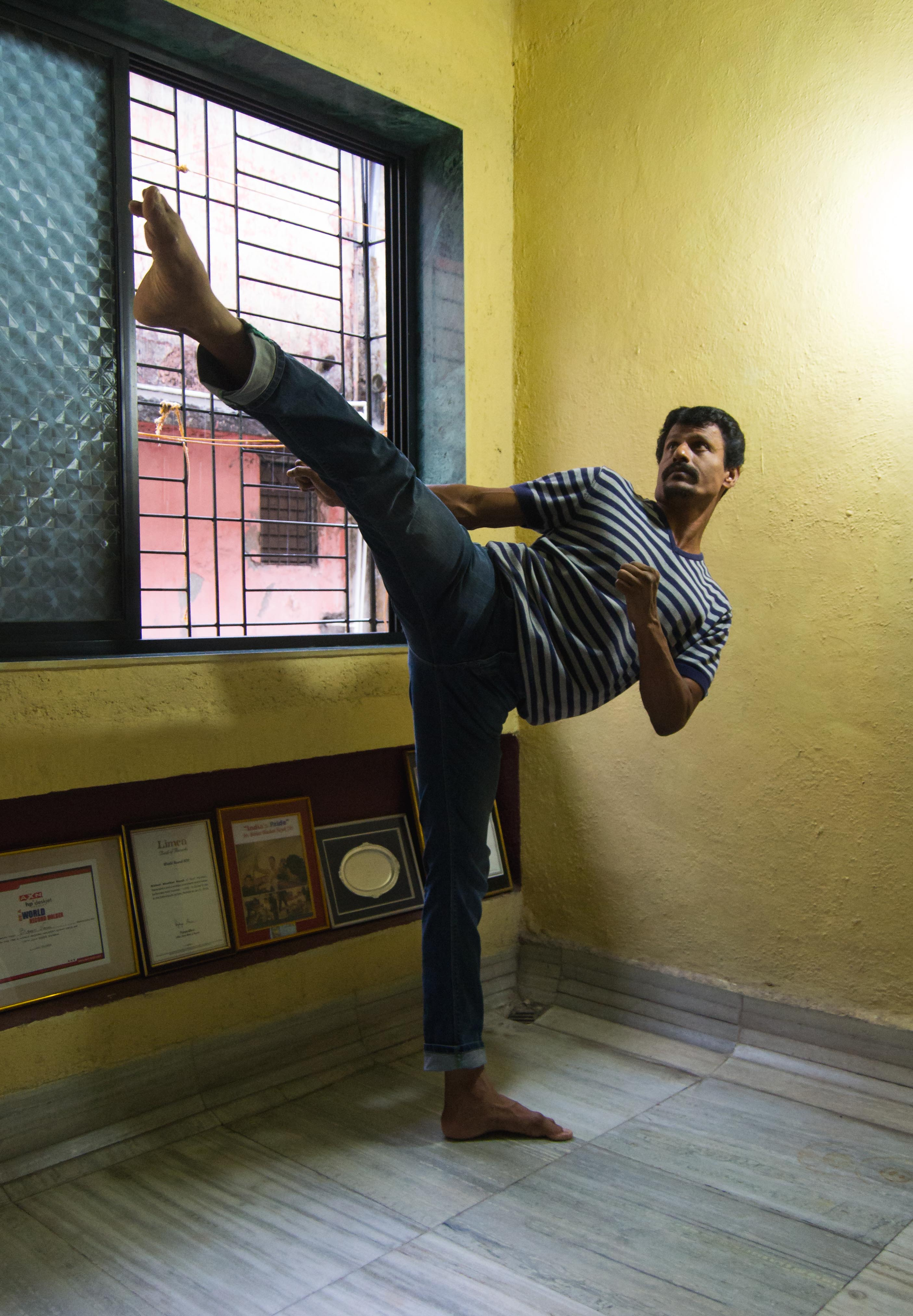
- Born: 1965 (age 60–61); Orissa, India
- Other name: BB Nayak
- Occupations: Journalist, martial artist
- Known for: Guinness World Records and Limca Book of Records for physical strengths
- Spouse: Smruti Nayak
- Children: Shubham Nayak

Bibhuti Bhushan Nayak (born 1965) is an Indian journalist, who holds seven Guinness World Records and 12 Limca Book Records in physical strength to his name. He aims to have 72 records to his name. He currently manages his ancestral business, works as a journalist at The Times of India and teaches underprivileged children martial arts to continue the training of breaking world records. Bibhuti sustains himself on a completely vegetarian diet consisting only of pulses and sprouts. Nayak graduated as a management student from Osmania University. In recognition of his physical strength feats, he was given an honorary title of Singh and a pagri (turban) by the Gurudwara where he attempted the record. In addition to that, he is popularly known as the Bruce Lee of Navi Mumbai, for his martial arts and record breaking accolades.

== Students ==
Three of his students hold records in the Limca Book of Records. One of his students Indresh Naithani, cartwheeled 5 kilometres in a record time of 64 minutes 37 seconds.

== Records ==
He holds the world record for most concrete slabs broken over the groin with a sledgehammer (three); highest number of one-handed cartwheels in one minute (34); and highest number of sit-ups in one hour (1,448).

Bibhuti holds the following records to his name:

Year	Date	Record Level	Record	Repetitions/Count	Past Count
2001		Guinness and Limca	Most Number of Backhand push-ups in one hour	819	
1998		Guinness and Limca	Most number of times being kicked in the groin	43	
1999		Guinness and Limca	Most number of stomach sit-ups in one hours	1448	
2002		Guinness and Limca	Most number of palm push-ups in one minute	133	116
2002		Guinness and Limca	Most number of 41lbs cement blocks broken on groin	3	1
2004		Limca	27 one hand chin-ups in 42 seconds	27	
2005		Limca	Most number of fingertip Push-ups	114	
2008		Guinness and Limca	Most one fisted Cartwheels in one minute	34	
2009		Limca	Most number of knuckle push-ups in one minute	111	
2010		Limca	Fastest 1000 crunches	16.52 minutes	
2009		Limca	Most number of knuckle push-ups involving clap in one minute	35	
2015	24 June	Guinness	Most number of double alternate squat thrusts in one minute	71	
2015	24 June	Guinness	Most number of one-legged martial arts kicks in one minute	250	
2015	24 June	Guinness	Most number of Squats in one minute	75	
2015		Guinness	Most number of Baseball bats broken on the shin bone	To be attempted	

=== Medical consequences ===
In the course of setting the record for the most number of sit ups in one hour, Bibhuti suffered a brain hemorrhage and spent three days in a coma due to the lack of any padding underneath his head and in the process hit the back of his head against the concrete floor 1,448 times.

== Biographical book ==
His fictional biography has been written by Stephen Kelman, Nominee of the 2011 Booker award for his novel, Pigeon English which was released by Bloomsbury Publishing House on 13 August 2015 in 28 countries. The book is titled Man on Fire.

Bibhuti has a unique perspective on life and he is an inspirational force in the lives around him, and this is what I hoped to capture in Man on Fire.

— Stephen Kelman, Mid-Day newspaper interview, Nov 2014
