= Marjorie Celona =

American-Canadian writer

- Born: January 7, 1981 (age 45); Victoria, British Columbia, Canada
- Occupations: Novelist, short story writer
- Writing career
- Period: 2000s–present
- Notable works: Y (2012); How a Woman Becomes a Lake (2020)

Marjorie Celona (born January 7, 1981) is an American-Canadian writer. Their debut novel, Y, published in 2012, won the Waterstones 11 literary prize and was a shortlisted nominee for the Center for Fiction's Flaherty-Dunnan First Novel Prize, the Amazon.ca First Novel Award and a longlisted nominee for the Scotiabank Giller Prize.

== Life and career ==
Born and raised in Victoria, British Columbia, Celona studied creative writing at the University of Victoria before attending the Iowa Writers' Workshop. Celona has published stories, book reviews, and essays in The O. Henry Prize Stories, The Best American Nonrequired Reading, The Southern Review, Harvard Review, and elsewhere.

Celona was the winner of the Bronwen Wallace Award in 2008 for their short story "Othello". Celona's short story "Counterblast" won a 2018 O. Henry Award, and was selected as a juror favorite by author Ottessa Moshfegh.

Celona's most recent novel, How a Woman Becomes a Lake, was published in March 2020.

Celona currently teaches in the MFA program at the University of Oregon.

== Bibliography ==
=== Novels ===
- Y (2012)
- How a Woman Becomes a Lake (2020)
