= Amanda Hodgkinson =

British novelist (born 1965)

- Born: 25 October 1965 (age 60); Somerset, England
- Education: University of East Anglia
- Occupation: Novelist
- Writing career
- Period: 2011–present
- Genre: Fiction
- Website: amandahodgkinson.com

Amanda Hodgkinson (born 25 October 1965, Somerset, England) is a British novelist.

Hodgkinson's debut novel 22 Britannia Road was a bestseller in the United States and the Netherlands, and won multiple awards including the Waterstones 11 award in 2011 for best debut novels, The Silver Feather and The Italian Cariparma Award 2012.

== Biography ==
Hodgkinson was born in Somerset but grew up in a village on the estuary of the River Blackwater in Essex. She associates her memories of childhood with "shingle beaches and mudflats, grey-green heather, salt marshes, messing about in boats, gangs of rowdy kids playing all day along the sea-walls, and the ever-present cries of seagulls".

Later, Hodgkinson moved to Suffolk, where she took an MA degree in creative writing at the University of East Anglia. After the MA, Hodgkinson and her family decided to move to South West France. It took them a few years to settle down, to learn the language and to get used to living in another country far from relatives and friends.

Hodgkinson currently lives in Ipswich and is working at Ipswich university. She is married and has two children.

== Works and critical reception ==
22 Britannia Road (2011) was Hodgkinson's debut novel. Her second book Spilt Milk was released in February 2014. and her novella Tin Town ("Grand Central: Original Stories of Postwar Love and Reunion", Penguin US) was published in July 2014.

=== 22 Britannia Road ===
22 Britannia Road was published in 2011, and it became a New York Times bestseller in the United States and a bestseller in the Netherlands. In the same year the novel was nominated as one of the laureates in "The East Anglian Book Awards". It also won the Wаterstones 11 prize for best debut novels in 2011, The Italian Cаripаrma Award 2012, The Silver Feather and The Prix Agоra de St Fоy 2013 in France. Kate Saunders' review in The Times described it as "an affecting story, extremely well told". The novel has been translated into 15 languages and sold worldwide.

The novel is about a Polish family, whose members try to get back to the previous life during the aftermath of WWII. Young parents, Janusz and Silvana have been married for less than a year when the war breaks out and Janusz has to join the army. Silvana and her newborn son, Aurek stay behind in the occupied Poland. Trying to hide from German soldiers, the young woman disappears into the wild forests of Poland where for the next five years, she lives, feeding the baby and herself with berries and tree bark. In the forests Silvana meets other people who try to find a quiet place during the wartime. The boy grows up with the thought that the trees are his best friends and all the people except his mother are enemies.

Meanwhile Janusz, the only survivor of his destroyed military unit, goes to France where he meets the beautiful Hélène and falls in love with her. However, Janusz looks forward to the end of the war in order to find his wife and son.

Five years later, Janusz, having settled in Ipswich, receives a letter saying that Silvаna and Aurеk are found in a camp for refugees. He decides to retrieve his family and brings them back to England. Silvаna and Aurek move to Ipswich, where together with Janusz they attempt to forget about the past and start a new life.

Aurek goes to school, Silvana looks after the house and Janusz gets a promotion. It seems that everything is going as it should, but the dark secrets that they carry still remain and end up pulling the family apart. "22 Britannia Road" is a novel about the survival: a story of the ability of war ruin peace and family - the main values in life which are so difficult to get back.

The Washington Independent Review of Books compares Silvana's story with the suffering protagonist Sophie of William Styron’s novel Sophie's Choice. The author of the article wrote that "while no one with any humanity could fault Styrоn’s Sophie for taking her own life, Silvana’s perseverance in the face of sееmingly insurmountable odds is ennоbling".

=== Spilt Milk ===
In 2014, Penguin Books released Hodgkinson's second novel "Spilt Milk". In Rachel Hore's review of Spilt Milk in The Independent newspaper, she wrote "Amanda Hodgkinson is fast becoming a fine fictional chronicler of women’s lives in the mid-20 century".

The novel "traces the eventful lives of two sisters from before the first world war to the 1960s".

1913. Unmarried Nellie, Vivian and Rose Marsh live "on the edge of the world" in a small cottage on the banks of the Little River in Suffolk, miles from the village. The Marsh parents died when Nellie and Vivian were children and the elder, Rose, brought them up alone, away from society, in the safety of the spinster life. Their life-path is quiet and steady, until one day a flood on the Little River brings an unusual fish and a handsome traveller Joe Ferier comes and changes their lives forever.

1939. Nellie and Vivian are grown-up women and they are not as close as they used to be. The sisters live far from each other and Nellie has an 18-year-old daughter Birdie. When Nellie finds out that Birdie is expecting a baby, she turns to her sister and asks Vivian to help her niece with the child's adoption.

As the years pass Birdie tries to find her lost daughter and she discovers that the Marsh sisters’ dark past is following her.

=== Tin Town ===
In July 2014, the collection of short stories Grand Central: Original Stories of Postwar Love and Reunion was released, which included Hodgkinson's novella Tin Town.

Tin Town is a novella about the British women who emigrated to the US in the 1940s in the pursuit of love and happiness. These women had left their homes and families on the way to a new and better life.

In Tin Town the main character, a small girl Molly cannot understand why she has to move to America with her mother. Molly wants to be back home with her sister Susan, Susan's husband Clarkie and Grandmother, and she recalls the last years spent in the house on the farm in their small English village.
