= Grace McCleen =

British novelist

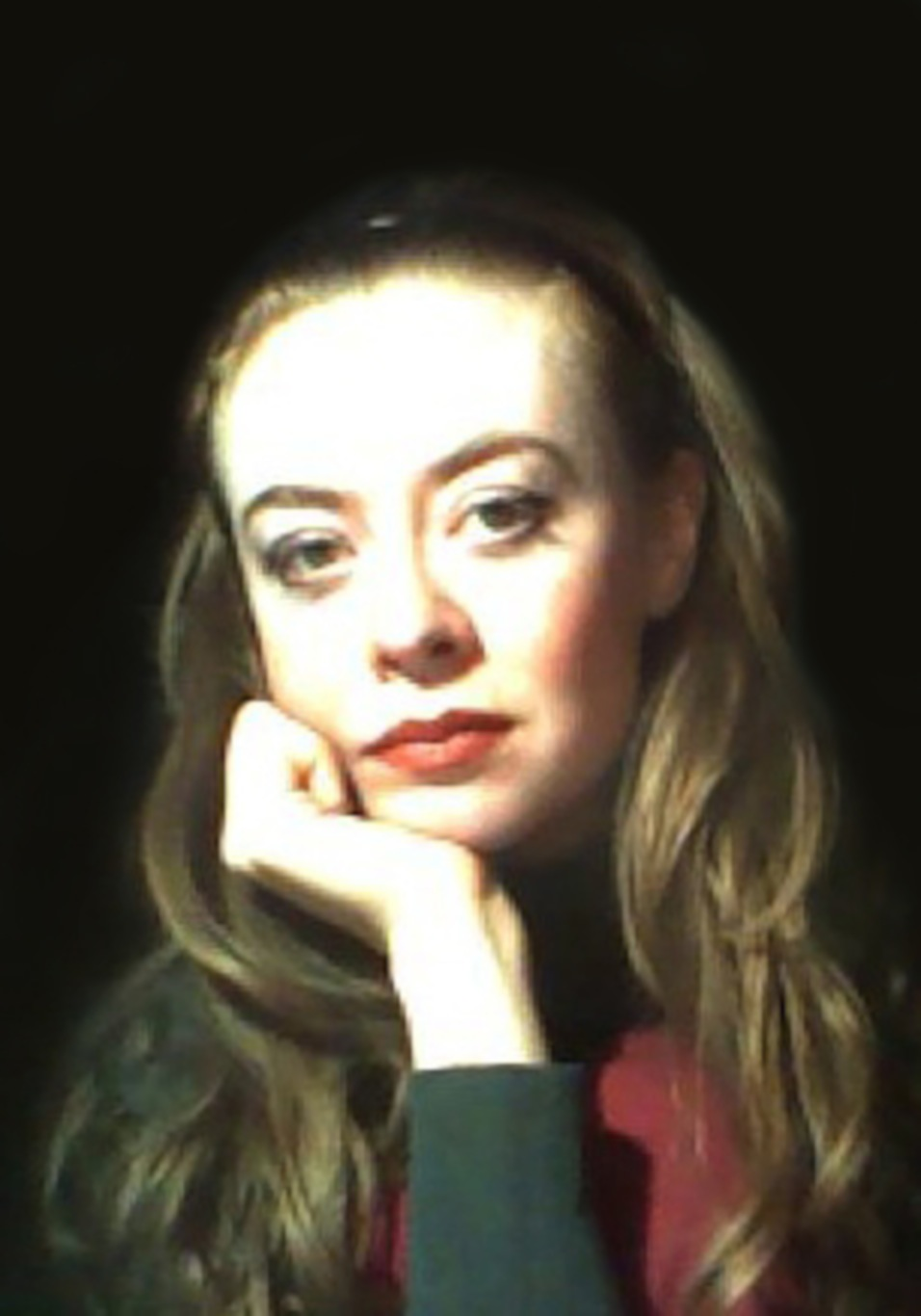
- McCleen in 2016
- Born: 1981 (age 44–45)
- Education: Brasenose College, Oxford; University of York
- Occupation: Author
- Writing career
- Notable works: The Land of Decoration (2012), The Professor of Poetry (2013)
- Notable awards: The Desmond Elliot Prize 2012, The Betty Trask Award 2013

Grace McCleen (born 1981) is a British novelist. She has won the Desmond Elliott Prize, Betty Trask Award and the Jerwood Fiction Uncovered Prize.

== Life ==
McCleen was brought up in a fundamentalist Christian sect in Wales and for most of her childhood did not have much contact with outsiders.

McCleen went to the University of Oxford to read English Literature aged 22. She later completed a MA, also in English Literature, at the University of York. She experienced opposition from her religious community to her decision to attend university. "It was an enormous step and one I almost didn't take, and one I felt bad about taking for many years afterwards, until I realised I hadn't done anything wrong."

After graduation she experienced a mental breakdown and suffered from tinnitus and Chronic fatigue syndrome. During her illness, she wrote "a long novel. It didn’t work and from that novel came three novels": The Land of Decoration (2012), The Professor of Poetry (2013), and The Offering (2015).

McCleen has said that she will not continue to write fiction. "Writing is really destructive to me." "I feel it's sort of like a knife in me". She may, however, continue to write poetry.

In 2016 McCleen was writer in residence at the Brontë Parsonage Museum; McCleen's time as writer in residence inspired Every Sounding Line, a collection of poetry influenced by the Brontë family. In 2017 she was writer in residence at the Manchester Centre for New Writing at the University of Manchester.

McCleen is also a musician, singer and songwriter. She writes occasionally for The Guardian.

== Critical reception ==
The Land of Decoration was described by Amity Gaige in The New York Times Book Review as "Gripping ... philosophically sophisticated ... The writing is born of a genuine inquiry into the nature of religious belief, especially as it relates to one’s psychological development". Chris Cleave in Financial Times called the book "loveable, unique and thrillingly uncategorisable ... an extraordinary and peculiarly haunting novel.’ Colin Greenland, however, in The Guardian, felt that "the world outside is ... contrived and confused ... [and that this] perilously weakens [McCleen's] argument"., and Ron Charles, in The Washington Post, felt "Much of the language here is too flat and pedestrian. Other passages soar into flights of preciousness".

The Professor of Poetry was described by Hilary Mantel as "an astonishing and luminous novel". Hepzibah Anderson in The Observer found "sentences here of such agile cleverness, charged with wit and beauty and enchantment." Kate Clanchy, also in The Observer, however, found it "conservative and anti-feminist".

Sam Kitchener in The Telegraph said of The Offering that "Huge questions, of faith, time, reality, individual responsibility and human sexuality are given pained and peculiar answers". Max Liu in The Independent wrote that "Some of the dense, descriptive passages are frustrating to read but difficulty is one of this novel’s enduring themes".

== Influences ==
McCleen has said that she is influenced by Marilynne Robinson, Cormac McCarthy, W. G. Sebald, Thomas Mann, Virginia Woolf, Emily Dickinson, T.S. Eliot, Walt Whitman, Gerard Manley Hopkins, Franz Kafka and the novel Moby-Dick by Herman Melville .

== Bibliography ==
=== Novels ===
- The Land of Decoration (2012)
- The Professor of Poetry (2013)
- The Offering (2015)

The Land of Decoration has been translated into 16 languages.

=== Other work ===
- Every Sounding Line (2016)
- "The Love Story", a short story in the collection How Much the Heart Can Hold: Seven Stories on Love (2016)

== Awards ==
- 2012 Desmond Elliott Prize – won for The Land of Decoration
- 2013 Betty Trask Award – won for The Land of Decoration
- 2015 Jerwood Fiction Uncovered Prize – one of eight winners for The Offering
