= Chanelle Benz =

American author and educator

- Education: Syracuse University
- Writing career
- Language: English
- Notable work: The Man Who Shot Out My Eye is Dead, The Gone Dead

Chanelle Benz is a British American author and associate professor of English at Syracuse University in Syracuse, New York. She is known for her short story collection The Man Who Shot Out My Eye is Dead (2017) and her novel The Gone Dead (2019).

== Early life and education ==
Benz was born in London to English and Antiguan parents. Benz lived in London until the age of 7, when her family moved to New Jersey, then Sunset, Utah, and lastly, Centreville, Virginia.

Benz earned a bachelor's degree in acting from Boston University before earning an MFA in creative writing from Syracuse University in 2012. At Syracuse University, she studied under the writer George Saunders.

== Career ==
Benz published her first book, a short story collection titled The Man Who Shot Out My Eye Is Dead in 2017. In 2019, Benz published her first novel, The Gone Dead, about a woman who returns to her childhood home in the Mississippi Delta and uncovers information regarding the death of her father. The novel was reviewed positively in The New York Times and The Washington Post.

Both books were published by Ecco Press, an imprint of HarperCollins.

Benz has also published works in Granta, The New York Times, Guernica, Fence, and The American Reader, among other publications.
