= Pigeon English =

Book by Stephen Kelman

- Author: Stephen Kelman
- Language: English
- Published: 2011 (Bloomsbury Publishing)
- Publication place: United Kingdom
- Media type: Print (hardback)
- Pages: 288
- ISBN: 978-1408815687

Pigeon English is the debut novel by English author Stephen Kelman. It is told from the point of view of Harrison Opoku, an eleven-year-old Ghanaian immigrant living on a tough London estate. It was shortlisted for the Man Booker Prize in 2011.

== Plot ==
The novel begins with the death of a young boy on the fictional Dell Farm estate in an unspecified area of London. Harrison Opoku or 'Harri', is a recent Ghanaian immigrant living with his mother and older sister, Lydia. His father, younger sister and grandparents still live in Ghana, though they hope to move in the future. He becomes an amateur detective and tries to solve the murder of a boy who was murdered outside a fast food restaurant. He experiences an extreme amount of gang warfare and poverty. As well as investigating the murder with his best friend Dean, Harrison shares with the reader his thoughts, impressions and experiences of growing up in an environment beset with pressures and threats. The novel explores his attempts to remain good despite the corrupting forces around him. Harrison then befriends a pigeon, which narrates part of the book.

Eventually, he traces the murderers as a gang of teenagers, only to be murdered at the end.

== Publication ==
It was first published in March 2011 by Bloomsbury in the United Kingdom.

== Reception ==
The novel was critically acclaimed on publication and was shortlisted for the 2011 Man Booker Prize. It went on to be shortlisted for ten awards, including the Guardian First Book Award, Desmond Elliott Prize, and Galaxy National Book Award. The book became a bestseller, and has featured in a national campaign launched by the National Literacy Trust and the Booker Prize Foundation to encourage prisoners to read. It is also widely studied in schools and universities.

== Stage adaptation ==
The novel was adapted into a play by Fringe First winner Gbolahan Obisesan. The play was a co-commission between Bristol Old Vic Young Company and National Youth Theatre, directed by Miranda Cromwell. The play performed at the Bristol Old Vic and 2013 Edinburgh Festival.
