= Stephen Kelman =

English novelist, born 1970

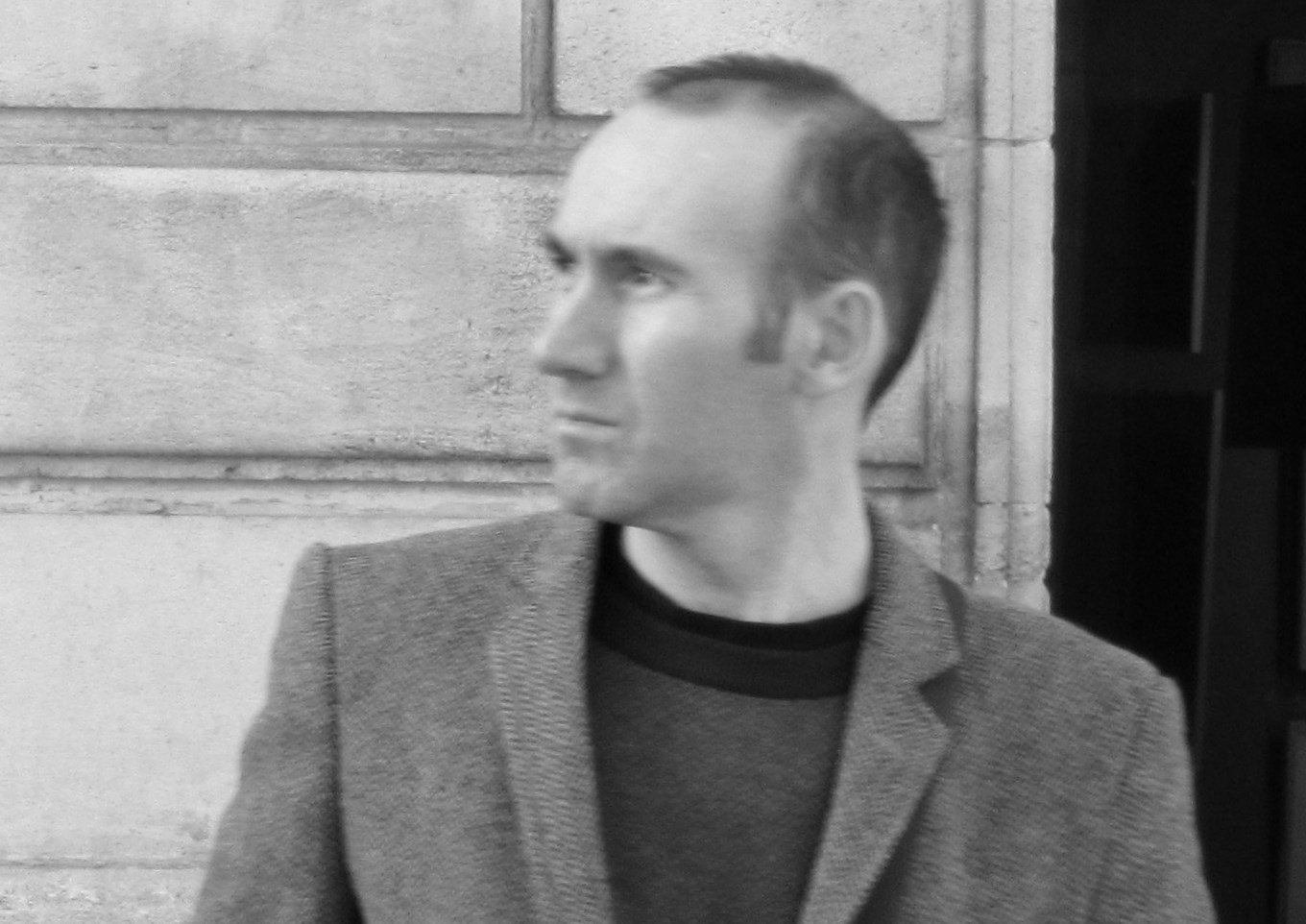
- Born: 1976 (age 49–50); Luton, Bedfordshire, UK
- Education: University of Luton
- Occupation: Author
- Known for: Pigeon English

Stephen Kelman (born 1976) is an English novelist. His debut novel, Pigeon English, was shortlisted for the 2011 Man Booker Prize.

== Early life and education ==
Born in 1976, Kelman grew up in Luton on the Marsh Farm council estate, and earned a degree in marketing at the University of Luton.

== Career ==
Kelman held a variety of jobs, in a warehouse, in marketing, in local government, and as a caseworker, before deciding in 2005 to focus on writing.

After writing several screenplays which were not picked up and a novel which he did not submit, Kelman completed the first draft of a second novel, Pigeon English, shortly before being made redundant from his local authority position. It was rescued from a literary agency's slush pile and published in 2011 after a bidding war between publishers. It was a commercial success and was shortlisted for the 2011 Man Booker Prize, the Desmond Elliott Prize, the Guardian First Book Award and the 2011 Galaxy National Book Awards New Writer of the Year Award, and was one of the Waterstones 11 in that award's first year. It is based on the killing of Damilola Taylor but its protagonist is an 11-year-old Ghanaian instead of a 10-year-old Nigerian.

In 2015 Kelman published a second novel, Man on Fire, based on the life of Bibhuti Bhushan Nayak, an Indian journalist and multiple record holder for feats of endurance and repeated exercises.

== Personal life ==
Kelman and his wife, Uzma, married in 2011. He has written about being abused by his father.
