= Gbolahan Obisesan =

British Nigerian writer and director

- Born: 1981 or 1982 (age 44–45); Nigeria
- Education: London Guildhall University
- Occupations: Director; Writer
- Notable work: Mad About the Boy

Gbolahan Obisesan is a British Nigerian writer and director. He was the Artistic Director and Joint CEO at Brixton House theatre. He has served as a Genesis Fellow and Associate Director at the Young Vic.

== Early life ==
Obisesan was born in Nigeria and moved to the UK when he was 9 years old. He grew up in Bermondsey and New Cross. He attended Southwark College, where he earned a Distinction in Communication & Visual Design in 2000. He later completed a Bachelor's degree in Communication and Visual Studies at London Guildhall University and was involved with the National Youth Theatre.

== Career ==
Obisesan has served as a writer, actor and director. He won the Jerwood Directors Award from the Young Vic for Sus in 2010. In 2011 Obisesan's play Mad About the Boy won the Fringe First for best play. It was published by Nick Hern Books. He directed four plays for epic 66 books at the Bush Theatre. It went on to tour the Unicorn Theatre, Royal Court Theatre and Bush Theatre. He was the only British writer for Rufus Norris's Feast at the Royal Court Theatre in 2013. Obisesan adapted Pigeon English by Stephen Kelman for the Bristol Old Vic in 2013. The production was taken to the Edinburgh Festival Fringe, where it was described as "theatre made by young people, about young people, for everybody". He wrote and directed How Nigeria Became: A Story, and A Spear That Didn't Work, which ran at the Unicorn Theatre in 2014. The play commemorated the centenary of Nigeria and was nominated for the 2014 Offie for Best Productions for Young People. He was made the Young Vic Genesis Fellow in 2015.

In 2016 Obisesan directed Charlene James's Cuttin'it, which premiered at the Young Vic before touring to Birmingham Repertory Theatre, Royal Court Theatre, Crucible Theatre and London's Yard Theatre In 2017 it was nominated for a Laurence Olivier Award for Outstanding Achievement in Affiliate Theatre. His latest production, The Fishermen is an adaption of the novel by Chigozie Obioma. It debuted at HOME theatre in Manchester, UK, in 2018.

Obisesan was made artistic director at the Brixton House (formerly Ovalhouse) theatre in January 2020 and left in January 2023. In the wake of the George Floyd murder and the associated protests, Obisesan called for British theatre to become more inclusive. At the time, less than 5% of London theatre employees were black and minority ethnic, whilst the population of London are 40%. In an interview with The Guardian, Obisesan said, “perpetuating whiteness across institutions and organisations can no longer be the norm,”.

=== Directing and writing ===
- 2011 Sus at the Young Vic
- 2011 Mad About the Boy for the Edinburgh Festival Fringe
- 2013 Feast at the Royal Court Theatre
- 2013 Pigeon English at the Bristol Old Vic
- 2014 We are Proud to Present at the Bush Theatre (directed)
- 2014 How Nigeria Became: A Story, and A Spear That Didn't Work at the Unicorn Theatre
- 2014 Off the Page at the Royal Court Theatre (directed)
- 2015 Re:Exhibit at the Bush Theatre
- 2016 Zaida and Aadam at the Bush Theatre
- 2016 Cuttin'it by Charlene James (directed)
- 2018 The Fishermen
- 2019 SS Mendi: Dancing the Death Drill (directed)
- 2019 Random (directed)
- 2019 Yvette (directed)
- 2019 The Last King of Scotland (directed)
- 2020 The Mountaintop
