= The Universe Versus Alex Woods =

2013 novel by Gavin Extence

- First edition (publ. Hodder & Stoughton)
- Author: Gavin Extence
- Language: English
- Publication date: 2013

The Universe Versus Alex Woods (2013) is the debut novel by Gavin Extence. The book was described by Emma John in The Guardian as being "the everyday tale of a teenage science nerd hit by a meteorite who strikes up a friendship with a pot-smoking Vietnam veteran. And may or may not be involved in his death." The book has been compared to The Curious Incident of the Dog in the Night-Time, as well as the writing of Kurt Vonnegut. The book won the Waterstones Eleven award, and was nominated for the National Book Awards.
