= Karen Thompson Walker =

American novelist

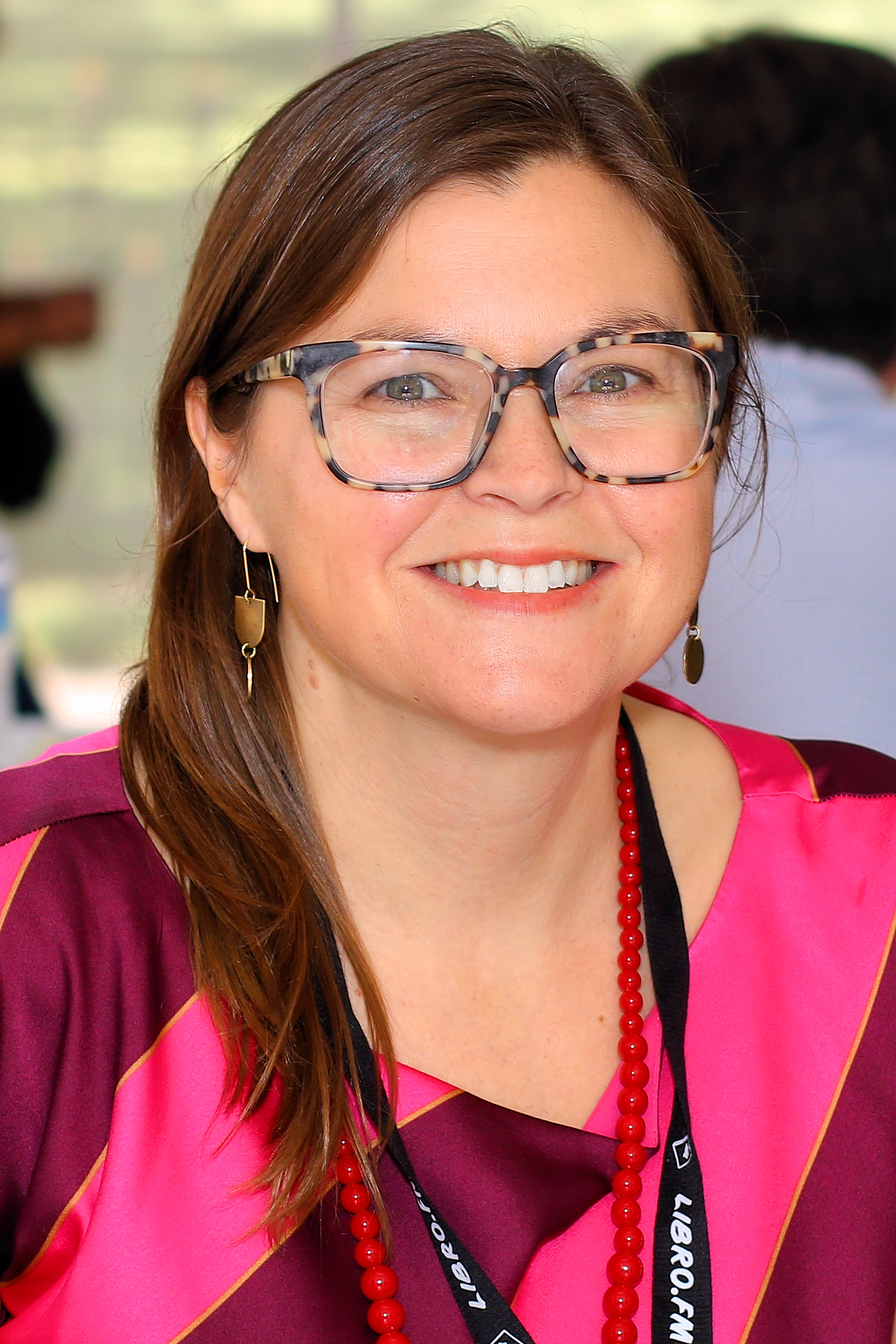
- Thompson Walker at the 2025 Texas Book Festival
- Born: San Diego, California, U.S.
- Education: University of California, Los Angeles; Columbia University
- Occupation: Novelist; Professor
- Writing career
- Language: English
- Notable work: The Age of Miracles (2012); The Dreamers (2019)
- Website: karenthompsonwalker.com

Karen Thompson Walker is an American novelist. Her first book, The Age of Miracles, was published in 2012. Walker's second novel, The Dreamers was published in 2019. Her most recent novel, The Strange Case of Jane O., was published in 2025. Walker has been featured in Jezebel, Electric Literature, Publishers Weekly, National Public Radio, The Washington Post, The Guardian, and more.

== Biography ==
Karen Thompson Walker was born in San Diego, California. She earned her degrees in English language and creative writing from the University of California, Los Angeles. While in college, Walker wrote for the Daily Bruin. After completing her undergraduate degree, Walker worked as a journalist for a newspaper in San Diego. She completed her master's degree at Columbia University.

After graduating from Columbia, Walker lived with her husband in Brooklyn, New York. She worked as an editor at Simon & Schuster. Today, she lives in Oregon and is an assistant professor at the University of Oregon in the Creative Writing Department.

== Awards and honors ==
Walker was awarded the Bomb "best fiction" prize. In 2011, she was awarded a Sirenland Fellowship.

== Works ==
- Walker, Karen Thompson (2012-06-21). The Age of Miracles. New York: Random House Trade Paperbacks. ISBN 978-0-8129-8294-7.
- Walker, Karen Thompson (2019-01-15). The Dreamers. Random House Trade Paperbacks. ISBN 978-0-8129-8466-8.
- Walker, Karen Thompson (2025-02-25). The Strange Case of Jane O. New York: Random House. ISBN 978-1-9848-5394-3.
