= The Panopticon (novel) =

2012 novel by Jenni Fagan

- First edition
- Author: Jenni Fagan
- Published: 3 May 2012
- Publisher: Heinemann
- Pages: 336
- ISBN: 9780434021772

The Panopticon is a novel published in 2012 by Jenni Fagan.

== Synopsis ==
The novel is about a 15-year-old girl called Anais who grows up in care and is trapped by the care and criminal justice systems in the UK. She is intelligent and imaginative, and creates a rich fantasy world, and dreams of possible other lives for herself. It has a surrealist element to the narrative.

The author says that the care system acts as a metaphor for the way people conform to structures imposed on them by society and various surveillance measures.

== Publication ==
The Panopticon was written by Jenni Fagan, who was herself brought up in care, when she was 34 years old, and published in 2012.

== Reception ==
It was well-reviewed in several major newspapers in the UK and US, shortlisted for several awards, and translated into at least eight languages by 2019.

== Adaptations ==
In October 2019, the National Theatre of Scotland staged an adaptation of the novel at the Platform in Glasgow and the Traverse Theatre in Edinburgh.

The Panopticon was optioned by Sixteen Films, Ken Loach's film production company. It was in production as of September 2019, with the script written by Fagan and Joe Frost directing, due to be released in 2020. However, as of February 2022 there is shown as "in development" on IMDb, with no further information.
