= The Tiger's Wife =

2011 novel by Téa Obreht

- Front cover of US edition
- Author: Téa Obreht
- Audio read by: Robin Sachs; Susan Duerden
- Language: English
- Publisher: Weidenfeld & Nicolson (UK); Random House (US)
- Publication date: 3 March 2011 (UK); 8 March 2011 (US)
- Publication place: United Kingdom; United States
- Media type: Print (hardcover), ebook, audiobook
- Pages: 337 pp (hardcover 1st ed.)
- ISBN: 9780297859017 (hardcover 1st ed.); 9780385343831 (hardcover US ed.)
- OCLC: 551199480
- LC Class: PS3615.B73 T54 2011

The Tiger's Wife is the debut novel of American writer Téa Obreht. It was published in 2011 by Weidenfeld & Nicolson, a British imprint of Orion Books, in the United Kingdom and by Random House in the United States. Set in mid 20th-century to early 21st-century Balkans, it explores inter-generational dynamics between members of a medical family, and how they were involved in several wars throughout the timeframe.

Obreht won the 2011 Orange Prize for Fiction for The Tiger's Wife, becoming the youngest winner of the prize to date, at age 25. The novel was finalist for the National Book Award for Fiction and the Dylan Thomas Prize.

== Story ==
The Tiger's Wife is set in an unnamed country in the Balkans, spanning the mid 20th-century to the early 21st century. It features a young doctor's relationship with her grandfather and the stories he tells her. Her grandfather retells stories about the "deathless man" who meets him several times in different places and who doesn't die, regardless of the danger he faces; and a deaf-mute girl from his childhood village who befriends a tiger that has escaped from a nearby zoo.

== Background ==
The novel was largely written while Obreht was attending Cornell University. Portions of the novel were excerpted in The New Yorker in June 2009. When Obreht was asked to summarize the story by a university journalist, she replied, "It's a family saga that takes place in a fictionalized province of the Balkans. It’s about a female narrator and her relationship to her grandfather, who's a doctor. It's a saga about doctors and their relationships to death throughout all these wars in the Balkans."

== Reception ==
The poet Charles Simic wrote in The New York Review of Books that The Tiger's Wife "is a remarkable first novel". Simic went on to say, "Téa Obreht is an extraordinarily talented writer, skilled at combining different types of narrative — from objective depiction of events to stories mixing the fabulous and the real — in a way that brings to mind the novels of Mikhail Bulgakov, Gabriel García Márquez, and Milorad Pavić, the Serbian author of Dictionary of the Khazars." A review in The New Zealand Herald notes that, "Reviewers have praised Obreht's vibrant imagery and skilful interweaving of fact and folklore, ritual and superstition. British paper the Sunday Times dubbed her 'a compelling new voice'; its rival the Daily Telegraph 'a natural born storyteller'." The New York Times reviewer Liesl Schillinger praised the novel, asserting that it was "filled with astonishing immediacy and presence, fleshed out with detail that seems firsthand."

== Awards ==
The Tiger's Wife won the Orange Prize for Fiction in 2011. The annual prize, recognising "excellence, originality and accessibility in women's writing from throughout the world", then included £30,000 in cash and the "Bessie", a limited edition bronze figurine. At 25, Obreht was the youngest winner of the Orange Prize at the time of her award.

In 2011 Obreht was also a finalist for the National Book Award for Fiction and the Dylan Thomas Prize for English-language writers age 18 to 30.
