= The Age of Miracles =

2012 novel by Karen Thompson Walker

- Author: Karen Thompson Walker
- Published: June 2012; Random House (US); Simon & Schuster (UK)
- Publication place: United States
- Pages: 294
- ISBN: 0812983602

The Age of Miracles is the debut novel by the American writer Karen Thompson Walker. It was published in June 2012 by Random House in the United States and Simon & Schuster in the United Kingdom. The book chronicles the fictional phenomenon of "slowing", in which one Earth day begins to stretch out and take longer and longer to complete. The novel received positive reviews and publishing deals totaling £1.12 million (£1.61 million today), and has been translated into a number of languages. The book was nominated as part of the Waterstones 11 literary award in 2012.

== Background ==
The idea for the "slowing" first came to Walker when she read that the 2004 Indonesia tsunami had caused the Earth's rotation to slow by some fractions of a second. Walker started researching the effects of a more large-scale slowing, mostly on the Internet, but also had it verified by an astrophysicist. As she was working full-time as an editor at Simon & Schuster, she took to writing in the mornings. Although it took her four years to complete the book, Walker enjoyed writing this way, calling it a "type of meditation." Walker said that Blindness by José Saramago was one of the books that inspired her to write The Age of Miracles.

== Plot ==
The story begins with Julia, an eleven-year-old girl, who lives in California. A few months before her birthday, the world undergoes an unexplained phenomenon known only as "slowing", in which the completion of each revolution of the Earth on its axis takes drastically longer. By the time it is confirmed by the experts, a "day" is 24 hours and 56 minutes. The hours steadily increase and dramatically alter life on Earth. Reactions differ: while some try to adapt with it, others, like Julia's grandfather, believe "slowing" to be a government hoax and still others, like Julia's best friend Hanna's family, believe it to be God's wrath and return to their hometowns.

After weeks of chaos, the American government announces the adoption of "clock time", in which the world functions as normal according to the 24-hour clock, regardless of whether it is day or night outside. Some people reject clock time altogether, like Julia's neighbor Sylvia, and set their lives according to the sun, ignoring clock time altogether. These people are labelled "real timers" and they face discrimination. Meanwhile, the longer days have started to have psychological effects on people: Julia's mother starts suffering from a slowing-related disorder, which is referred to as "the syndrome", its effects vary from person to person. Crime rates begin to spike and people purportedly become more impulsive, the excuse Julia uses to convince herself when she finds her father having an affair with Sylvia.

Additionally, Julia's grandfather goes missing on her twelfth birthday. Julia tries her best to adapt to her new life. Feeling lonely since Hanna's departure and her subsequent indifference, she strikes up a friendship with her long-time crush, Seth Moreno, and they eventually start a relationship. Eventually, Julia's grandfather is found, dead, after having tripped and fallen into his nuclear-proof cellar. This is the catalyst for Julia's father to end his relationship with Sylvia and form a better bond with his wife.

In the meantime, a thinning of the Earth's magnetosphere due to the slowing rotation causes solar superstorms to strike the Earth. The resulting radiation causes "the syndrome" to become more severe. As a result, Seth becomes victim of a more aggressive form of the syndrome that nearly kills him. Seth's father decides to take him to Mexico, where the symptoms are supposedly less fatal. Julia receives one last email from Seth after his reaching Mexico, but soon after, America is hit by a 72-hour black out because of excessive electricity usage to artificially grow crops. Subsequently, the government allows electricity use only for life-supporting activities. Julia is never able to reach Seth despite several letters to an address he left her.

The last chapter skips to years ahead. By this time, a day stretches into weeks and the human race will soon become extinct. The government launches The Explorer, a spaceship that contains memoirs of life on Earth. Julia reveals that she never heard from Seth since his last email, but still maintains hopeful that they will be reunited one day. The book ends with her reminiscing about the words she and Seth had written on wet cement one summer day: "We were here".

== Reception ==
The Age of Miracles received mostly positive reviews from critics. Michiko Kakutani of The New York Times hailed the book as a "clever mash-up of disaster epic with sensitive young-adult, coming-of-age story" despite noting its "made-for-Hollywood slickness" and some wayward plot developments. In Entertainment Weekly Melissa Maerz agreed with Kakutani on the book's strengths, giving it an "A−" and praising it as "lovely, because of its simple writing and quiet moments." NPR's Maureen Corrigan also enjoyed the book, writing: "The Age of Miracles is a pensive page-turner that meditates on loss and the fragility of both our planetary and personal ecosystems.". The Daily Telegraph critic Claudia Yusef focused on the emotional aspect of the book, opining that the slowing was "the basis for a startlingly evocative portrayal of the beauty and horror of adolescence" and that "quibbl[ing] with the physics, seems futile." Writing for The Huffington Post, Abigail Tarttelin praised the book's "light, ephemeral touch", calling it "a very enjoyable book", but felt the book was not as dramatic as the setting required. In a starred review, Kirkus Reviews called the novel a "stunning debut" as well as "riveting, heartbreaking, profoundly moving." Becky Toyne of The Globe and Mail felt the consequences of the slowing read "too much like a catalogue" and the narrator's refrain too repetitive, but nevertheless summed up the book as "touching and harrowing, but above all magical." In her Washington Post review, Jackie Stewart, felt the book's literary techniques to be "heavy-handed" and the descriptions "awkward", but ended with: "On the whole, 'The Age of Miracles' is a dark and beautiful book that follows the trials and tribulations of one child ... and also tracks society's reaction to a bizarre natural disaster." However, writing for The Guardian, Christopher Priest slammed the book for its "total lack of irony, awareness of the larger world [and] characterization done by the numbers" and further highlighted the scientific fallacies in the book.
