= List of University of East Anglia alumni =

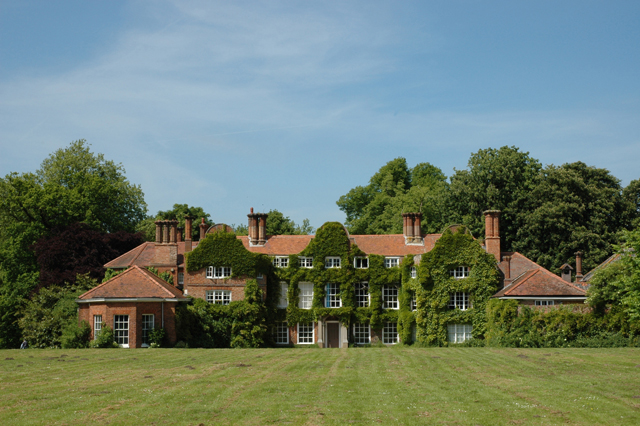
Earlham Hall, home to UEA Law School

This List of University of East Anglia alumni includes graduates and non-graduate former students of the University of East Anglia. The list includes one current monarch and former prime minister, two de facto heads of state, one vice president, one deputy prime minister, and two former Leaders of the House of Lords. The list also includes two Nobel laureates in Physiology or Medicine, one president of the Royal Society, two Lasker Award winners, and a further 15 fellows of the Royal Society. Literary alumni include one Nobel laureate in Literature, three Booker Prize winners, and three Caine Prize winners.

== Politics and government ==
=== Heads of state and government ===
| Name | Class year | Notability | Reference(s) |
|---|---|---|---|
| Sir Robert Fulton | BA, 1970 | Governor of Gibraltar (2006–2009) and Commandant General Royal Marines | |
| Sir Carlyle Glean | MA, 1982 | Governor-General of Grenada (2008–2013) | |
| Tupou VI | BA, 1980 | King of Tonga (2012–present) and Prime Minister of Tonga (2000–2006) | |

=== United Kingdom ===
| Name | Class year | Notability | Reference(s) |
|---|---|---|---|
| Valerie Amos, Baroness Amos | Applied Research in Education, 1978 | Leader of the House of Lords (2003–2007) | |
| Douglas Carswell | BA, 1993 | Conservative and UKIP Member of Parliament | |
| Judith Chaplin | DipEcon | Conservative Member of Parliament | |
| Tony Colman | MA, 2009; PhD, 2013 | Labour Member of Parliament | |
| Caroline Flint | BA, 1983 | Labour Member of Parliament | |
| Michael Heaver | BA, 2011 | Brexit Party Member of the European Parliament | |
| Jon Owen Jones | BSc, 1975 | Labour Member of Parliament | |
| Tess Kingham | PGCE, 1987 | Labour Member of Parliament | |
| Rachael Maskell | BSc, 1994 | Labour Member of Parliament | |
| Brian Mathew | BA, 1983 | Liberal Democrat Member of Parliament | |
| Manuela Perteghella | MA, 2000; PhD, 2006 | Liberal Democrat Member of Parliament | |
| Timothy Bentinck, 12th Earl of Portland | BA, 1975 | Crossbench Peer and actor | |
| Peter Prinsley | MD | Labour Member of Parliament | |
| Murad Qureshi | BA, 1987 | Labour Member of the London Assembly | |
| Adrian Ramsay | BA, 2002; MA, 2005 | Green Party Member of Parliament and former co-leader | |
| Connor Rand | BA, 2014 | Labour Member of Parliament | |
| Sam Rushworth | MRes, 2011; PhD, 2018 | Labour Member of Parliament | |
| Rosalind Scott, Baroness Scott of Needham Market | BA, 1999 | Liberal Democrat Peer | |
| Karin Smyth | BA, 1988 | Labour Member of Parliament | |
| Ivor Stanbrook | PhD, 1995 | Conservative Member of Parliament | |
| Thomas Galbraith, 2nd Baron Strathclyde | BA, 1982 | Leader of the House of Lords (2010–2013) | |
| David Thomas | BA, 1993 | Labour Member of the European Parliament | |
| Adam Tomkins | LLB, 1990 | Conservative Member of the Scottish Parliament | |

=== Europe ===
| Name | Class year | Notability | Reference(s) |
|---|---|---|---|
| Rubina Berardo | BA, 2003 | Member of the Portuguese Assembly of the Republic | |
| Hugh Bronson | MA; PhD, 2001 | Member of the Abgeordnetenhaus of Berlin | |
| Marios Demetriades | BSc, 1993 | Cypriot Transport Minister | |
| Françoise Dupuis | MA, 1967 | President of the Brussels Regional Parliament | |
| Össur Skarphéðinsson | PhD, 1983 | Icelandic Foreign Minister | |

=== Middle East ===
| Name | Class year | Notability | Reference(s) |
|---|---|---|---|
| Mohamed Ali Hasan Ali | MSc, 1987; PhD, 1994 | Member of the Bahraini Consultative Council | |
| Serwan Baban | PhD, 1991 | Kurdish Cabinet Minister | |
| Saeed Qasim Al-Khalidi Al-Maliki | MSc, 2002; PhD 2006 | Member of the Consultative Assembly of Saudi Arabia | |
| Mansour bin Attia bin Mohammed Al-Mazrouei | PhD, 2006 | Member of the Consultative Assembly of Saudi Arabia | |
| Yahya Al-Mutawakel | PhD, 1992 | Yemeni Trade Minister | |
| Hilal Al Sarmi | MA | Member of the Consultative Assembly of Oman | |
| Tariq bin Saeed bin Hilail Al-Shammari | PhD, 2016 | Member of the Consultative Assembly of Saudi Arabia | |

=== Asia ===
| Name | Class year | Notability | Reference(s) |
|---|---|---|---|
| José Abel | MSc, 2004 | East Timorese Secretary of State | |
| Mariyam Azra | MA, 1998 | Maldivian Minister of State | |
| Anil Baijal | MA | Lieutenant Governor of Delhi | |
| Nomin Chinbat | BA, 2006 | Mongolian Cabinet Minister | |
| Cüneyd Düzyol | MA, 1993 | Turkish Cabinet Minister | |
| Hala Hameed | MPhil, 1993; PhD, 2004 | Maldivian Minister of State | |
| Choida Jamtsho | MSc, 2006 | Member of the Bhutanese National Assembly | |
| Cheng Kai-nam | BA, 1988 | Member of the Legislative Council of Hong Kong | |
| Murat Karayalçın | MA, 1977 | Deputy Prime Minister of Turkey and Turkish Foreign Minister | |
| T. M. Mannen | MA, 1989 | Member of the Nagaland Legislative Assembly | |
| Martin Manurung | MA, 2007 | Member of the Indonesian People's Representative Council | |
| Suyoi Osman | BA, 1975 | Bruneian Education and Health Minister | |
| Adam Shareef | MA, 2008 | Maldivian Defence Minister | |
| Salbiah Sulaiman | BA, 1978 | Member of the Legislative Council of Brunei | |
| Suchart Thada-Thamrongvech | DipEcon | Thai Finance Minister | |
| Wan Hisham | BSc, 1979 | Malaysian State Assemblyman | |
| Adanan Yusof | BA | Bruneian Home Affairs and Health Minister | |

=== Oceania ===
| Name | Class year | Notability | Reference(s) |
|---|---|---|---|
| Mathias Cormann | Law, 1994 | Australian Finance Minister and Secretary-General of the OECD | |
| Dee Margetts | BA, 1982 | Senator for Western Australia | |
| Teima Onorio | MA, 1990 | Vice President of Kiribati | |

=== Americas ===
| Name | Class year | Notability | Reference(s) |
|---|---|---|---|
| Alvin Bernard | MA | Member of the Dominican House of Assembly | |
| Julio Boltvinik | MA, 1973 | Member of the Mexican Chamber of Deputies | |
| Gino Costa | MA, 1983 | Peruvian Interior Minister | |
| Óscar González Rodríguez | MA, 1974; PhD, 1980 | Member of the Mexican Chamber of Deputies | |
| Daniel Kagan | Politics, 1973 | Member of the Colorado Senate | |
| Manuel Lajo | PhD, 1987 | Member of the Peruvian Congress | |
| Pedro Rosas Bravo | MSc, 1978 | Venezuelan Finance Minister | |

=== Africa ===
| Name | Class year | Notability | Reference(s) |
|---|---|---|---|
| Gamal El-Araby | MA | Egyptian Education Minister | |
| Manuel de Araújo | PhD, 2011 | Member of the Mozambican Assembly of the Republic | |
| Syda Bbumba | | Ugandan Finance Minister | |
| Aimé Boji | MA, 1997 | President of the National Assembly of the Democratic Republic of the Congo | |
| Sinknesh Ejigu | MSc, 1988 | Ethiopian Cabinet Minister | |
| Daphrose Gahakwa | MSc, 1997; PhD, 2001 | Rwandan Education Minister | |
| Zuwera Ibrahimah | MA | Ghanaian Member of Parliament | |
| Ousman Jammeh | MA, 1984 | Gambian Foreign Minister | |
| Asha Abdullah Juma | MA, 2000 | Member of the Tanzanian National Assembly | |
| Donald Kaberuka | MPhil, 1979 | President of the African Development Bank and Rwandan Finance Minister | |
| Rosebud Kurwijila | MPhil, 1994 | African Union Commissioner | |
| Agnes Kwaje Lasuba | BA, 1990; MSc, 1991 | South Sudanese Cabinet Minister | |
| Alie Badara Mansaray | MA, 2005 | Sierra Leonean National Commissioner for Social Action | |
| Eddie Mbadiwe | PhD, 1975 | Member of the Nigerian House of Representatives | |
| Tito Mboweni | MA, 1988 | Governor of the South African Reserve Bank and South African Labour Minister | |
| Juma Ngasongwa | PhD, 1988 | Tanzanian Trade Minister | |
| Rolph Payet | BSc, 1992 | Seychellois Cabinet Minister | |
| Junedin Sado | PgDip, 1987 | Ethiopian Cabinet Minister | |
| Peter Sinon | BA, 1990; MA, 1996 | Seychellois Cabinet Minister | |
| Stone Sizani | MA, 1995 | Member of the South African National Assembly | |
| Hassan Wario | MA, 1998; PhD, 2013 | Kenyan Cabinet Minister | |
| Yusuf Abubakar Yusuf | MA, 1983 | Member of the Nigerian Senate | |

=== Diplomats ===
| Name | Class year | Notability | Reference(s) |
|---|---|---|---|
| Aníbal de Castro | BA, 1979 | Dominican Republic Ambassador to the United States | |
| Albert Chua | BA, 1990 | Singaporean Permanent Representative to the United Nations | |
| Shofry Abdul Ghafor | BA, 1981 | Bruneian Permanent Representative to the United Nations | |
| Alan Hunt | BA, 1970 | UK High Commissioner to Singapore | |
| Arjun Karki | PhD, 2001 | Nepali Ambassador to the United States | |
| Abubakarr Multi-Kamara | MA, 1982 | Sierra Leonean Ambassador to China | |
| Philip Priestley | BA, 1968 | UK Ambassador to Gabon and UK High Commissioner to Belize | |
| Soehardjono Sastromihardjo | MA, 1994 | Indonesian Ambassador to Cambodia and Kenya | |
| Ingebjørg Støfring | MA, 1987 | Norwegian Ambassador to Bangladesh and Zimbabwe | |

== Science and academia ==
=== Sciences, public health and policy ===
| Name | Class year | Notability | Reference(s) |
|---|---|---|---|
| Ibrahim Abubakar | PhD, 2007 | Director of the UCL Institute for Global Health | |
| Neil Adger | PhD, 1998 | Professor of Human Geography at the University of Exeter | |
| Franklin Aigbirhio | BSc, 1984 | Professor of Molecular Imaging Chemistry at the University of Cambridge | |
| James Barber | MSc, 1965; PhD, 1967 | Ernst Chain Professor of Biochemistry at Imperial College London | |
| Rebecca Barthelmie | PhD | Atmospheric scientist | |
| Nick Barton | PhD, 1979 | Darwin Medal, Darwin–Wallace Medal and Erwin Schrödinger Prize–winning evolutionary biologist | |
| Martin Beniston | BSc, 1973 | Climate scientist | |
| Sir John Beringer | PhD, 1973 | Emeritus professor at the University of Bristol | |
| Keith Beven | PhD, 1975 | Robert E. Horton Medal–winning hydrologist | |
| Mervyn Bibb | BSc, 1974; PhD, 1978 | Molecular microbiologist | |
| Alan Bishop | BSc | Ernest Orlando Lawrence Award–winning scientist | |
| David Blair | PhD, 1973 | Physicist and co-founder of the Gravity Discovery Centre | |
| Robert Boutilier | PhD, 1981 | Lecturer in Zoology at the University of Cambridge | |
| Keith Briffa | BSC; PhD, 1984 | Climatologist | |
| Dennis Brown | BSc, 1972; PhD, 1975 | Professor of Medicine at Harvard Medical School | |
| Kevin Burgess | MSc, 1980 | Rachal Professor of Chemistry at Texas A&M University | |
| Lucy Carpenter | PhD, 1996 | Rosalind Franklin Award–winning physical chemist | |
| Tony Carr | BSc, 1981 | Director of the Genome Damage and Stability Centre at the University of Sussex | |
| Ken Carslaw | MSc, 1991; PhD, 1994 | Professor of Atmospheric Science at the University of Leeds | |
| Sir Andrew Cash | BA | Chief executive of Sheffield Teaching Hospitals NHS Foundation Trust | |
| Gavin Crooks | BSc, 1992; MSc, 1993 | Discoverer of Crooks fluctuation theorem | |
| Christopher Cullis | MSc, 1968; PhD, 1971 | Francis Hobart Herrick Professor of Biology at Case Western Reserve University | |
| Huw Davies | PhD, 1980 | Asa Griggs Candler Professor of Organic Chemistry at Emory University | |
| Karen Duff | BSc, 1987 | Potamkin Prize–winning pathologist | |
| Nick Dulvy | PhD, 1998 | Professor of Marine Biodiversity & Conservation at Simon Fraser University | |
| Julian Eastoe | BSc, 1986; PhD, 1990 | Professor of Chemistry at the University of Bristol | |
| Nick Eyles | PhD, 1978 | E. R. Ward Neale Medal–winning geologist | |
| Marcus Flather | MBA, 2016 | Cardiologist and expert in clinical trials | |
| Richard Flavell | PhD, 1967 | Director of the John Innes Centre | |
| Lynne Frostick | PhD, 1975 | President of the Geological Society of London | |
| Dame Sarah Gilbert | BSc, 1983 | Saïd Professor of Vaccinology at the University of Oxford and Project Lead on the Oxford–AstraZeneca COVID-19 vaccine | |
| Beverley Glover | PhD, 1996 | Bicentenary Medal–winning botanist | |
| Don Grierson | BSc, 1967 | Emeritus professor at the University of Nottingham | |
| Jane Hart | PhD, 1987 | Professor of Physical Geography at the University of Southampton | |
| Louise Heathwaite | BSc, 1982 | Hydrochemist | |
| Martin Heeney | PhD, 1990 | Professor of Organic Materials at Imperial College London | |
| Brian Hemmings | PhD, 1975 | Cloëtta Prize–winning biochemist | |
| Sir Michael Houghton | BSc, 1972 | 2020 Nobel Prize in Physiology or Medicine laureate and co-discoverer of Hepatitis C and of the Hepatitis D genome | |
| Keith Hunter | PhD, 1977 | Marsden Medal–winning marine chemist | |
| Tony James | BSc, 1986 | Daiwa Adrian Prize–winning chemist | |
| David Jones | PhD, 1965 | Flavelle Medal–winning biologist | |
| Andrew J. Jordan | PhD, 1997 | Director of the Tyndall Centre | |
| Dame Emily Lawson | PhD, 1993 | Head of the NHS COVID-19 vaccine programme | |
| Simon Leather | PhD, 1980 | Professor of Entomology at Harper Adams University | |
| Tim Lenton | PhD, 1998 | Professor of Climate Change and Earth System Science at the University of Exeter | |
| Neil McKeown | BSc, 1984; PhD, 1987 | Beilby Medal and Prize and Tilden Prize–winning chemist | |
| Nicholas Mills | BSc, 1976; PhD, 1979 | Professor of Insect Population Ecology at the University of California, Berkeley | |
| Richard Nichols | PhD, 1984 | Professor of Evolutionary Genetics at Queen Mary University of London | |
| Sir Paul Nurse | PhD, 1973 | 2001 Nobel Prize in Physiology or Medicine laureate and President of the Royal Society | |
| Giles Oldroyd | BA, 1994 | Plant scientist | |
| Timothy Osborn | BSc, 1990; PhD, 1995 | Director of the Climatic Research Unit | |
| Julian Pearce | PhD, 1973 | Bigsby Medal and Murchison Medal–winning geochemist | |
| Marion Petrie | PhD, 1982 | Emeritus professor at Newcastle University | |
| Terence Rabbitts | BSc, 1968 | Colworth Medal–winning molecular biologist | |
| Clive Randall | BSc, 1983 | Distinguished Professor of Materials Science and Engineering at Pennsylvania State University | |
| Sarah Raper | BSc, 1974; PhD, 1978 | Climatologist | |
| Michael G. Ritchie | PhD, 1988 | Evolutionary biologist | |
| David Rogers | BSc, 1980 | Chief executive of the Met Office | |
| Benjamin Santer | BSc, 1984; PhD, 1987 | Ernest Orlando Lawrence Award–winning atmospheric scientist | |
| Nicole Steinmetz | PhD, 2007 | Professor of Chemical and Nano Engineering at the University of California, San Diego | |
| Nicola Stonehouse | BSc | Professor in Molecular Virology at the University of Leeds | |
| William Sutherland | BSc | President of the British Ecological Society | |
| Rihab Taha | PhD, 1984 | Microbiologist who worked on Saddam Hussein's biological weapons program | |
| Nick Talbot | PhD, 1990 | Professor of Molecular Genetics at the University of Exeter | |
| Colin Thorne | BSc; PhD, 1978 | Back Award–winning geographer | |
| Peter Thorne | BSc, 1998; PhD, 2001 | IPCC Fifth Assessment Report lead author | |
| Simon Thrush | PhD, 1985 | Director of the Institute of Marine Science at the University of Auckland | |
| Chris Turney | BSc | Bigsby Medal–winning geologist and climatologist | |
| Amarilis de Varennes | PhD, 1985 | President of the Instituto Superior de Agronomia | |
| Rob Varley | BSc, 1983 | Chief executive of the Met Office | |
| Alan Whiteside | MA, 1980 | AIDS researcher | |
| Christopher Wood | PhD, 1974 | Miroslaw Romanowski Medal–winning biologist | |
| John Derek Woollins | BSc, 1976; PhD, 1979 | Professor of Synthetic Chemistry at the University of St Andrews | |
| Deng Zixin | PhD, 1987 | Member of the Chinese Academy of Sciences | |

=== Other academics ===
| Name | Class year | Notability | Reference(s) |
|---|---|---|---|
| David Acheson | PhD, 1971 | President of the Mathematical Association | |
| Mel Ainscow | PhD, 1995 | Professor of Education at the University of Manchester | |
| Franklin Allen | BA, 1977; MPhil, 1979 | Nippon Life Professor of Finance and Economics at the Wharton School of the University of Pennsylvania | |
| Virginia DeJohn Anderson | MA | Historian | |
| John Ashdown-Hill | BA, 1971 | Historian | |
| Diane Atkinson | MA, 2005 | Historian | |
| Judith Baxter | BA, 1976 | Sociolinguist | |
| Deryck Beyleveld | PhD, 1975 | Professor of Law and Bioethics at Durham University | |
| Will Brooker | BA, 1991 | Cultural critic | |
| Andrew Bowie | PhD, 1980 | Professor of Philosophy and German at Royal Holloway, University of London | |
| Peter Buckley | MA, 1970 | Professor of International Business at the University of Leeds | |
| Michael Casey | BA, 1990 | James Wright Professor of Music at Dartmouth College | |
| Steven Casey | BA, 1994 | Professor of International History at the London School of Economics | |
| Mark Coeckelbergh | MA, 1999 | Philosopher of technology | |
| James Delbourgo | BA, 1996 | James Westfall Thompson Distinguished Professor of History at Rutgers University | |
| Selim Deringil | BA, 1975; PhD, 1979 | Historian | |
| Tim Dunne | BA, 1989 | International relations scholar | |
| Glenn Foard | PhD, 2008 | Archaeologist | |
| Charles Freeman | MA, 1978 | Historian | |
| Gerald Gazdar | BA, 1970 | Linguist | |
| Richard Grayson | BA, 1991 | Professor of Twentieth Century History at Goldsmiths, University of London | |
| Andrew Hemingway | | Emeritus professor of Art History at University College London | |
| Kathryn Hughes | MA, 1987 | Historian | |
| William Hughes | BA, 1985; MA, 1988; PhD, 1992 | Professor of Literature in English University of Macau | |
| William John Hutchins | PhD, 2000 | Linguist | |
| Peter Lamarque | BA, 1970 | Professor of Philosophy at the University of York | |
| Christopher Lane | BA, 1988 | Professor of English at Northwestern University | |
| Robert Lyman | PhD, 2011 | Military historian | |
| Susan Owens | BSc; PhD, 1981 | Professor of Environment and Policy at the University of Cambridge | |
| Judith Phillips | PhD, 1989 | Gerontologist | |
| Andrew Reynolds | BA, 1998 | Political scientist | |
| Peter Stachura | MA, 1968; PhD, 1971 | Historian | |
| June Thoburn | MSW, 1988 | Social work scholar | |
| Sir Alan Tuckett | BA, 1969 | Educationist | |
| Graeme Turner | PhD, 1976 | Cultural historian | |
| Ginette Vincendeau | PhD, 1985 | Professor of Film Studies at King's College London | |
| Richard Webster | BA, 1972 | Cultural historian | |
| Marysia Zalewski | BA, 1988 | International relations scholar | |

=== Academic administrators ===
| Name | Class year | Notability | Reference(s) |
|---|---|---|---|
| Asaf Savaş Akat | MA, 1968 | Rector of Istanbul Bilgi University | |
| Robin Baker | PhD, 1984 | Vice-chancellor of Canterbury Christ Church University and the University of Chichester | |
| Rick Caulfield | PhD, 1993 | Chancellor of the University of Alaska Southeast | |
| Carl Lygo | LLM, 1991 | Vice-chancellor of Arden University | |
| Margaret Muthwii | MA, 1986; PhD, 1994 | Vice-chancellor of Pan Africa Christian University | |
| Ahmed Nasri | PhD, 1985 | President of Fahd bin Sultan University | |
| Mike Rands | BSc, 1978 | Master of Darwin College, Cambridge | |
| John Saka | PhD, 1985 | Vice-chancellor of the University of Malawi and Mzuzu University | |
| Ji-Liang Tang | PhD, 1989 | President of Guangxi University | |
| Paul Thompson | MA, 1984; PhD, 1987 | Chair of the British Council and Rector of the Royal College of Art | |
| Ibrahim Umar | PhD, 1974 | Vice-chancellor of Bayero University Kano | |
| Primitivo Viray | MA; PhD, 1999 | President of Ateneo de Naga University | |
| Paul Wellings | PhD, 1980 | Vice-chancellor of the University of Wollongong and the University of Lancaster | |

== Literature ==
=== Booker Prize winners ===
| Name | Class year | Notability | Reference(s) |
|---|---|---|---|
| Anne Enright | MA, 1988 | Booker Prize–winning author | |
| Sir Kazuo Ishiguro | MA, 1980 | 2017 Nobel Prize in Literature laureate and Booker Prize–winning author | |
| Ian McEwan | MA, 1971 | Booker Prize–winning author | |

=== Caine Prize winners ===
| Name | Class year | Notability | Reference(s) |
|---|---|---|---|
| Helon Habila | PhD, 2008 | Caine Prize–winning novelist | |
| Henrietta Rose-Innes | PhD | Caine Prize–winning novelist | |
| Binyavanga Wainaina | MPhil, 2010 | Caine Prize–winning novelist | |

=== Other writers ===
| Name | Class year | Notability | Reference(s) |
|---|---|---|---|
| Matthew De Abaitua | MA, 1994 | Writer | |
| Annabel Abbs | BA | Writer | |
| Ayobami Adebayo | MA, 2014 | Writer | |
| Anita Agnihotri | MSc | Writer | |
| Naomi Alderman | MA, 2003 | Novelist | |
| Nicholas Allan | MA, 1981 | Children's author | |
| David Almond | BA, 1973 | Whitbread Book Award–winning children's author | |
| Ali Almossawi | BSc, 2005 | Writer | |
| Julie Ann Amos | BSc, 1983 | Writer | |
| Princess Anna of Bavaria | MA | Political biographer | |
| Árni Þórarinsson | BA, 1973 | Writer | |
| Mona Arshi | MA, 2010 | Poet | |
| Tash Aw | MA, 2003 | Whitbread Book Award–winning novelist | |
| Trezza Azzopardi | MA, 1998 | Novelist | |
| Urvashi Bahuguna | MA, 2014 | Poet and essayist | |
| John Bainbridge | BA, 1992 | Author | |
| Ayanna Lloyd Banwo | MA, 2017 | Author | |
| Sebastian Barker | MA, 1970 | Poet | |
| Paul Batchelor | MA, 2000 | Poet | |
| Martyn Bedford | MA, 1994 | Novelist | |
| Julia Bell | MA | Novelist | |
| Brett Ellen Block | MA, 1998 | Author | |
| Peter Bowker | MA, 1991 | Screenwriter | |
| Tim Bowler | BA, 1972 | Novelist | |
| John Boyne | MA, 1996 | Novelist | |
| Jon Brittain | BA, 2008 | Playwright | |
| Keith Brooke | BSc, 1987 | Writer | |
| Stephen Buoro | MA, 2019 | Novelist | |
| Sam Byers | MA, 2004; PhD, 2014 | Novelist | |
| Aifric Campbell | MA, 2003; PhD, 2007 | Writer | |
| Anthony Cartwright | BA, 1996 | Novelist | |
| Christopher Catherwood | PhD, 2006 | Author | |
| Gillian Chan | BEd, 1980 | Children's author | |
| Tracy Chevalier | MA, 1994 | Historical novelist | |
| Suzanne Cleminshaw | PhD, 1991 | Writer | |
| Mark Cocker | BA, 1982 | Author | |
| Stephen Cole | BA, 1992 | Writer | |
| David Connolly | PhD, 1997 | Literary translator | |
| Peter J. Conradi | BA, 1967 | Writer | |
| Judy Corbalis | MA, 1990 | Novelist | |
| Sarah Corbett | MA, 1999 | Poet | |
| Andrew Cowan | MA, 1985 | Novelist | |
| Nick Crittenden | PhD | Writer | |
| Helen Cross | MA, 1998 | Novelist | |
| Fflur Dafydd | MA, 2000 | Writer | |
| Shon Dale-Jones | BA, 1990 | Writer | |
| Donna Daley-Clarke | MA, 2001 | Novelist | |
| Louise Doughty | MA, 1987 | Novelist | |
| Ruth Dugdall | MA | Novelist | |
| Suzannah Dunn | MA, 1989 | Novelist | |
| Joe Dunthorne | BA, 2004; MA, 2005 | Novelist | |
| Susan Elderkin | MA, 1994 | Author | |
| Oliver Emanuel | MA, 2002 | Playwright | |
| Diana Evans | MA, 2003 | Novelist | |
| Fadia Faqir | PhD, 1990 | Author | |
| Stephen Finucan | MA, 1996 | Short story writer | |
| Susan Fletcher | MA, 2002 | Whitbread Book Award–winning novelist | |
| David Flusfeder | MA, 1988 | Author | |
| Adam Foulds | MA, 2001 | Costa Book Award–winning poet | |
| Bo Fowler | MA, 1995 | Novelist | |
| Sue Gee | PhD, 2007 | Novelist | |
| Ruth Gilligan | MA, 2011 | Writer | |
| Jim Goar | PhD, 2012 | Poet | |
| Imogen Hermes Gowar | BA; MA | Author | |
| Nigel Gray | MA, 1983 | Author | |
| Tim Guest | MA, 1999 | Author | |
| Mohammed Hanif | MA, 2005 | Writer | |
| Graeme Harper | PhD, 1997 | Writer | |
| Jane Harris | MA, 1992; PhD, 1995 | Novelist and screenwriter | |
| Alix Hawley | MA, 2002 | Novelist | |
| Emma Healey | MA, 2011 | Costa Book Award–winning novelist | |
| Amanda Hodgkinson | MA, 2001 | Novelist | |
| Edward Hogan | MA, 2004 | Novelist | |
| Emma Hooper | PhD, 2010 | Writer | |
| Richard House | PhD, 2008 | Author | |
| Naomi Ishiguro | MFA | Author | |
| Mick Jackson | MA, 1992 | Novelist | |
| Christopher James | MA, 2000 | Poet | |
| Andrew Jefford | MA, 1981 | Journalist and author | |
| Marie-Louise Jensen | BA, 1986 | Children's author | |
| Anjali Joseph | MA, 2008; PhD | Author | |
| Avril Joy | BA, 1972 | Costa Book Award–winning author | |
| Panos Karnezis | MA, 2000 | Novelist | |
| Tadzio Koelb | MA, 2008 | Novelist | |
| Muhammad Mojlum Khan | BA, 1994 | Writer | |
| Larissa Lai | MA, 2001 | Novelist | |
| Hernán Lara Zavala | MA, 1981 | Novelist | |
| Joanna Laurens | MA, 2003 | Playwright | |
| Ágnes Lehóczky | MA, 2006; PhD, 2010 | Poet | |
| Frances Liardet | MA, 2000 | Translator of Arabic literature | |
| Steve Lightfoot | MA | Screenwriter | |
| Toby Litt | MA, 1995 | Novelist | |
| Philip MacCann | MA | Writer | |
| Deirdre Madden | MA, 1985 | Novelist | |
| Robert McGill | MA, 2002 | Writer | |
| Laura McGloughlin | MA, 2007 | Literary translator | |
| Nalin Mehta | MA, 2003 | Writer | |
| Sarah Emily Miano | MA, 2002; PhD, 2007 | Author | |
| Andrew Miller | MA, 1991 | Costa Book Award–winning novelist | |
| Lucasta Miller | PhD, 2007 | Writer and journalist | |
| Tom Moran | BA, 2009 | Writer | |
| Esther Morgan | MA, 1998 | Poet | |
| Tom Morton-Smith | BA, 2001 | Playwright | |
| Charles Moseley | PhD, 1971 | Writer | |
| Syed Askar Mousavi | BA, 1987 | Writer | |
| Neel Mukherjee | MA, 2001 | Novelist | |
| Paul Murray | MA, 2001 | Novelist | |
| Sandra Newman | MA, 2002 | Writer | |
| Ng Yi-Sheng | MA, 2014 | Writer and poet | |
| Timothy Ogene | MA | Poet and novelist | |
| Tolu Ogunlesi | MA, 2011 | Writer and journalist | |
| Nessa O'Mahony | MA, 2003 | Poet and writer | |
| Troy Onyango | MA | Writer | |
| John Osborne | BA, 2000 | Writer and poet | |
| Kathy Page | MA, 1988 | Novelist | |
| Sandeep Parmar | MA | Poet | |
| Glenn Patterson | MA, 1986 | Novelist | |
| Christine Pountney | MA, 1997 | Author | |
| Natasha Pulley | MA, 2012 | Author | |
| Rory Power | MA | Author | |
| Dina Rabinovitch | MA, 2000 | Journalist and writer | |
| Mario Reading | EUR, 1972 | Novelist | |
| Eleanor Rees | MA, 2002 | Poet | |
| Ben Rice | MA, 2000 | Novelist | |
| Sam Riviere | PhD, 2013 | Poet | |
| Eliza Robertson | MA, 2012 | Writer | |
| Monique Roffey | BA, 1987 | Writer | |
| Tatiana de Rosnay | BA, 1984 | Writer | |
| Anthony Sattin | MA, 1984 | Writer | |
| Simon Scarrow | MA, 1992 | Author | |
| James Scudamore | MA, 2004 | Novelist | |
| W. G. Sebald | PhD, 1973 | Writer | |
| Owen Sheers | MA, 1998 | Author, poet and playwright | |
| Jeremy Sheldon | MA, 1996 | Novelist | |
| Robert Sheppard | MA, 1979 | Poet | |
| Guillermo Sheridan | MA, 1986 | Literary critic | |
| Elizabeth L. Silver | MA, 2004 | Writer | |
| Kathryn Simmonds | MA, 2002 | Poet | |
| Clive Sinclair | BA, 1969; PhD, 1983 | Novelist | |
| Alexander Gordon Smith | BA, 2003 | Novelist | |
| Rob Magnuson Smith | MA | Novelist | |
| Erin Soros | PhD, 2014 | Author | |
| Paul Stewart | MA, 1979 | Writer | |
| Margaret Stohl | MA, 1988 | Writer | |
| Jon Stone | BA, 2004 | Poet | |
| Andrea Stuart | BA, 1984 | Writer | |
| Julia Stuart | MA, 2013 | Novelist | |
| Todd Swift | MA, 2004 | Poet | |
| Hwee Hwee Tan | BA, 1995 | Novelist | |
| Mark Tilton | MA, 1997 | Screenwriter | |
| Carol Topolski | MA, 2004 | Novelist | |
| Dame Rose Tremain | BA, 1967 | Whitbread Book Award–winning novelist | |
| Erica Wagner | MA, 1991 | Author and literary editor of The Times | |
| Martin Walls | BA, 1989 | Poet | |
| Craig Warner | MA, 2013 | Playwright and screenwriter | |
| Thomas Warner | MA, 2002 | Poet | |
| Christie Watson | MA, 2009 | Costa Book Award–winning novelist | |
| Phil Whitaker | MA, 1996 | Novelist | |
| Matt Whyman | MA, 1992 | Novelist | |
| Clare Wigfall | MA, 2000 | Writer | |
| Luke Williams | MA, 2002 | Author | |
| D. W. Wilson | MA, 2010; PhD, 2014 | Author | |
| Snoo Wilson | BA, 1969 | Playwright | |
| Jennifer Wong | MA, 2009 | Writer and poet | |
| Gregory Woods | BA, 1974; MA, 1975; PhD, 1983 | Poet and author | |
| Luke Wright | BA, 2003 | Poet | |
| Anna Ziegler | MA, 2002 | Playwright | |

== Arts ==
=== Actors ===
| Name | Class year | Notability | Reference(s) |
|---|---|---|---|
| Roger Ashton-Griffiths | PhD, 2015 | Actor | |
| Jack Davenport | BA, 1995 | Actor | |
| Simon Paisley Day | BA | Actor | |
| Leena Dhingra | MA, 1991; PhD, 2001 | Actress | |
| James Frain | BA, 1990 | Actor | |
| Michael Hobbs | | Actor | |
| Jennifer Kirby | BA, 2010 | Actress | |
| Matt Milne | BA, 2011 | Actor | |
| Annabel Mullion | BA, 1991 | Actress | |
| Andrew Novell | MA, 2003 | Actor | |
| Steve Oram | BA, 1994 | Actor | |
| Vicki Pepperdine | | Actress | |
| Catherine Rabett | BA | Actress | |
| John Rhys-Davies | BA, 1966 | Actor | |
| Jiang Shuying | MSc, 2011 | Actress | |
| Matt Smith | BA, 2005 | Actor | |
| Olivia Vinall | BA, 2010 | Actress | |

=== Comedy ===
| Name | Class year | Notability | Reference(s) |
|---|---|---|---|
| Pat Cahill | | Comedian | |
| Nina Conti | BA, 1995 | Comedian | |
| David Cummings | BA, 1980 | Screenwriter and musician | |
| Simon Day | BA, 1989 | Comedian and actor | |
| Charlie Higson | BA, 1980 | Comedian and author | |
| John Kearns | BA, 2008 | Comedian | |
| Joz Norris | BA, 2010 | Comedian | |
| Arthur Smith | BA, 1976 | Comedian and author | |
| Paul Whitehouse | DEV, 1977 | Comedian | |

=== Film and television ===
| Name | Class year | Notability | Reference(s) |
|---|---|---|---|
| Nan Achnas | MA, 1996 | Film director | |
| Bea Ballard | BA, 1980 | Television producer and executive | |
| Sir Colin Callender | BA, 1973 | President of HBO Films | |
| Gurinder Chadha | BA, 1983 | Film director | |
| Andy Devonshire | BA | Television director and producer | |
| Saul Dibb | BA, 1990 | Film director | |
| Don Homfray | BA, 1999 | BAFTA Award–winning production designer | |
| Stephen Lambert | BA, 1981 | Television producer and executive | |
| David Lemieux | MA, 1999 | Grateful Dead legacy manager, producer, archivist | |
| Amir Muhammad | LLB, 1995 | Film director | |

=== Visual arts ===
| Name | Class year | Notability | Reference(s) |
|---|---|---|---|
| Paul Atterbury | BA, 1972 | Antiques expert | |
| Bendor Grosvenor | BA; PhD, 2009 | Art historian | |
| Dan Harries | MA, 1988 | Artist | |
| Anna Jóelsdóttir | MA, 1985 | Artist | |
| Marianne Majerus | MA, 1983 | Photographer | |
| Nick Miller | BA, 1984 | Artist | |
| Philip Mould | BA, 1981 | Art historian | |

=== Arts administrators ===
| Name | Class year | Notability | Reference(s) |
|---|---|---|---|
| Mary Allen | MA, 2002 | Chief executive of the Royal Opera House | |
| Andrew Bolton | BA, 1987; MA | Museum curator | |
| Alissandra Cummins | BA, 1981 | Director of the Barbados Museum & Historical Society | |
| Séan Doran | BA, 1983 | Chief executive of English National Opera | |
| Derek Gillman | LLM, 1996 | Director of the Barnes Foundation | |
| Jessica Harrison-Hall | PhD, 2025 | Museum curator | |
| Tessa Jackson | BA, 1977 | Director of the Institute of International Visual Art | |
| Penny Johnson | BA, 1978 | Director of the Government Art Collection | |
| Jack Lohman | BA, 1979 | Director of the Museum of London and the Royal British Columbia Museum | |
| Mordechai Omer | PhD, 1976 | Director of the Tel Aviv Museum of Art | |
| Anna Southall | BA, 1970 | Director of the National Museums and Galleries of Wales | |
| Boris Wastiau | MA, 1993; PhD, 1997 | Director of the Musée d'ethnographie de Genève | |

=== Music ===
| Name | Class year | Notability | Reference(s) |
|---|---|---|---|
| Monty Adkins | PhD, 1997 | Composer | |
| Terry Burrows | BA | Musician and author | |
| Nicolas Collins | PhD, 2007 | Composer | |
| Jo Dipple | BA | CEO of UK Music and former special adviser to Gordon Brown | |
| Terry Edwards | BA, 1982 | Musician | |
| William Goodchild | BA, 1985 | Composer | |
| Aziz Harun | BSc, 2021 | Bruneian Singer | |
| Shabs Jobanputra | BA, 1990 | Music executive | |
| Kishon Khan | BSc, 1991 | Musician | |
| Gareth Malone | BA, 1997 | Emmy Award–winning choirmaster | |
| Eduardo Marturet | BA, 1974 | Conductor | |
| Dario Palermo | PhD, 2014 | Composer | |
| Elizabeth Parker | BA, 1973 | Composer | |
| Geoffrey Poole | BA, 1970 | Composer | |
| Jana Rowland | MA, 2001 | Composer and educator | |
| Julian Siegel | BA, 1986 | Musician | |
| Andrew Skeet | BA, 1993 | Composer | |
| Matt Tong | BA, 2000 | Musician | |

== Media ==
=== Newsreaders and correspondents ===
| Name | Class year | Notability | Reference(s) |
|---|---|---|---|
| David Grossman | BA, 1987 | Newsnight correspondent | |
| Razia Iqbal | BA, 1985 | BBC News correspondent | |
| Maupe Ogun | MA | Nigerian journalist | |
| Stuart Ramsay | BA, 1985 | Sky News Chief Correspondent and Emmy Award–winning journalist | |
| Selina Scott | BA, 1972 | Newsreader | |
| Mark Stone | BA, 2001 | Sky News US Correspondent and Emmy Award–winning journalist | |
| Geraint Vincent | BA, 1994 | ITV News Middle East Correspondent | |

=== Radio ===
| Name | Class year | Notability | Reference(s) |
|---|---|---|---|
| Iain Dale | BA, 1985 | Political commentator and radio presenter | |
| Greg James | BA, 2007 | BBC Radio 1 presenter | |
| Zeb Soanes | BA, 1997 | Radio 4 newsreader | |

=== Media executives ===
| Name | Class year | Notability | Reference(s) |
|---|---|---|---|
| Dame Jenny Abramsky | BA, 1968 | Director of BBC Radio | |
| James Boyle | MA, 1971 | Controller of BBC Radio 4 | |
| Jonathan Powell | BA, 1969 | Controller of BBC One | |
| Peter Rippon | BA, 1988 | Editor of Newsnight | |
| Sally-Ann Wilson | BA, 1980; MPhil | Secretary-General of the Commonwealth Broadcasting Association | |

=== Other media personalities ===
| Name | Class year | Notability | Reference(s) |
|---|---|---|---|
| Benedict Allen | BSc, 1981 | Explorer | |
| Darren Bett | BSc, 1989 | BBC weather forecaster | |
| Steve Blame | MA, 2006 | Broadcaster | |
| Jim Chapman | BSc | YouTube vlogger | |
| Joanna Coles | BA | Editor-in-chief of Cosmopolitan and Marie Claire | |
| John Fraser | MA, 1970 | Journalist | |
| Rebecca Lowe | BA, 2002 | Sports reporter | |
| Christina Patterson | MA, 1987 | Journalist | |
| Mark Seddon | BA, 1984 | Journalist | |
| Emily Sheffield | BA | Editor of the Evening Standard | |
| Jake Wallis Simons | PhD, 2009 | Editor of The Jewish Chronicle | |
| Penny Tranter | BSc, 1982 | BBC weather forecaster | |
| Martin Tyler | BA, 1967 | Football commentator | |

== Activism and charity ==
| Name | Class year | Notability | Reference(s) |
|---|---|---|---|
| Patrick J. Bergin | PhD, 1996 | CEO of the African Wildlife Foundation | |
| Howard Clark | BA, 1971 | Chair of War Resisters' International | |
| David Harker | BA, 1972 | Chief executive of Citizens Advice | |
| Jad Isaac | PhD, 1979 | Director General of the Applied Research Institute–Jerusalem | |
| Gary Lefley | BA, 1976 | General Secretary of the Campaign for Nuclear Disarmament | |
| Marina Mahathir | MA, 2019 | President of the Malaysian AIDS Council | |
| Richard Sandbrook | BSc, 1968 | Director of the International Institute for Environment and Development | |

== Business ==
| Name | Class year | Notability | Reference(s) |
|---|---|---|---|
| Alison Brimelow | BA, 1970 | President of the European Patent Office | |
| Jack Clark | BA, 2009 | Co-founder of Anthropic | |
| Eduardo Costantini | MA, 1975 | Argentine billionaire and founder of the Latin American Art Museum of Buenos Aires (MALBA) | |
| Neil Doncaster | MBA, 2008 | CEO of the Scottish Premier League | |
| Ahmad Fuaad | BSc, 1993 | CEO of UMW Holdings, Proton and Malakoff | |
| Joe Greenwell | BA, 1973 | CEO of Jaguar Land Rover | |
| Tamara Ingram | BA, 1982 | CEO of Saatchi & Saatchi and J. Walter Thompson | |
| Dame Karen Jones | BA, 1978 | Co-founder of Café Rouge | |
| Billy Kan | BSc | Hong Kong billionaire | |
| Marcus Leaver | BA, 1992 | Publishing executive | |
| Tshediso Matona | MSc, 1996 | CEO of Eskom | |
| Mike Norris | BSc, 1983 | CEO of Computacenter | |
| Brendan O'Neill | PhD, 1973 | CEO of ICI and Diageo | |
| Thari Pheko | BSc, 1983 | CEO of Botswana Communications Regulatory Authority | |
| Robert Schofield | BA, 1973 | CEO of Premier Foods | |
| Alexander Smith | BSc, 1973 | CEO of Pier 1 Imports | |
| David Tabizel | BA, 1986 | Co-founder of Autonomy | |

== Economists ==
| Name | Class year | Notability | Reference(s) |
|---|---|---|---|
| Carlos Nuno Castel-Branco | MA, 1992 | Mozambican economist | |
| Mario Luis Fuentes | PhD, 1982 | Director General of the Mexican Social Security Institute | |
| Engilbert Guðmundsson | MSc, 1979 | Director General of the Icelandic International Development Agency | |
| Swinburne Lestrade | MSc, 1975 | Director General of the Organisation of Eastern Caribbean States | |
| David Nuyoma | BA; MA | Chairman of the Namibian Stock Exchange and CEO of the Development Bank of Namibia | |
| Güven Sak | MA, 1984 | Founding member of the Monetary Policy Committee of the Central Bank of Turkey | |

== Law ==
| Name | Class year | Notability | Reference(s) |
|---|---|---|---|
| Michael Bloch | MPhil | Barrister | |
| Elena Efrem | LLB, 1989 | Justice of the Supreme Court of Cyprus | |
| Andrew Gordon-Saker | LLB, 1980 | Senior Costs Judge | |
| Michael Lodge | LLB | Secretary-General of the International Seabed Authority | |
| Anna Marcoulli | LLB, 1995 | Judge of the General Court (European Union) | |
| Derek Pang | LLB, 1985 | Justice of Appeal of the High Court of Hong Kong | |
| Ashby Pate | LLM, 2009 | Associate Justice of the Supreme Court of Palau | |
| Laura Pillay | LLB, 2001 | Judge of the Supreme Court of Seychelles | |
| Hassan Al-Sayed | PhD, 2003 | Judge of the Qatar International Court | |
| Sanford Steelman | EAS, 1972 | Judge of the North Carolina Court of Appeal | |
| Robert Warnock | BA, 1974 | Senior Judge of the Sovereign Base Areas | |
| Ian Wingfield | BA, 1970 | Solicitor General of Hong Kong | |
| David Wood | BA, 1970 | President of the Council of Circuit Judges | |
| Dora Zatte | LLB, 1997 | Ombudsman of Seychelles | |

== Armed forces ==
| Name | Class year | Notability | Reference(s) |
|---|---|---|---|
| Steven Abbott | BA, 1977 | Commandant General of the RAF Regiment | |
| Atiqullah Baryalai | MA, 2012 | Afghan Deputy Defense Minister | |
| Sir Anthony Dymock | BA, 1970 | UK Military Representative to NATO | |
| Neil Morisetti | BSc, 1979 | Commander United Kingdom Maritime Forces | |

== Policing and intelligence services ==
| Name | Class year | Notability | Reference(s) |
|---|---|---|---|
| David Bolt | BA, 1976 | Independent Chief Inspector of Borders and Immigration | |
| Matthew Dunn | BA, 1996 | MI6 field agent turned author | |
| Sir Peter Fahy | MA, 1998 | Chief Constable of Greater Manchester Police | |
| Michael Shipster | MA, 1977 | Diplomat and MI6 officer | |
| Sarah Taylor | BA, 2000 | Norfolk Police and Crime Commissioner | |

== Religion ==
| Name | Class year | Notability | Reference(s) |
|---|---|---|---|
| Ed Condry | BA, 1974 | Bishop of Ramsbury | |
| Audrey Elkington | PhD, 1983 | Archdeacon of Bodmin | |
| Olivia Graham | BA, 1984 | Bishop of Reading | |
| Arthur Hawes | BA, 1986 | Archdeacon of Lincoln | |
| Garth Norman | MEd, 1982 | Archdeacon of Bromley & Bexley | |
| Stephen Waine | BA, 1980 | Dean of Chichester | |

== Sport ==
| Name | Class year | Notability | Reference(s) |
|---|---|---|---|
| Eworitse Ezra Arenyeka | MSc, 2018; PhD | Boxer | |
| Wayne Barnes | LLB, 2000 | Rugby union referee | |
| Jessica Draskau-Petersson | LLB, 2000 | Olympic runner | |
| Rebecca Field | BA, 2010 | Bowls player | |
| Natasha Howard | BSc, 2002 | Olympic rower | |
| Andy Ripley | BA, 1969 | England rugby player | |
| James Vowles | BSc, 2000 | Team principal of Williams Racing | |
| Phil Whelan | BSc, 1993 | Premier League footballer | |
