= UEA School of International Development =

Coordinates: 52°37′18″N 1°14′30″E

The School of Global Development (formerly School of International Development and The School of Development Studies) is a department at the University of East Anglia, Norwich, England. Situated within the Faculty of Social Sciences, the School of International Development has been ranked in the top three British development studies departments.

== Research centre of excellence ==
The School of International Development (DEV) was founded in 1973 and along with the Overseas Development Group (ODG) has built a reputation as a centre of excellence for research, teaching and consultancy in international development, within the UK. The School has been ranked first for overall research quality, impact, environment and outputs in development studies (Times Higher REF Analysis 2021). 91% of research was judged as ‘world-leading’ or ‘internationally excellent’.

DEV research addresses contemporary challenges in developing and transition economies via methodological and theoretical innovation, interdisciplinary collaboration and a commitment that our research should make a difference. We work closely with individuals and communities often taking a long-term approach. Within DEV, faculty members work as researchers, consultants and advisers on a wide range of development projects, and their experience feeds back into research and teaching.

DEV undertakes problem-centred research with involvement of end-users to facilitate change, which is guided by the framework of research areas and themes. DEV has a research reputation in the fields of global environmental justice, water security, sustainable development, education and development, development evaluation, media and development, migrants and refugees and other leasing issues in development studies.

DEV publications are located in leading journals, such as Journal of Development Studies, Science, World Development, Journal of South Asian Development, African Affairs, Journal of Human Development and Economic Journal, as well as in books, research reports and working papers. DEV policy impacts are found within key development institutions, such as the Asian Development Bank (ADB), Department for International Development (DFID), Food and Agriculture Organisation (FAO), United Nations Educational, Scientific and Cultural Organisation (UNESCO), United States Agency for International Development (USAID, World Bank, World Health Organization (WHO) and World Wildlife Fund (WWF). DEV has a strong presence in national and international agendas through membership of ESRC panels, DFID committees and key UN policy forums; journal editorial positions, such as co-editor of Global Environment Change and book reviews editor of Journal of South Asian Development; high-level appointments, such as the former President of the Development Studies Association (DSA), Scientific Adviser on two major DEFRA projects on climate impacts and adaptation in China and India, and Vice-Chair of the Scientific and Technical Advisory Panel to the Global Environment Facility; and by attending, presenting at and organising seminars, workshops and conferences. Many faculty are members of the DSA, as well as other professional bodies, such as the International Society for Agricultural Economics.

== Overseas Development Group ==
ODG was founded in 1967 and it has made a significant contribution to international development though consultancy activities and training programmes within and outside the UK. ODG is the institutional mechanism for producing funded research and for policy engagement. All members of DEV faculty belong to ODG and they can generate research and applied work, which is sectoral, cross-themed or through partnerships with other organisations. ODG has 8 research staff working on a variety of projects, including adaptation to climate change in transboundary river basins in Africa; vulnerability and adaptation to natural hazards/disasters and climate change; and conservation, development and livelihoods, with an emphasis on Marine Protected Areas, small islands and climate change.

ODG also houses the UK Secretariat Office of the Sustainable Agriculture Innovation Network (SAIN) and the Social Action Research Centre (SARC). SAIN addresses the link between agriculture and climate change in a China-UK partnership on sustainable agriculture and fisheries. SARC is a research, training, consultancy, service and professional development agency. It runs the CBA/DFID Broadcast Media Scheme through a Programme Development Fund and a Travel Bursary Fund to improve and increase coverage of international development on UK mainstream TV.

== Notable alumni ==
=== Politics & Government ===
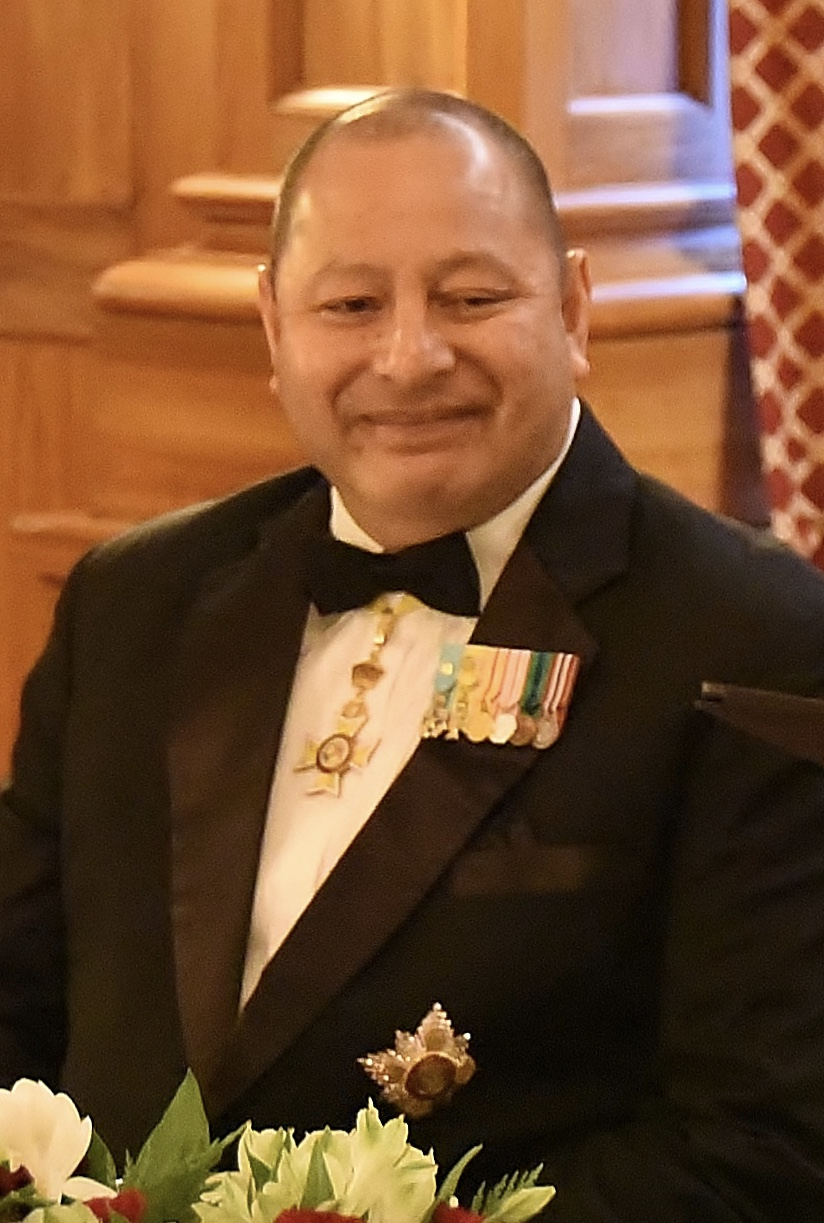
King of Tonga and former Prime Minister Tupou VI

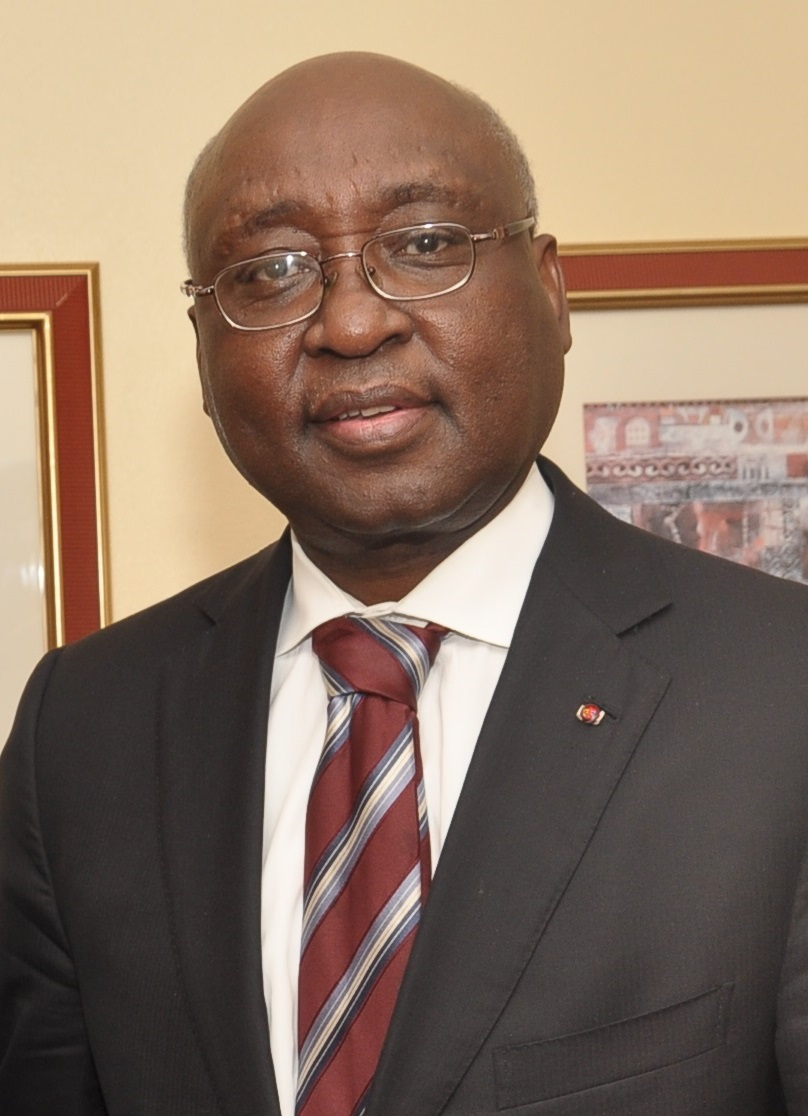
President of the African Development Bank and Rwandan Finance Minister Donald Kaberuka

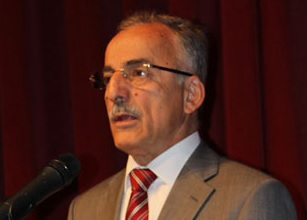
Turkish Deputy Prime Minister and Foreign Minister Murat Karayalçın

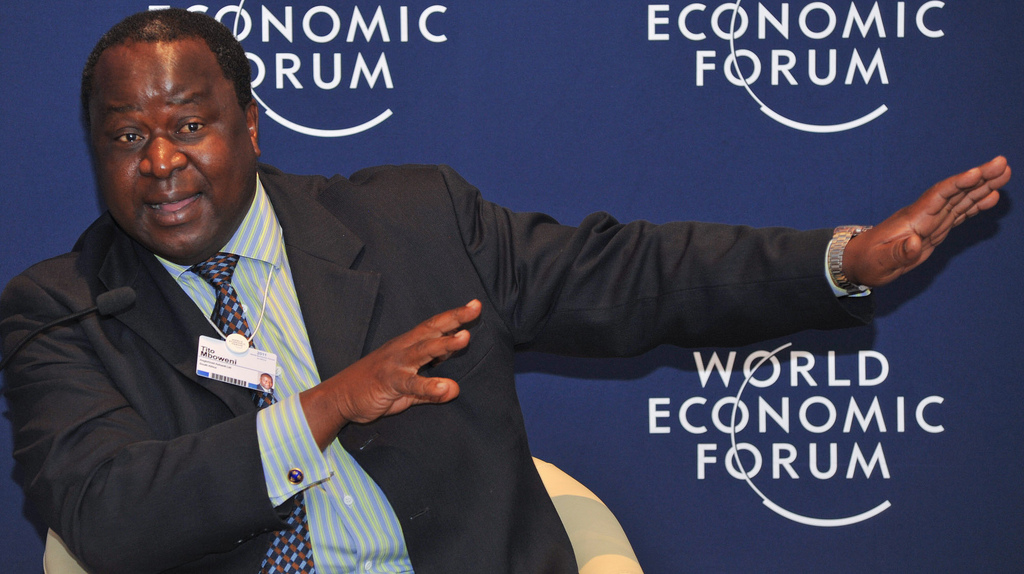
South African Finance Minister Tito Mboweni

- Tupou VI, King of Tonga and former Prime Minister of Tonga
- José Abel, East Timorese Secretary of State
- Yahya Al-Mutawakel, Yemeni Trade Ministert
- Samuel Koku Anyidoho, Ghanaian Politician
- Manuel de Araújo, Member of the Mozambican Assembly
- Anil Baijal, Lieutenant Governor of Delhi
- Atiqullah Baryalai, Afghan Deputy Defense Minister
- Aimé Boji, Democratic Republic of the Congo Budget Minister
- Julio Boltvinik, Member of the Mexican Chamber of Deputies
- Tony Colman, Labour Member of Parliament
- Gino Costa, Peruvian Interior Minister
- Cüneyd Düzyol, Turkish Cabinet Minister
- Óscar González, member of the Mexican Chamber of Deputies
- Hala Hameed, Maldivian Minister of State
- Ousman Jammeh, Gambian Foreign Minister
- Asha Abdullah Juma, Member of the Tanzanian National Assembly
- Donald Kaberuka, Rwandan Finance Minister and President of the African Development Bank
- Murat Karayalçın, Turkish Deputy Prime Minister and Foreign Minister
- Manuel Lajo, Member of the Peruvian Congress
- Agnes Kwaje Lasuba, South Sudanese Cabinet Minister
- Martin Manurung, Member of the Indonesian People's Representative Council
- Dee Margetts, Senator for Western Australia
- Brian Mathew, Liberal Democrat Member of Parliament
- Tito Mboweni, South African Cabinet Minister and Governor of the South African Reserve Bank
- Juma Ngasongwa, Tanzanian Trade Minister
- Suyoi Osman, Bruneian Education and Health Minister
- Murad Qureshi, Member of the London Assembly
- Peter Sinon, Seychellois Cabinet Minister
- Stone Sizani, Member of the South African National Assembly

=== Diplomatic Service ===
- Aníbal de Castro, Dominican Republic Ambassador to the United States
- Shofry Ghafor, Permanent Representative of Brunei to the United Nations
- Arjun Karki, Nepali Ambassador to the United States
- Ingebjørg Støfring, Norwegian Ambassador to Bangladesh and Zimbabwe

=== Other ===
- Patrick J. Bergin, CEO of the African Wildlife Foundation
- Carlos Nuno Castel-Branco, Mozambican economist
- Rick Caulfield, Chancellor of the University of Alaska Southeast
- Gurinder Chadha, film director
- Matthew Dunn, MI6 field agent turned author
- Mario Luis Fuentes, Director General of the Mexican Social Security Institute
- Olivia Graham, Bishop of Reading
- Rosebud Kurwijila, African Union Commissioner
- Swinburne Lestrade, Director General of the Organisation of Eastern Caribbean States
- Alie Badara Mansaray, Commissioner of the Sierra Leone National Commission for Social Action
- Tshediso Matona, CEO of Eskom
- Sayed Askar Mousavi, writer and novelist
- David Nuyoma, Chairman of the Namibian Stock Exchange and CEO of the Development Bank of Namibia
- Maupe Ogun, Nigerian journalist
- Mark Seddon, journalist, speechwriter for United Nations Secretary-General Ban Ki-moon
- Michael Shipster, MI6 officer
- Primitivo Viray, President of Ateneo de Naga University
- Paul Whitehouse, actor, writer, presenter and comedian
- Alan Whiteside, UN Commissioner for HIV/AIDS and Governance in Africa
- Sally-Ann Wilson, Secretary-General of the Commonwealth Broadcasting Association

== Notable faculty ==
- Piers Blaikie, geographer
- Katrina Brown, women's collective action
- John Harriss, international studies
- Ian Livingstone, development economist
- Ruth Mace, anthropologist
