= UEA Law School =

Law school within the University of East Anglia

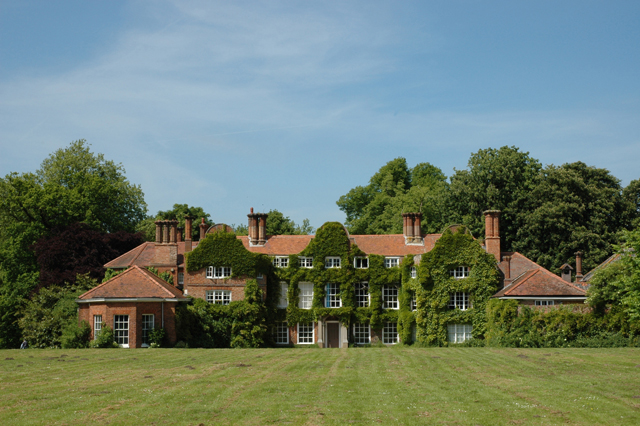
Earlham Hall, home to UEA Law School

UEA Law School, founded in 1977, is a school within the University of East Anglia, dedicated to research and teaching in law. It is located in Earlham Hall, a seventeenth-century mansion situated on the edge of the UEA campus. From mid-2010 to early 2014, the school was temporarily located in the Blackdale School Building owing to essential renovation work. In national league tables UEA Law School has most recently been ranked 38th in the UK by The Guardian.

== Research ==
The 2008 Research Assessment Exercise rated 80% of the research as being at international level (2* and above), of which 40% was rated as being of either world-leading (4*) or internationally excellent quality (3*).

The School has research centres or groupings in the areas of Competition Law, Media and Internet Law and International Company and Commercial Law.

Additionally, members of the School have international reputations for research in Medical Law, Intellectual Property Law, Public Order law, Evidence, Criminal Justice and Procedure, Comparative Private Law, Contract, Tort and Restitution, and Family law. In addition to these School-based research clusters, many researchers in the School belong to formal networks which go beyond the Law School. For example, the School's competition lawyers are members of the ESRC Centre for Competition Policy [CCP] and Morten Hviid of the Law School took over from Catherine Waddams as Director of the CCP in September 2010.

== Notable alumni ==
=== Law ===
- Elena Efrem, Justice of the Supreme Court of Cyprus
- Michael Lodge, Secretary-General of the International Seabed Authority
- Anna Marcoulli, Judge of the General Court (European Union)
- Derek Pang, Justice of Appeal of the High Court of Hong Kong
- Ashby Pate, Associate Justice of the Supreme Court of Palau
- Laura Pillay, Judge of the Supreme Court of Seychelles
- Hassan Al-Sayed, Judge of the Qatar International Court
- Andrew Gordon-Saker, Senior Costs Judge
- Dora Zatte, Ombudsman of the Seychelles

=== Politics ===
- Mathias Cormann, Secretary-General of the OECD
- Tariq bin Saeed bin Hilail Al-Shammari, Member of the Consultative Assembly of Saudi Arabia
- Ivor Stanbrook, Conservative Member of Parliament
- David Thomas, Labour Member of the European Parliament
- Adam Tomkins, Conservative Member of the Scottish Parliament

=== Other ===
- Wayne Barnes, rugby union referee
- Jessica Draskau-Petersson, Olympic runner
- Derek Gillman, Director of the Barnes Foundation
- Carl Lygo, Vice-Chancellor of Arden University
- Amir Muhammad, film director

== Notable faculty ==
- Dame Beverley Lang, High Court judge
- Sir Clive Lewis, High Court judge
