= School of Art History and World Art Studies (UEA) =

UK academic department

The School of Art History and World Art Studies operates with the Faculty of Arts and Humanities department at the University of East Anglia in Norwich, England.

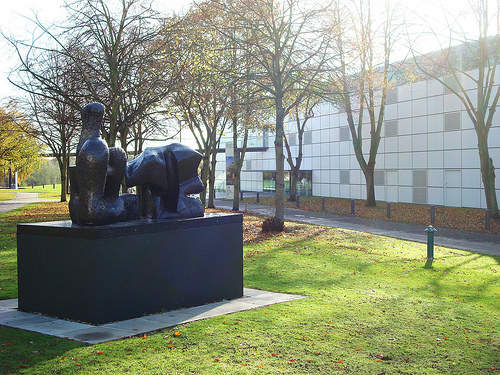
The school seen from outside

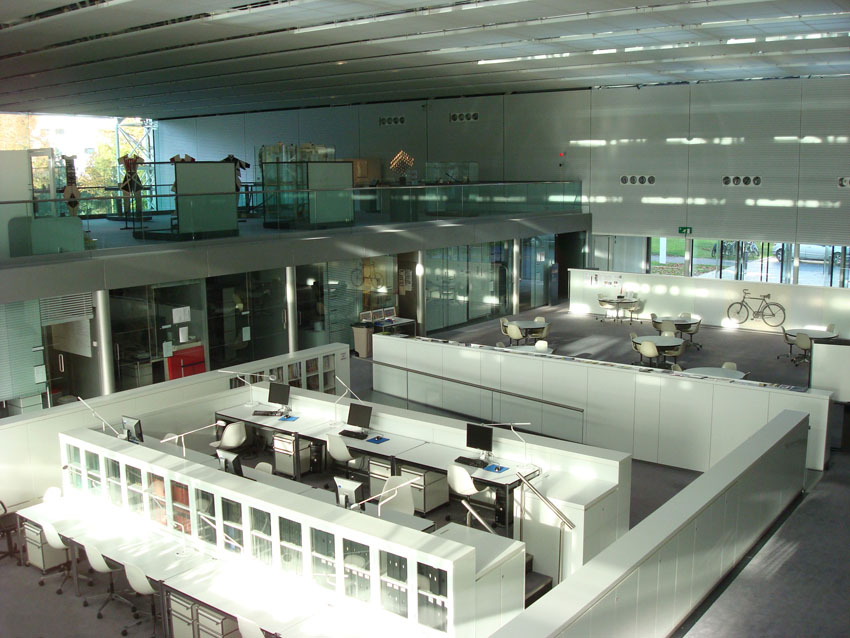
The school in the Sainsbury Centre for Visual Arts, designed by Foster & Partners

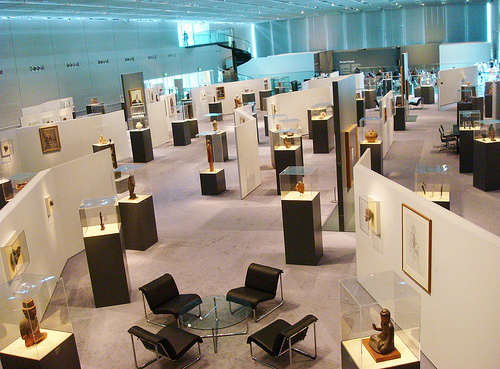
The main gallery of the Sainsbury Centre for Visual Arts

== History ==
This institution was founded in 1964 as the School of Fine Arts and Music, providing art history and music courses. It was later renamed the School of Art History and Music, and then changed to the School of World Art Studies and Musicology in 1992 to reflect a more cross-disciplinary approach to the study of art. The School took on its present name in 2013 and currently provides students with instruction and research opportunities in archaeology, anthropology, architecture, and museum studies in addition to art history. Courses offered include medieval and Renaissance European art, contemporary art, ancient art, and African art. The School applies a global perspective to all coursework.

A 1978 gift of world art from the Sir Robert and Lady Lisa Sainsbury Collection enabled the School to relocate to purpose-built facilities in Norwich at the Sainsbury Centre for Visual Arts, designed by Sir Norman Foster.

== Rankings ==
The School is ranked first for research (History of Art, Architecture, and Design) in the 2008 Research Assessment Exercise of UK Universities and achieved the joint highest student satisfaction rating for an art history department, according to the 2009 National Student Survey. The School is one of the top three art history departments in the UK, according to The Times Good University Guide 2010.

== Notable alumni ==
- Paul Atterbury, Antiques expert.
- Tim Bentinck, 12th Earl of Portland, Actor and former Cross bench Peer.
- Andrew Bolton, Curator in Chief of the Anna Wintour Costume Center.
- Alissandra Cummins, Director of the Barbados Museum and Historical Society.
- Robin Devereux, 19th Viscount Hereford, Director of Valuations at Bonhams.
- Tessa Jackson, Director of INIVA.
- Penny Johnson, Director of the Government Art Collection.
- Avril Joy, Costa Book Award-winning Author.
- Marcus Leaver, Publishing executive.
- Jack Lohman, Director of the Royal British Columbia Museum.
- Philip Mould, Art historian.
- Vicki Pepperdine, Actress.
- Catherine Rabett, Actress.
- Mark Stone, Sky News Europe Correspondent and Emmy Award-winning Journalist.
- Hassan Wario, Kenyan Cabinet Minister.
- Boris Wastiau, Director of the Musée d'ethnographie de Genève.

== Notable faculty ==
- John Onians, Architectural Historian.
- Christina Riggs, Historian of Archaeology.
