= Kauna Malgwi =

Nigerian human rights advocate and clinical psychologist

Kauna Ibrahim Malgwi
- Born: 26 November; Borno State
- Citizenship: Nigerian
- Occupation: Clinical Psychologist
- Writing career
- Notable awards: 100 most influential people in Artificial intelligence

Kauna Ibrahim Malgwi is a clinical psychologist and leader of the Content Moderators Union Nigeria in Nigeria.

== Advocacy ==
After working for Sama as a content moderator and being exposed to traumatising content, Malgwi testified against Meta Platforms as part of the Sama v Meta Platforms lawsuit. Malgwi has since founded Digital Rights and Mental Health Initiative Africa (DRMHIA), a non-profit organisation that advocates for online privacy, digital addiction, and cyberbullying.

== Education ==
Malgwi is a PhD student in psychology at Pan Africa Christian University focusing on digital wellbeing and mental health. Master's in clinical psychology United States International University-Africa (USIU-A)
