= MRSM Tun Ghafar Baba =

Maktab Rendah Sains MARA Tun Ghafar Baba, commonly known as MRSM Tun Ghafar Baba (formerly known as MRSM Jasin) is a co-educational boarding school in Jasin District, Melaka, Malaysia.

== Background ==
The school was established in 1981. It is located in the district of Jasin, one of the three districts in the State of Melaka, with a total area of 50 hectares. It was launched by the Chief Minister of Malacca at that moment, YAB Dato' Seri Mohd Adib Mohamad Adam on 21 June 1981. The first phase development of the school followed includes the Academic Block, the Administration Block, the Hostel Block, the Lecture Hall, the Library and the Laboratories.

The first batch of school students came on 2 August 1982, consisting of 150 Form 1 students and 150 Form 2 students, with 16 teachers during that time. The opening of the school was officiated on 8 March 1984, by the Deputy Prime Minister, YAB Datuk Musa Hitam.

In 1995, MRSM Tun Ghafar Baba is one of the three MRSM that implemented Program Khas Pendidikan (Special Education Program) to train, enhance and enrich the brightest students in the country. This program enable the school to take only the students who have obtained straight As in their PMR examination and passed the MRSM's Entry Qualification Test (UKKM) with excellent results.

MRSM Tun Ghafar Baba made its landmark by achieving 100% passes with Grade 1 in 1997.

The other MRSM which undergo the same PKP's recognition are MRSM Taiping, and MRSM Pengkalan Chepa during that time. MRSM Tun Ghafar Baba has maintained its status quo as one of the top achievers nationwide in the Malaysian Certificate of Education (SPM) exam with excellent results. It is one of the top 5 MRSMs that outperformed during SPM examination and considered as one of the top 10 secondary schools in Malaysia.. In 2001, 2005, 2006, 2012 and 2016, MRSM Tun Ghafar Baba was listed as the best school for SPM level in Malaysia.

In conjunction to commemorate its 25th anniversary, MRSM Jasin was renamed as MRSM Tun Ghafar Baba on July 25, 2006 by the Minister of Entrepreneur & Cooperative Development, Dato Seri Mohamed Khaled Bin Nordin.
