= Ahmad Fuaad =

Malaysian businessman

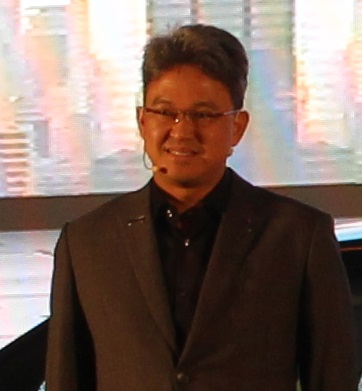
Ahmad Fuaad

Datuk Sri Ahmad Fuaad Bin Mohd Kenali (born 1970) is a Malaysian business executive. He is the former chief executive officer (CEO) of UMW Holdings. He was the CEO of Proton from 1 April 2016 to 30 September 2017. He held the same position at Malakoff between 2017 and 2020.

Fuaad is a member of the Malaysian Institute of Accountants and the Malaysian Institute of Certified Public Accountants, and attended the senior management development programme organised by the Harvard Business School Alumni Club of Malaysia. Fuaad attended MRSM Taiping and later continued his studies at the University of East Anglia, graduating with a Bachelor of Science degree in computerised accountancy. He also holds a BTEC national diploma in business and finance from Brighton College of Technology, UK.

He was appointed group CFO of DRB-HICOM in August 2013. Prior to that, he was group CFO at Astro Malaysia Holdings.

He began his career with Arthur Andersen & Co in 1994, leaving in 2001 to take up the position of executive director of finance at Petaling Garden. In 2008, he joined EY as executive director/partner of audit and business advisory services, and was with the firm until 2010 when he joined Astro Malaysia Holdings.
