= Margaret Muthwii =

Kenyan academic administrator (*1957)

Professor Margaret Muthwii

Vice-Chancellor of Pan Africa Christian University
- In office January 2014 – January 2024

Personal details
- Born: 13 October 1957 (age 68)
- Education: University of Nairobi; University of East Anglia

Margaret Jepkirui Muthwii (born 13 October 1957) is a Kenyan academic who was vice-chancellor of Pan Africa Christian University from January 2014 to January 2024. https://www.pacuniversity.ac.ke/brief-history/

She was educated at the University of Nairobi (BA, 1980) and the University of East Anglia (MA, 1986; PhD, 1994). She was previously a senior lecturer at Kenyatta University.

== Publications ==
- Language use in pluri-lingual socieites : the significance of code-switching, 1986
- Variability in language use : a study of Kalenjin speakers of English and Kiswahili in Kenya, 1994
- New language bearings in Africa : a fresh quest, 2003
