= Dario Palermo =

Italian composer (born 1970)

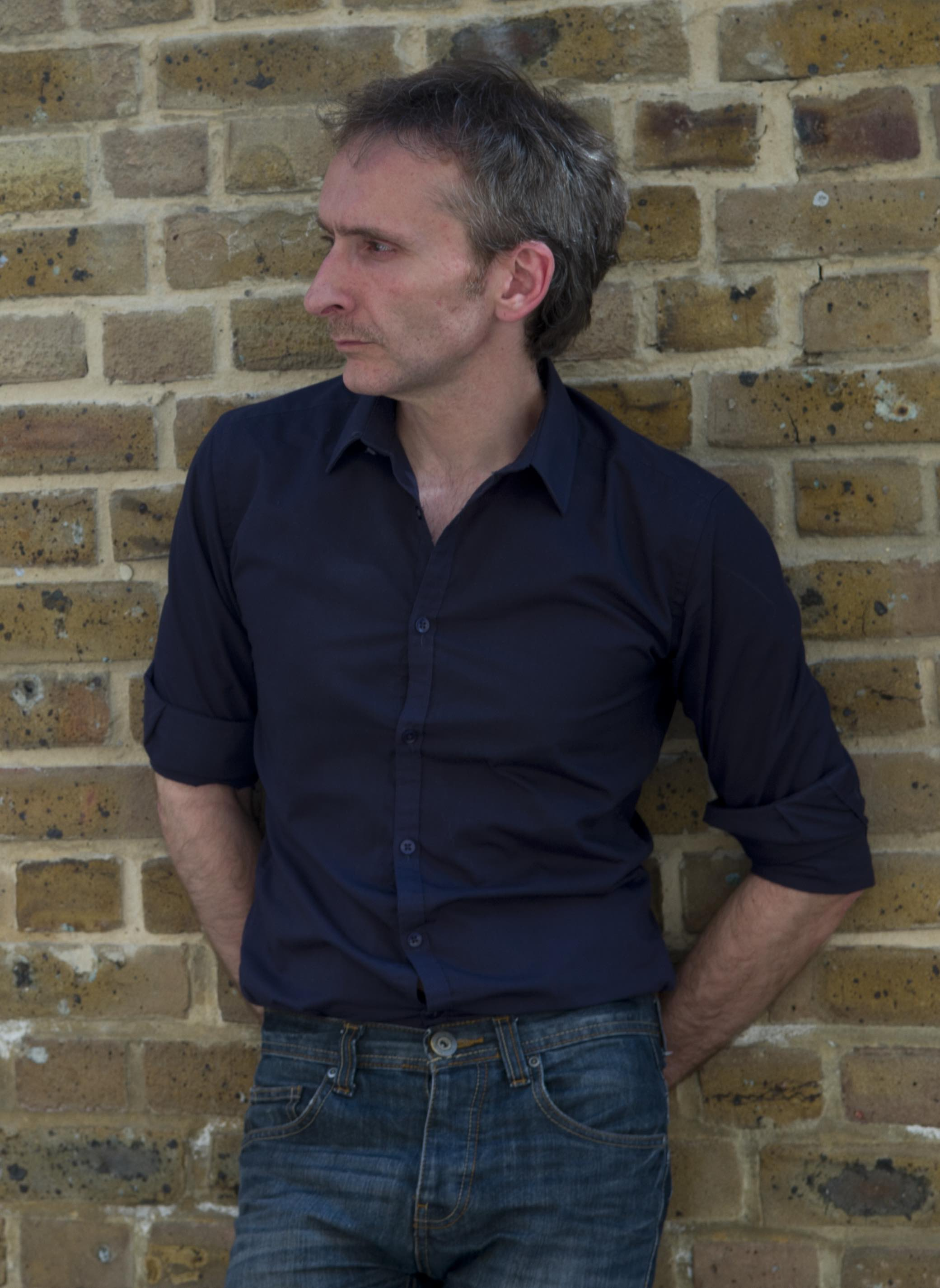
Dario Palermo, 2015

Dario Palermo (born 14 June 1970) is an Italian composer.

== Biography ==
Born in Milan, Dario Palermo began his musical studies in classic guitar at the age of nine, subsequently following studies in percussion with Italo Savoia (Teatro alla Scala of Milan, La Scala), and shortly after at the Civica Scuola di Musica di Milano with David Searcy and Jonathan Scully (Teatro alla Scala of Milan). In the early years of his career as performer, he played all over Europe in several ensembles, chamber groups and orchestras with, amongst others, Václav Neumann, Christa Ludwig, Thomas Allen, and Claudio Abbado.

During the same years at the Civica Scuola di Musica, Palermo enrolled in composition studies initially with Massimiliano Carraro, and then with Giorgio Taccani and Giovanni Verrando. Palermo attended also seminars and classes with Pierre Boulez, Franco Donatoni, Emmanuel Nunes, Aldo Clementi, and particularly with Gérard Grisey. In 2003, he was selected by the Reading Panel of IRCAM, Institut de Recherché et Coordination Acoustique/Musique of Paris, Composition and Music Computer Technologies. Since 2003 he lived between France and United Kingdom where he completed a PhD in composition and technologies at University of East Anglia under the supervision of Simon Waters. In 2011 he was awarded a Royal Philharmonic Society Drummond Fund for a new work.

Between 1993 and 1999 he collaborated with Agon, centre for research and production via the use of electronic and computer technologies, with Luca Francesconi as Artistic Director. In Agon, he was involved in the programming and realization of concerts, installations, music-theatre works, and festivals.

Dario Palermo has composed works for forces varying from solo instruments to orchestra, also involving the use of electroacoustic devices and new technologies. His compositions have been performed throughout Europe, Americas and Asia. He has received commissions from many organization, festival, ensembles and chamber groups. His most recent works have been premiered at Kings Place, London; Mediarte Festival, Monterrey; Sonorities festival, Belfast; Southbank Centre and Southbank Centre's Purcell Room, London; Centro Nacional de las Artes, Mexico City; Gare du Nord, Basel; Visiones Sonoras Festival, Morelia; Venice Biennale.

Since 1995, he has taught composition, theory and analysis, electro acoustic composition and new technologies; between 1999 and 2002, he joined the Centro Tempo Reale, Florence, Italy, to work and accomplish Luciano Berio’s project for Basic Musical Literacy for children via the use of New Technologies. He has been invited to lecture in special courses, advanced seminars, and master classes in several conservatoires and universities worldwide.

== Selected works ==
=== Instrumental ===
- Duo, for Horn and Marimba (2019)
- Etude nr.1, pour piano (2015)
- Quatre Miniatures, pour deux violons (2015)
- Trois Miniatures, pour guitare quartet (2014)
- RO – Première danse de la Lune, for drum-set percussion and real time electronics (2011/12)
- The Difference Engine, for string quartet, mezzo-soprano and real time electronics (2010/11)
- Trance – Five Abstract Stations, for male voice and real time electronics (2009)
- Ritual, version for viola, real time composition and live electronics (2007–2008)
- Ritual, for viola d'amore, real time composition & Live Electronics (2006–2007)
- Exodus...Lands, for horn, vibraphone, viola (2005–2006)
- Following The White Rabbit, for contrabass flute, two contrabass clarinets, contrabassoon and live electronics (2000)
- Move_On, for piccolo and live electronics (2000)
- Cilla_Pusut, for female vocal quartet, mezzo-soprano and electronics (2000)
- Latitudes I, for contrabass flute and live electronics (1998)
- Lied II, for bass clarinet (1995)
- Oltre La Tela – Beyond the Canvas, (1993)
- Danza, for cello solo (1993)

=== Ensemble – Orchestra – Opera ===
- II - für sechs Stimmen (2018)
- Khantor's lollipops & the conjecture of the Pompeiu problem, a miniature opera (2017)
- sur l’excitation des corps, une miniature pour piano et ensemble (2016/17)
- Still Life v. IV, a film opera for mezzo-soprano, contralto, trumpet, film and real time electronics (2013/14)
- Still Life v. II, a film opera – responsive environment, for drum-set percussion, real time electronics audio and video (2013)
- music for The Difference Engine, for string quartet, mezzo-soprano, two dancers, real time electronics audio and video (2010/11)
- Latitudes Del Silencio, for ensemble (2004–2006)

=== Variable – Multimedia ===
- Still Life, a sound-video-scape live environment installation, live responsive environment (2012/13)
- Two Perspectives, for two performers and real-time electronic composition (2010)
- DISCOMBOBULATOR, (2009)
- Cyborg, for female voice, real time audio and video (2002)

== Discography ==
- Difference Engines, monographic CD – AMRN 040-04C – 2015 – Arditti String Quartet; Catherine Carter, soprano; Milo Tamez, drum-set percussion; Jean-Michel Van Schouwburg, tenor
