= Bo Fowler =

British novelist

Bo Fowler (born 1971) is a British novelist. Fowler is the author of Scepticism, Inc and The Astrological Diary of God.

== Biography ==
Bo was born in North London to artists Malcom Fowler & Nancy Fouts. Fowler received his degree studying philosophy at the University of Bristol. He went on to attend the University of East Anglia, where he studied for his PhD in Creative Writing under Malcolm Bradbury. In 1998 he was given £140,000 by Jonathan Cape for two books. He has since written The Philosophy of the Stars and Notes From the Autopsy of God. Fowler's influences include Friedrich Nietzsche, Kurt Vonnegut and Richard Brautigan.

== Bibliography ==
- Scepticism Inc. (1998)
- The Astrological Diary of God (1999)
- The Philosophy of Stars (2011)
- Notes From the Autopsy of God (2011)
