= Engilbert Guðmundsson =

Icelandic economist (born 1948)

Engilbert Guðmundsson (born 1948) was the Director General of the Icelandic International Development Agency (ICEIDA) from 2011 until its closure in 2015.

He was educated at Copenhagen Business School (BSc, 1974; MSc, 1976), the University of East Anglia (MSc Development Economics, 1979), and completed an Executive Development Program for Managers of the World Bank at the Harvard Business School.

He previously worked as Chief of the Democratic Institutions Section of the United Nations Integrated Peacebuilding Office in Sierra Leone, and was World Bank Country Manager for Sierra Leone from 2006 to 2010. He is also the former Vice President of the Nordic Development Fund.
