= Mansour bin Attia bin Mohammed Al-Mazrouei =

Member of the Consultative Assembly of Saudi Arabia
- Incumbent
- Assumed office 2021

Personal details
- Born: 30 April 1967 (age 59) Rabigh, Saudi Arabia
- Education: King Abdulaziz University; University of East Anglia

Mansour bin Attia bin Mohammed Al-Mazrouei (born 30 April 1967) has been a Member of the Consultative Assembly of Saudi Arabia since 2021.

He holds a bachelor's and master's degree in meteorology from King Abdulaziz University, and completed his PhD in climate change at the University of East Anglia in 2006.
