= Christopher Cullis =

Christopher Ashley Cullis has been Francis Hobart Herrick Professor of Biology at Case Western Reserve University since 1994.

He completed a BSc from the University of London (as an external student at University College of Rhodesia). He graduated from the University of East Anglia with an MSc in biophysics in 1968 and a PhD in genetics in 1971.

He has an h-index of 47 according to Google Scholar.
