= Sally-Ann Wilson =

Secretary-general of the Commonwealth Broadcasting Association

Sally-Ann Wilson (born 16 June 1959) has been secretary-general of the Commonwealth Broadcasting Association since 2010.

She graduated with a BA in development studies from the University of East Anglia in 1980 and an MPhil in cultural ecology. She joined the BBC in 1985. She is an associate tutor in the School of International Development at the University of East Anglia.
