= Julie Ann Amos =

English author

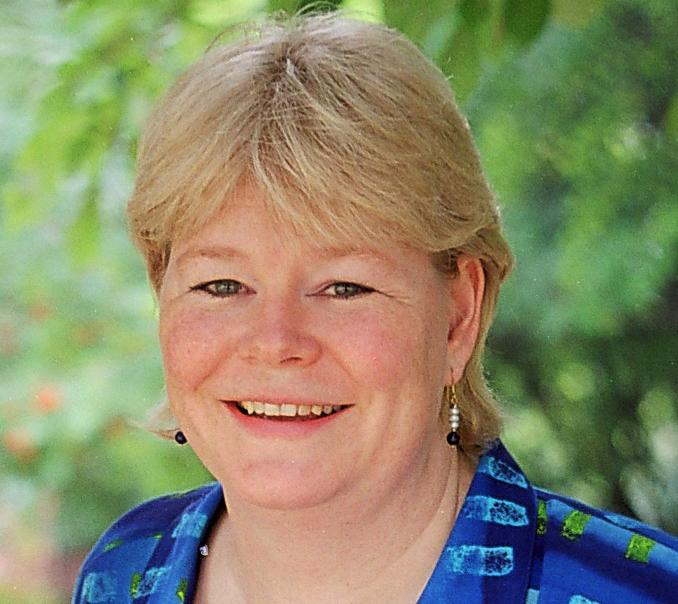

Personal details
- Education: University of East Anglia (BSc), University of Portsmouth (MA)
- Occupation: Writer, author, human resource management

Julie Ann Amos is a British management consultant, author and ghost writer. She has authored several non-fiction books on the topics of business management and the development of personal business skills.

== Education ==
Amos studied biological science and genetics at the University of East Anglia from 1980 to 1983 and received her BSc degree. She conducted post graduate study at the Institute of Administrative Management and in 1989 received a diploma in administrative management. In 1990 she enrolled at the University of Portsmouth and graduated with an MA degree in manpower studies and human resource management in 1992.

== Career ==
Amos worked in the retail, legal, military, government and investment banking industries as a human resources director before becoming a full-time writer, and management consultant. She began in 1990 with a position as the Senior Personnel and Training Officer at West Sussex County Council. In 1997 she took the job of Strategic Staff Development Consultant at Brent Council before becoming the Head of Resourcing at UBS. In 2000 she became the HR Director at NIB Capital Bank and in 2001 became the Recruitment Manager at BNP Paribas, and then a management consultant for Origin HR, The Admirable Crichton and SAV Credit.

She wrote her first four books in her spare time while she was employed as a human resource expert. Amos wrote two of her self-help, business books: Self-Management and Personal Effectiveness in the year 2000. Her first work, an introduction to management, later became a part of the United Kingdom's Institute of Management's standard text.

In 2004, she published the self-help book; How to Pass that Job Interview, which reportedly takes the reader "step-by-step though the recruitment process". In 2005 she founded Exquisite Writing company (Amos Consulting Ltd), in Whitecroft, Gloucestershire, a copywriting and ghostwriting service. It advertises itself as having created thousands of published articles and more than 100 books.

She wrote her book, The Secret World of Ghostwriters: And How to Work With One, in 2008, as an effort to demystify various aspects of the ghostwriting industry. In 2011 she became the managing director for Royston Records and publishing.

During her career, Amos has personally authored a dozen non-fiction books in her own name, that have been published in more than 20 countries, on the topics of management, business and personal development and her books have been translated into several languages. She is also a featured contributor and author for Yahoo and EzineArticles and HubPages.

== Books ==
Books by Amos include:

- How to Pass that Job Interview (July 2011)
- The Secret World of Ghostwriters: And How to Work With One (August 2008)
- Delivering a Meaningful Eulogy (September 2007)
- Handling Tough Job Interviews (June 2005)
- Delegating (April 2005)
- 80/20 Management (March 2005)
- Handling Tough Job Interviews: Be Prepared, Perform Well, Get the Job (June 2004)
- Be Prepared!: Getting Ready for Job Interviews (February 2004)
- You're in Charge Now! (How to) (December 2002)
- Making Meetings Work (Essentials) (November 2000)
- Job Hunt on the Net (October 2000)
- Moving into Management: Prepare Yourself to Be an Effective and Efficient Manager (Business and Management) (September 2000)
- Write a Winning CV: Essential CV Writing Skills That Will Get You the Job You Want (Essentials) (August 2000)
- Self-Management and Personal Effectiveness: How to Achieve Your Personal Goals in Life & at Work (How to Books (Midpoint)) (June 2000)
- Making the Most of Your Time: Work Smarter, Not Harder – Take Control of Your Life – Be a Super Achiever (Essentials Series) (December 1999)
- Managing Your Time: What to Do and How to Do It in Order to Do More (June 1998)
- Starting to Manage: How to Prepare Yourself for a More Responsible Role at Work (Business Basics) by (November 1996)
- Managing Yourself: How to Achieve Your Personal Goals in Life & at Work (How to Books Business Basics) (February 1996)
