= Jana Rowland =

English composer and educator

- Born: 1958 (age 67–68)
- Known for: Composer and educator

Jana Rowland (née Dugal) (born 1958) is an English composer and educator. She specialises in choral and vocal music, as well as electroacoustic soundtracks.

== Education ==
Rowland studied music from an early age, singing with Esther Saloman, and Richard Wood from the Royal Academy of Music London. She graduated with a master's degree in Music Composition by Research from the University of East Anglia in 2001. Her studies included a one hour choral and electro-acoustic piece called 'The Logic and The Miracle', performed at Norwich Cathedral in 2000.

== Career and works ==
In 2002, Rowland composed The Requiem, a mass for two choirs SATB. The Requiem was performed at St Mary's Church, Halesworth, Suffolk, for All Souls' Day November 2002 and 2003.

Other titles include Dream of Sarkis, The Voice Circus and Dialogue with the Sea. More recent compositions include The King’s River, a community opera first performed in 2017 by Woodbridge Riverside Trust, and later in 2019 by Woodbridge Choral Society and conducted by Andrew Leach.

Rowland runs Music Hub Cerdd along with her husband, Mike Rowland. The not-for-profit organisation offers sensory and music sessions to explore and improve wellbeing through the language of music and play. The Rowlands have also composed a number of pieces together, including the 2000 album Symphony of Light with Wenhaston Girls' Choir, of which Rowland was Musical Director from 1997-2008.
