= Christine Pountney =

Canadian author (born 1971)

Christine Pountney (born 1971) is a Canadian author. She has published three novels, and has written for The Guardian, the New York Times Magazine, the Walrus, Brick Magazine, and Nuvo.

Born in Vancouver, British Columbia, Pountney grew up in Montreal, Quebec. She graduated with an MA in creative writing from the University of East Anglia in 1997. She lives in Toronto with her ex, Michael Winter, and their son, Leo.

== Awards and recognition ==
- Last Chance Texaco was long-listed for the Orange Prize in 2000.

== Bibliography ==
- Last Chance Texaco (2000)
- The Best Way You Know How (2005)
- Sweet Jesus (2012)
