= Nick Dulvy =

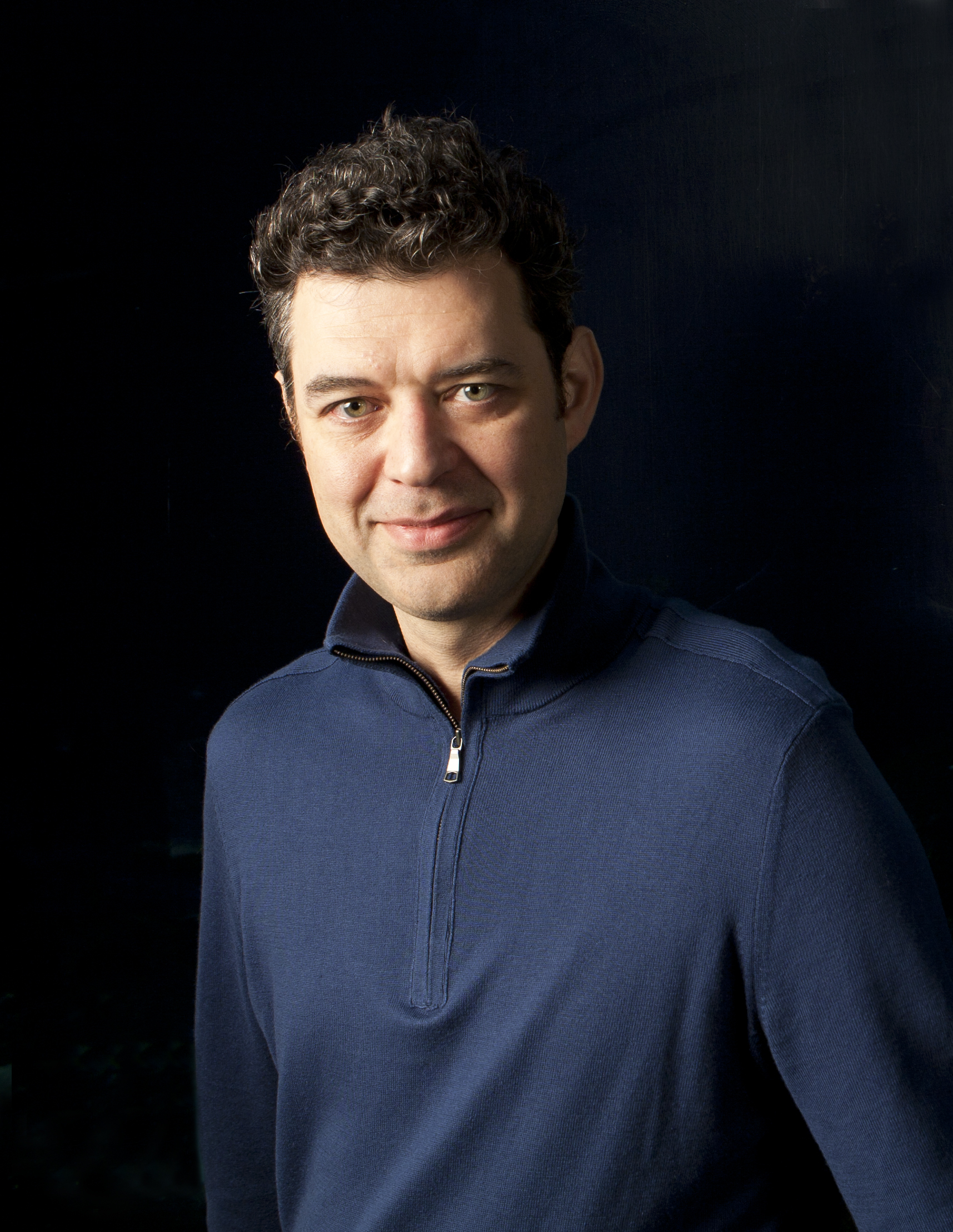
- Education: University of Birmingham; University of East Anglia (PhD)
- Scientific career
- Workplaces: Simon Fraser University
- Thesis: Life histories and conservation of sharks and rays (1998)

Nicholas Kevin Dulvy is a Distinguished Professor and Canada Research Chair in Marine Biodiversity and Conservation at Simon Fraser University. He was the Co-Chair of the International Union for Conservation of Nature (IUCN) Shark Specialist Group from 2009–2020. He has published more than 100 peer-reviewed papers and book chapters on life histories, extinction risk, the ecosystem impacts of fishing and the ecological and socioeconomic impacts of climate change.

Dulvy was educated at The Royal School, Armagh. He received his Bachelor of Science in Zoology from University of Birmingham in 1992, and his Doctor of Philosophy from the University of East Anglia in 1998. He spent several years working for the UK Government Fisheries Agency before taking a position at Simon Fraser University in 2008. His contributions to marine ecology include providing evidence for fisheries-induced trophic cascades at the island scale on coral reefs and the discovery that fishes are moving to deeper habitats in response to climate change. Dulvy and co-authors were the first to document marine population and species extinctions.

Dulvy's work is notable for its influence on biodiversity conservation, food security, and poverty alleviation. For this work he was the 2008 recipient of the Zoological Society of London's Marsh Award for Marine and Freshwater Conservation which is awarded for "contributions of fundamental science and its application to the conservation in marine and/or freshwater ecosystems". The award citation was for "research on the effects of climate change on fisheries and coastal communities, as well as threat and extinction risks in the context of improving fisheries management". In 2010, he was made a Conservation Fellow of the Zoological Society of London, an award honouring individuals who have made exceptional contributions to conservation.

In 2014 Dulvy was the primary author of the first global analysis of the vulnerability of chondrichthyans: "Extinction risk and conservation of the world's sharks and rays", a collaborative effort involving 302 experts from 64 countries. As the most endangered species of sharks and rays are sawfishes, Dulvy and co-authors then developed the first global sawfish conservation strategy.
