= Nicola Stonehouse =

British virologist

Nicola Stonehouse FRSB
- Born: Nicola Jane Stonehouse
- Education: University of East Anglia (BSc); University of Leeds (PhD)
- Scientific career
- Fields: Molecular virology
- Workplaces: University of Leeds
- Thesis: (1992)
- Website: biologicalsciences.leeds.ac.uk/molecular-and-cellular-biology/staff/141/professor-nicola-stonehouse

Nicola Jane Stonehouse FRSB is a British virologist who is a professor in molecular virology at the University of Leeds. Her research investigates viral diseases and the use of RNA aptamers to study viral proteins. She has worked on the development of a novel poliovirus vaccine that makes use of virus-like particles.

== Education ==
Stonehouse studied biology at the University of East Anglia, and graduated in 1983. She moved to the University of Leeds for her graduate studies, where she worked towards a doctorate in medicine, which she completed in 1992.

== Research and career ==
After her PhD, Stonehouse was awarded a Medical Research Council (MRC) clinical fellowship, where she was the first to describe the crystal structure of an RNA aptamer–protein complex.

Her research investigates the factors that can inhibit replication, with a focus on viral polymerases. She has developed several virus-like particles that may be able to act as vaccinations for emerging diseases. These virus-like particles (capsids) cannot cause disease themselves, but can be used to elicit an immune response. Amongst these studies, Stonehouse used this technology to work toward a safer polio vaccine. Her research was supported by the Bill & Melinda Gates Foundation, and made use of the virus-like particle strategy to trick the body into developing immunity against poliovirus. Stonehouse used an empty protein shell, designed to look and behave like poliovirus, which could trigger the immune system. A synthetic vaccine can be safer than a traditional vaccine as there is no risk of accidentally releasing the virus, and does not require a biocontainment laboratory. As part of the lifecycle of poliovirus it produces empty unstable particles. On their own, these unstable particles would undergo an antigenic conversion to a non-native state. To precisely mimic the shell of the poliovirus, Stonehouse and co-workers studied the structure at the Diamond Light Source. Using a combination of electron microscopy and crystal structures, the team identified ways to stabilise this virus-like particle shell. She engineered the virus-like particles using yeast as a recombinant system.

She has explored the viral genomes of various other viruses, including picornaviruses, noroviruses and coronaviruses. Noroviruses are a common cause of gastroenteritis, but there are no vaccines or specific antivirals. Stonehouse has investigated murine norovirus, the form of norovirus that affects mice, using cryogenic electron microscopy. Picornaviridae are a big family of positive-sense RNA viruses, and they contain several human and animal pathogens. In her investigations of foot-and-mouth disease, a sometimes fatal viral infection which is caused by a picornavirus, Stonehouse identified a small protein which is important in the viral replication. This small protein, 3B, is responsible for the efficient replication of foot-and-mouth disease, and demonstrates a significant level of genetic economy. In 2012 Stonehouse was award a research grant from the Biotechnology and Biological Sciences Research Council (BBSRC) to develop new generation vaccines to protect cattle, sheep, goats and pigs.

During the COVID-19 pandemic, Stonehouse provided regular commentary to the public on the status of coronavirus research. From the date of the first UK death coronavirus, Stonehouse emphasised that it was essential that the country improved its diagnostic capacity. She warned the public not to get too optimistic about a COVID-19 vaccine, as they can take "decades" to get to market. Stonehouse called for the Government of the United Kingdom to make it easier for universities and industrial labs to support testing efforts. She believes that an over-reliance on specific reagents made it difficult for testing centres to run at capacity. She has explained that the National Health Service procurement process makes it difficult to upscale any diagnostic efforts.

=== Selected publications ===
Her publications include:

- Crystal structure of an RNA bacteriophage coat protein–operator complex
- The three-dimensional structures of two complexes between recombinant MS2 capsids and RNA operator fragments reveal sequence-specific protein-RNA interactions
- A Simple, RNA-Mediated Allosteric Switch Controls the Pathway to Formation of a T=3 Viral Capsid

== Awards and honours ==
Stonehouse was elected a Fellow of the Royal Society of Biology (FRSB) in 2014.
