= Daphrose Gahakwa =

Rwandan politician

Rwandan Minister of Education
- In office March 2008 – July 2009
- Succeeded by: Charles Murigande

Personal details
- Born: Daphrose Gahakwa
- Education: Makerere University; University of East Anglia

Daphrose Mukankubito Gahakwa is a Rwandan politician who served as Minister of Education from 2008 to 2009.

== Biography ==
Gahakwa grew up in Uganda, and graduated from Makerere University with a Bachelor of Science in 1996. She went on to earn an MSc in plant breeding (1997) and PhD (2001) from the University of East Anglia in England. Her PhD was entitled "Molecular and Biochemical Studies of Transgene expression in Rice and Maize".

She was appointed Minister of Education following a cabinet reshuffle in March 2008, having previously been Minister of State for Agriculture. In July 2009, she was replaced as Minister of Education by Charles Murigande. She also served as Chancellor of the National University of Rwanda.

In October 2020, she was detained in prison to assist investigations into allegations of corruption and conflict of interest committed while she was still serving.

== Education background ==
- Daphrose Mukankubito Gahakwa holds a PhD from University of East Anglia in England
- She holds a bachelor's degree from Makerere university in Uganda
- Primary and secondly, she studied in Rwanda

== Career ==
- From 2008-2009 she was appointed as minister of education in Rwanda
- She became one of board of Rwanda Agriculture Board (RAB)
- She served as Chancellor of the National University of Rwanda

== Other ==
In October 2020, she was detained in prison to assist investigations into allegations of corruption and conflict of interest committed while she was still serving. Gahakwa is also accused of misusing public property when she diverted RAB’sirrigate her farm located in Gashora Sector, Bugesera District.

The prosecutors said that they have a report showing that the irrigation machine, which was at Gahakwa’s farm since 2013, was only returned to RAB in 2017.
