= Sarah Emily Miano =

American novelist

- Born: 1974 (age 51–52); Buffalo, New York, U.S.
- Occupation: Author

Sarah Emily Miano (born 1974) is an American author. She is a native of Buffalo, New York.

Aside from several short stories, Miano published her first novel - Encyclopaedia of Snow - in 2003. Influenced by post-modern authors such as Ezra Pound and T. S. Eliot, the book is structured as an encyclopaedia of snow-related topics, which are formed in an intricate way that interconnect and reflect upon each other which, in its intricacy, resembles a snowflake.

Miano is also the author of the book Van Rijn, a portrait of the painter Rembrandt.
