= Thari Pheko =

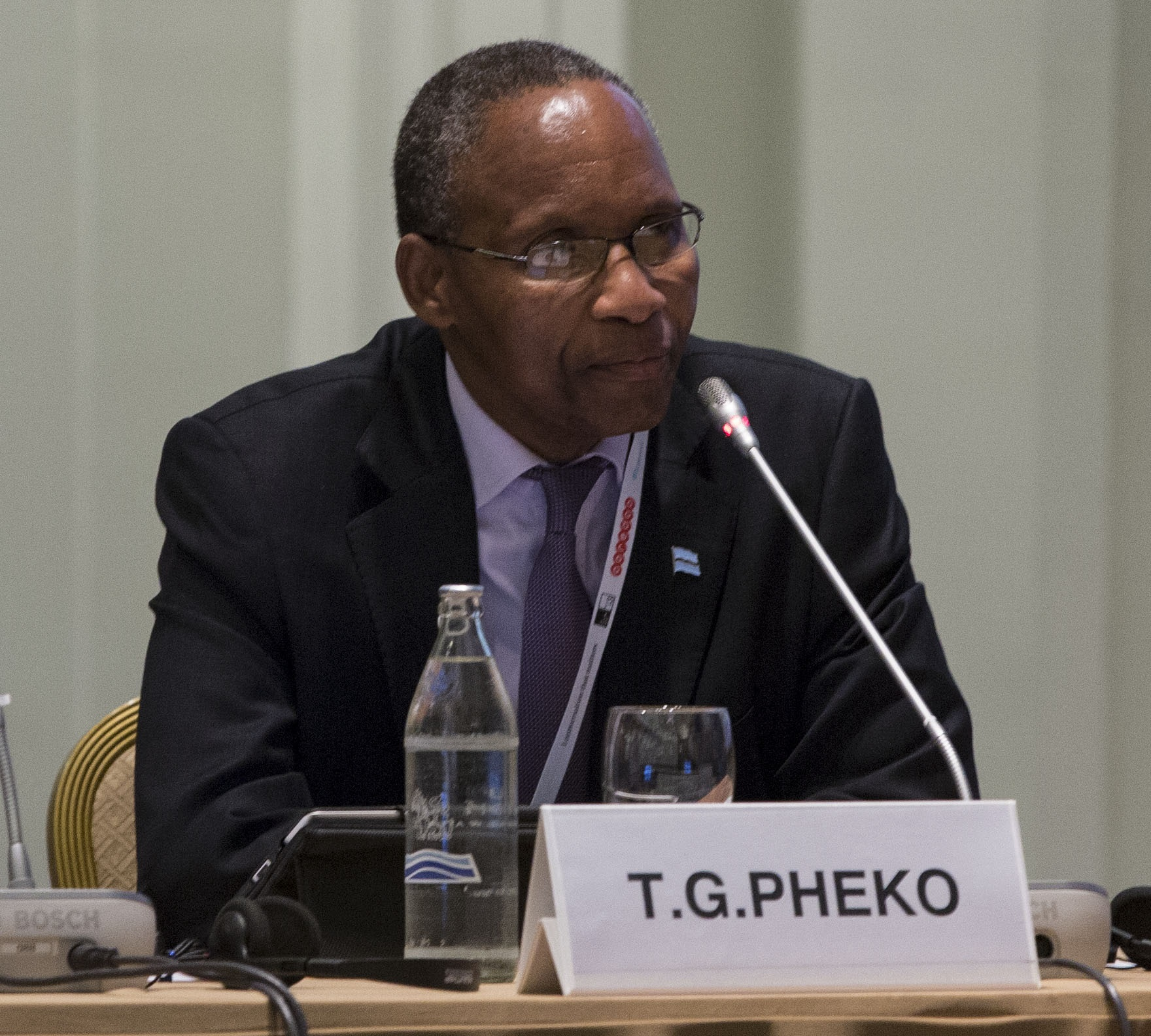
- Thari Pheko
- Occupation: CEO of Botswana Communications Regulatory Authority (BOCRA)

Thari Gilbert Pheko is the founding CEO of Botswana Communications Regulatory Authority.

He graduated from the University of East Anglia with a BSc in Business Finance and Economics in 1983 and an MSc in Management Information Systems in 1986. He was previously Chief Executive of the Botswana Telecommunications Authority for six years prior to its dissolution on 31 March 2013. He managed the transition from BTA to BOCRA. He was also President of Botswana Information Technology Society and a part-time lecture at the University of Botswana in Management and Information Systems.

Pheko retired in 2017.
