= Saeed Qasim Al-Khalidi Al-Maliki =

Saudi Arabian politician and academic

- سعيد بن قاسم بن يحيى الخالدي المالكي

Member of the Consultative Assembly of Saudi Arabia
- In office 3 December 2016 – 2020

Personal details
- Education: Imam Muhammad ibn Saud Islamic University; University of East Anglia

Saeed Bin Qasim Bin Yahya Al-Khalidi (Arabic: سعيد بن قاسم بن يحيى الخالدي المالكي) is a Saudi Arabian academic and politician. He was a Member of the Consultative Assembly of Saudi Arabia, and an associate Professor in the College of Business at King Khalid University.

A graduate of Imam Mohammad Ibn Saud Islamic University, he completed an MSc in Computer Science at the University of East Anglia in 2001, and subsequently completed a PhD in Information Systems at East Anglia in 2006.
