= Rebecca Barthelmie =

Wind energy scholar

Rebecca Jane Barthelmie is an atmospheric scientist and scholar of wind energy, including the effects of climate change on wind energy, estimation of the power production of wind farms, and the wakes created downwind from wind turbines. She has been called "the recognized expert on British offshore wind farms". Educated in England, she has worked in Denmark, Scotland, and the US, where she is a Croll Fellow and professor in the Sibley School of Mechanical and Aerospace Engineering at Cornell University.

== Education and career ==
Barthelmie has a Ph.D. from the University of East Anglia, where she was affiliated with the Climatic Research Unit from 1985 to 1992. After working for the Risø National Laboratory in Denmark (which later became incorporated into the Technical University of Denmark) she moved to the University of Edinburgh in Scotland as a professor of engineering in 2006.

She became a professor of atmospheric science and sustainability at Indiana University Bloomington in the US before moving in 2014 to her present position at Cornell University. She was Otto Mønsted Guest Professor at the Technical University of Denmark in 2015, and a Fulbright Scholar there in 2018; she continues to hold an honorary professorship at the university.

She is a former co-editor-in-chief of the journal Wind Energy.

== Recognition ==
Barthelmie was the 2009 recipient of the Academy Scientific Award of the European Wind Energy Academy.
