= Robert Schofield (businessman) =

British business executive (born 1952)

Robert John Schofield (born February 1952) is a British business executive.

He was educated at the University of East Anglia and went on to pursue postgraduate study at the International Institute for Management Development, Switzerland. He worked at Nestlé for eight years, and also served as Managing Director of United Biscuits, before becoming CEO of Premier Foods in January 2002.
