= Clive Randall =

American scientist

Clive A. Randall
- Education: University of East Anglia (BSc); University of Essex (PhD)
- Scientific career
- Workplaces: Pennsylvania State University
- Thesis: A transmission electron microscopy study of normal and relaxor perovskite ferroelectric materials (1987)

Clive A. Randall is a Distinguished Professor of Materials Science and Engineering and Director of Materials Research Institute at Pennsylvania State University. He is noted for his work on ceramics and functional materials.

He graduated with a BSc in Physics from the University of East Anglia in 1983 and a PhD in Experimental Physics from the University of Essex in 1987.

He received the Fulrath Award from the American Ceramic Society in 2002, and the Spriggs Phase Equilibria Award in 2008. He was elected a Fellow of the American Ceramic Society in 2005.

He has an h-index of 95 according to Google Scholar.
