= Eddie Mbadiwe =

Nigerian politician (born 1942)

Member of the House of Representative
- In office 2011–2015
- Constituency: Ideato North / South

Personal details
- Born: 6 February 1942 (age 84)
- Party: People's Democratic Party
- Education: University of Ibadan; University of East Anglia

Ifeanyichukwu Eddie Mbadiwe (born 6 February 1942) is a Nigerian politician who served as People's Democratic Party member of the House of Representatives for Ideato North/South in Imo State.

He was educated at Government Secondary School at Owerri, the University of Ibadan (BSc, 1966) and the University of East Anglia (PhD, 1975).

== Early life and education ==
Ifeanyichukwu Eddie Mbadiwe was born on 6 February 1942 in Enugu State, Nigeria. He attended Government Secondary School, Owerri, and later studied at the University of Ibadan, where he obtained a bachelor's degree in 1966. He earned a PhD from the University of East Anglia, United Kingdom, in 1975.

== Career ==
Mbadiwe worked as a biochemist and lecturer. He served at ICI Nigeria Limited and later joined the University of Nigeria, Nsukka, where he worked as a lecturer and senior lecturer. He also worked as a consultant and businessman.

He was elected as a member of the Imo State House of Assembly between 1979 and 1983. He later represented Ideato North/South Federal Constituency of Imo State in the House of Representatives from 2011 to 2015 under the People's Democratic Party (PDP).
