= Hilal Al Sarmi =

Politician

Member of the Consultative Assembly of Oman
- In office 2015–2023
- Constituency: Seeb

Personal details
- Born: 15 February 1978 (age 48)
- Education: University of East Anglia

Hilal bin Hamad bin Mohammed Al Sarmi (Arabic: هلال الصارمي, born 15 February 1978) is an Omani politician who was a Member of the Consultative Assembly of Oman for the wilayat of Seeb from the 2015 Omani general election until 2023. He was Chairman of the Health and Environmental Committee.

He graduated with a master's in international trade and diplomacy from the University of East Anglia.
