= Mariyam Azra =

Maldivian politician

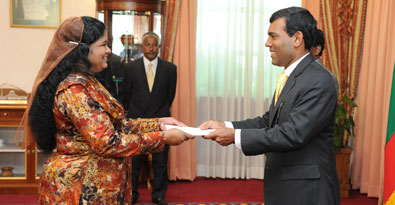
Azra receiving her appointment as President of the Human Rights Commission from President Mohamed Nasheed

Mariyam Azra Ahmed is a Maldivian politician and administrator. In December 2023, she was appointed Minister of State for Social and Family Development.

She was President of the Human Rights Commission of the Maldives from 2010 to 2015, and has held the posts of Minister of State for Law and Gender, and Minister of State for Education. She was chairwoman of the state media company, Public Service Media. She holds a master's degree from the University of East Anglia.
