= Martin Beniston =

Swiss climate scientist

Martin Beniston (born 1953) is a climate scientist who is currently an Honorary Professor at the University of Geneva.

Born in England, he holds a bachelor's degree in environmental sciences from the University of East Anglia and an MSc in atmospheric physics from the University of Reading. He undertook doctoral studies at Pierre and Marie Curie University on the numerical simulation of atmospheric processes at the Laboratoire de Météorologie Dynamique (LMD) of the Ecole Normale Supérieure in Paris, receiving his doctorate in June 1978. In 1997, he obtained his habilitation from ETH Zurich, focusing on climate modelling and the analysis of climate observations.

After working in various institutes in several countries, including the Laboratoire de Météorologie Dynamique in Paris, the Max-Planck-Institute for Meteorology in Hamburg and ETH-Zurich, in the 1990s he was appointed one of the vice-chairs of the IPCC (Intergovernmental Panel on Climate Change, recipient of the 2007 Nobel Peace Prize) and was also lead and contributing author for several chapters of the IPCC reports. He was appointed full professor (1996-2006) and head of the Institute of Geography at the University of Fribourg and subsequently at the University of Geneva (2006-2017) where he headed the Institute for Environmental Sciences. He is featured in Reuter's list of the "Top 1000 most influential climate scientists" in its ranking that first appeared in 2021.

His main research domains included regional climate modelling and the assessment of climate impacts, particularly in the Alpine region. Among his research accomplishments, he coordinated a major EU project from 2008-2014 (“ACQWA: Assessing climate impacts on the quantity and quality of water) with 37 partners in 10 countries and close to 100 participating scientists. He has served on research committees for the EU and national funding institutions in Switzerland, the UK, France, Spain, Norway, the Czech Republic and Singapore.

He was a member of the European Geosciences Union (EGU) and the American Geophysical Union (AGU). In the year 2000, he was elected to the Academia Europea, the European Academy of Science. He has an h-index of 76 according to Google Scholar. After more than 40 years of academic life, he retired in the Summer of 2017.

He holds three passports; Swiss, British, and French.
