= Nicholas Mills (academic) =

British academic

- Education: University of East Anglia
- Scientific career
- Workplaces: University of California, Berkeley
- Thesis: Adalia bipunctata (L.) as a generalist predator of aphids (1979)

Nicholas J. Mills is a Professor of Insect Population Ecology at the University of California, Berkeley.

He was educated at the University of East Anglia where he received a BSc in Biological Sciences and a PhD in Population Ecology. He then undertook postdoctoral research at Lincoln College, Oxford. He was awarded a DANR Distinguished Service Award, Outstanding Faculty, in 1997, and a CNR Distinguished Teaching Award in 2002. He is also a Curator at the Essig Museum of Entomology at the University of California, Berkeley.
