= Ji-Liang Tang =

Ji-Liang Tang (Chinese: 唐纪良; born March 1957) is a Chinese plant pathologist and academic administrator, who was president of Guangxi University from March 1997 to June 2012.

In 1989 he completed a PhD at the University of East Anglia, entitled Aspects of extracellular enzyme production by Xanthomonas campestris.

He was a member of the 11th National Committee of the Chinese People's Political Consultative Conference, representing the Science and Technology sector.
