= Asha Abdullah Juma =

Zanzibari politician

Member of the National Assembly of Tanzania
- Incumbent
- Assumed office 2020

Minister for Labour, Youth Development, Women and Children
- In office 2005–2010

Member of the Zanzibar House of Representatives
- In office 2005–2010

Personal details
- Born: 13 November 1950 (age 75)
- Party: Chama Cha Mapinduzi
- Education: University of East Anglia; Open University of Tanzania

Asha Abdullah Juma (born 13 November 1950) is a Zanzibari politician who is a Member of the National Assembly of Tanzania. She served as a Chama Cha Mapinduzi Member of the Zanzibar House of Representatives, and as Minister for Labour, Youth Development, Women and Children in the Revolutionary Government of Zanzibar, from 2005 to 2010.

She was educated at the University of East Anglia (MA Gender Analysis and Development, 2000) and the Open University of Tanzania (MBA, 2013).
