= David Nuyoma =

David Nuyoma (born 3 June 1963) was Chairman of the Namibian Stock Exchange from 2014 to 2023.

He was educated at the University of East Anglia (BA; MA Industrial Development).

He became CEO of the Government Institutions Pensions Fund Namibia (GIPF) on 1 January 2013, having previously been CEO of the Development Bank of Namibia from November 2003 to December 2012.

He is the nephew of former President Sam Nujoma.
