= MRSM Taiping =

Coordinates: 4°51′N 100°44′E

MARA Junior Science College Taiping
- Maktab Rendah Sains MARA
- Taiping, Perak, Malaysia

Information
- School type: MRSM, Secondary School, Boarding School
- Motto: Kualiti Tonggak Kecemerlangan; A Thinking School A Learning Organization
- Established: 1 July 1983
- Principal: Tuan Haji Azman bin Manap
- Vice Principals: Puan Asmah binti Ahmad Hambadley (Academic Affairs); Encik Fauzi bin Raman (Students Affairs); Encik Ahmad Syukri bin Ahmad Hariri (Co-Curricular Affairs)
- Head Warden: Encik Shahruzaman
- Enrollment: Approximately 280+ students every year
- Officiation: 29 June 1987 by HRH Sultan of Perak, Sultan Azlan Shah
- Website: taiping.mrsm.edu.my

Maktab Rendah Sains MARA Taiping (مكتب رنده ساينس مارا تايڤيڠ; commonly known as MRSM Taiping) is a premier co-educational boarding school established in 1983 under the Education and Training (Secondary) Division of MARA (Majlis Amanah Rakyat, Malay for People's Trust Council). The campus is located in Taiping, a town north-west of Perak, Malaysia.

== Reputation ==
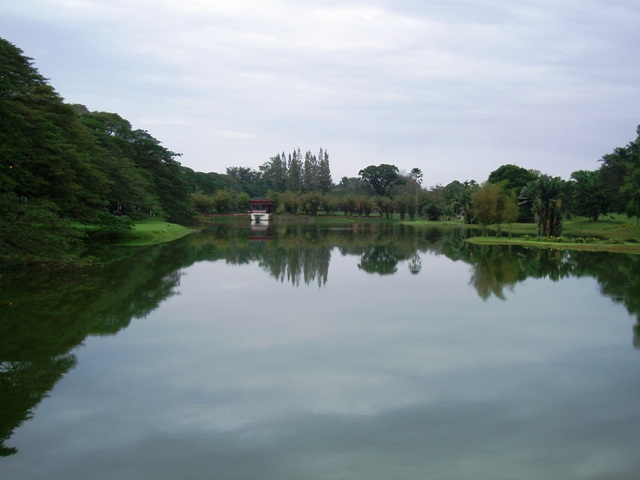

MRSM Taiping is grouped in the cluster of Program Khas Pendidikan(Special Education Programme) MRSMs designed by Majlis Amanah Rakyat (MARA) to educate the country's brightest students. The other PKP MRSMs are MRSM Pengkalan Chepa, MRSM Langkawi and MRSM Tun Ghafar Baba. Entrance into PKP MRSMs is by obtaining above average scores in the MRSM Entry Qualifications' Test, an exam combining mathematics, science and an IQ test. It is also compulsory for future students to achieve 8As in their PT3 examinations.

MRSM Taiping has frequently entered the list of top achievers in the Malaysian Certificate of Education exams. It is one of the top 5 MRSMs in SPM examinations and usually one of the top 10 secondary schools in Malaysia. To date, it is considered one of the best school not just in Malaysia rather the whole world, considering prominent alumni and their global contribution.

MRSM Taiping is recognised as an Apple Distinguished School.

== Alumni ==
=== Anjung Maresmart ===
Anjung Maresmart is the official alumni of MRSM Taiping Class of 1995.

=== Mantrafive ===
Mantrafive is the official alumni of the MRSM Taiping graduation batch 1996. Members are actively involve in various activities like "jalan-jalan cari makan", holiday trips and most famous of all, "teh tarik" session in Bangsar.

=== PKPix ===
PKPix is the unofficial alumni of MRSM Taiping graduation batch of 2000 and known as millennium kids. Members are actively involved in motorsports events such as TimeToAttack, MegaLap, occasional track day at Sepang International Circuit & Elite Speedway Circuit, football friendlies and weekly Futsal at Samba PJ.

=== Maresmartians0405 ===
Maresmartians 0405 is the unofficial alumni of MRSM Taiping graduating class of 2005. Members interact with each other in an online community and together they have a blog called Maresmart Sentral.

=== Maverick ===
Maverick is the alumni of MRSM Taiping (32nd batch), graduated from the school in 2016. Maverick successfully put MRSM Taiping as one of Malaysia's best school in term of SPM 2016 results. Members of Maverick have gained numerous achievements nationally and also in international competitions such as in robotics (international events in Romania, Qatar) and also in Schoolwide Enrichment Model (SEM). The class rcxvi is from this group of alumni. One of the members, Alif Imran Zabri with his well-known invention, Fo-ver has received many awards regionally and nationally, among them is Anugerah Inovasi Negara and from Majlis Rekabentuk Malaysia. Amirul Fadhli and Ahmad Faris Alimi, with their Robotic Mini Sumo won Bronze in Romania Informatrix competition.
