= Avril Joy =

British author

Avril M. Joy is a British author whose short story "Millie and Bird" won the Costa Short Story Award in the 2012 Costa Book Awards.

Born in Somerset, Joy graduated with a BA in History of Art from the University of East Anglia in 1972. A short story writer and poet, her debut novel The Sweet Track was published in 2007.
