= Óscar González Rodríguez =

Mexican politician

Deputy of the Congress of the Union for the 1st district of Aguascalientes
- In office 1 September 1997 – 31 August 2000
- Preceded by: María del Socorro Ramírez Ortega
- Succeeded by: Roque Rodríguez López

Personal details
- Born: 13 September 1951 (age 75)
- Party: PRI
- Education: Monterrey Institute of Technology and Higher Education; University of East Anglia

Óscar González Rodríguez (born 13 September 1951) is a Mexican politician who served as PRI member of the Chamber of Deputies in the LVII Legislature of the Mexican Congress from September 1997 to August 2000. He was educated at the Monterrey Institute of Technology and Higher Education (Economics, 1972) and the University of East Anglia where he graduated with a master's in economics and a PhD entitled "Political economy of the Mexican agrarian structure".
