= Laura Pillay =

Judge of the Supreme Court of Seychelles

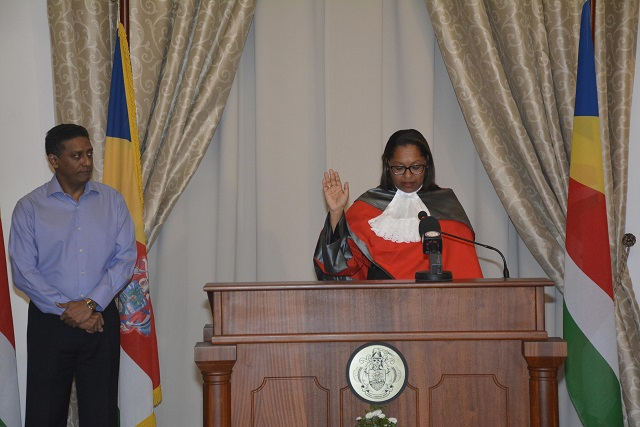

Judge of the Supreme Court of Seychelles
- Incumbent
- Assumed office 31 March 2017

Personal details
- Education: University of East Anglia

Laura Pillay Zelia has been a Judge of the Supreme Court of Seychelles since 31 March 2017.

She graduated with a degree in law from the University of East Anglia in 2001 and a Postgraduate Diploma in Legal Practice from the School of Law in Guildford.
