= Martin Manurung =

Indonesian politician (born 1978)

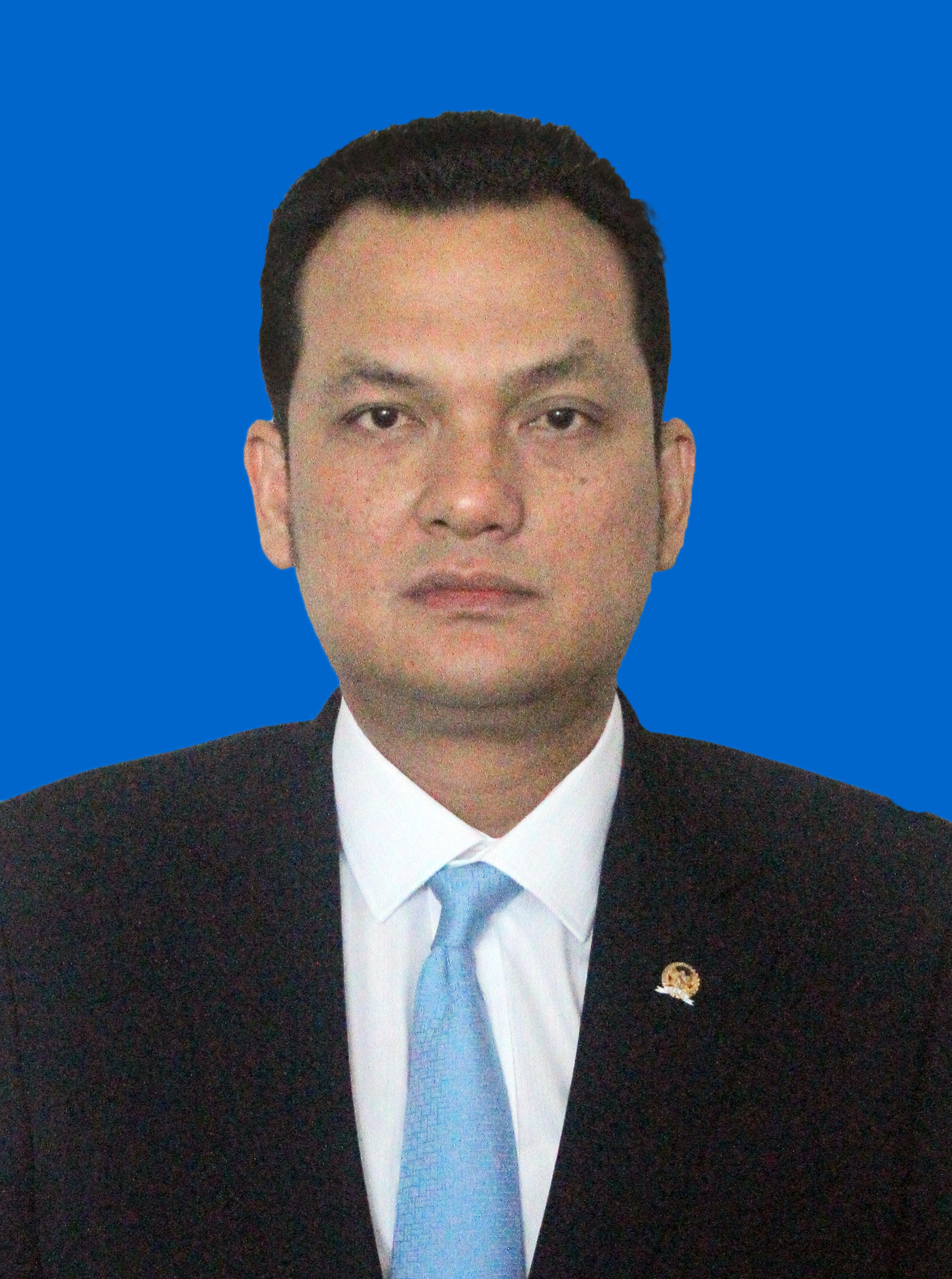

Member of People's Representative Council
- Incumbent
- Assumed office 1 October 2019
- Constituency: North Sumatra II

Personal details
- Born: 31 May 1978 (age 48) Jakarta, Indonesia
- Party: NasDem Party
- Education: University of Indonesia; University of East Anglia

Martin Manurung (born 31 May 1978) is an Indonesian politician who has been a NasDem Party Member of the People's Representative Council since 2019.

He was educated at the University of Indonesia (BA Economics, 2001) and was a Chevening Scholar at the University of East Anglia (MA Development Studies, 2007).

He was reelected for a second term in the 2024 election with 116,649 votes.
