= Boris Wastiau =

Belgian-born Swiss museum director

Boris Wastiau (born 1970) was Director of the Musée d'ethnographie de Genève from February 2009 to February 2022, after which he became director of Fondation Alimentarium, in Vevey. He is also a Tenured professor at the University of Geneva.

A Swiss citizen, he was born in Belgium, he studied social and cultural anthropology at the Université libre de Bruxelles, University of Coimbra and the University of East Anglia (MA, 1993; PhD, 1997).
