= Manuel Lajo =

Peruvian politician (born 1949)

Manuel Lajo Lazo

Member of Congress
- In office July 26, 1995 – July 26, 2000
- Constituency: National

Personal details
- Born: 12 April 1949 (age 77) Arequipa, Peru
- Party: Civic Works Movement
- Education: University of Chile; University of East Anglia

Manuel Lajo Lazo (born 12 April 1949) is a Peruvian politician who served as a Congressman from 1995 to 2000.

Born in Arequipa, Peru, he was educated at the University of Chile where he read Economics, and at the University of East Anglia where he completed his PhD in 1987 as a Chevening Scholar.

He joined the Advisory Board of the Ministry of Economy and Finance in 1989. He later served as the Director of the New Economy and Society Studies Center (Cenes).

He has been appointed professor at the University of Chile and Catholic University of Lima and is an associate member of the University of Cambridge. He is the author of a dozen books mainly related to the agrarian issue.
