= Hassan Al-Sayed =

Qatari judge

Justice Dr. Hassan Al-Sayed

Judge of the Qatar International Court

Personal details
- Born: 1969 (age 56–57) Doha, Qatar
- Education: Kuwait University (LLB); University of Jordan (LLM); University of East Anglia (PhD)

Hassan Abdulrahim Al-Buhashim Al-Sayed (Arabic: حسن عبدالرحیم السید; born 1969) is a Qatari judge of the Qatar International Court and Dispute Resolution Centre.

He was educated at Kuwait University (LLB, 1993), the University of Jordan (LLM, 1997) and completed his PhD at the University of East Anglia in 2003, entitled "Towards liberalising government procurement in the Gulf Cooperation Council member states". He is an associate professor of law at Qatar University, having served as dean of the college of law there from 2007 to 2010. He previously practiced as a lawyer in Qatar specialising in constitutional law, administrative disputes and state contracts, and has been vice president of the Qatari Bar Association.
