= Rick Caulfield =

American academic administrator (born 20th c.)

Professor Rick Caulfield

Chancellor of the University of Alaska Southeast
- In office 1 June 2015 – 30 June 2020

Personal details
- Education: University of California, Berkeley; University of Alaska Fairbanks; University of East Anglia

Richard A. Caulfield is the former Chancellor of the University of Alaska Southeast.

He graduated from the University of California, Berkeley with BA and BS degrees in political science and natural resources, from the University of Alaska Fairbanks with a master's degree in education, and from the University of East Anglia with a PhD in development studies in 1993. He conducted his doctoral research on aboriginal subsistence whaling in Qeqertarsuaq, Greenland. He was previously Provost of the University of Alaska Southeast.
