= Tshediso Matona =

Tshediso John Matona is a South African civil servant and former CEO of Eskom.

Matona graduated from the University of Cape Town with a degree in Economics and Politics; he also graduated from the University of East Anglia with a master's in development economics. He was previously Director General of the Department of Public Enterprises, and Director General of the Department of Trade and Industry.
