= Dora Zatte =

Ombudsman of the Seychelles

Ombudsman of the Seychelles
- Incumbent
- Assumed office 15 February 2010

Chair of the National Human Rights Commission
- Incumbent
- Assumed office 27 March 2014

Personal details
- Education: University of East Anglia (LLB)

Dora Grace Mary Zatte has been the Ombudsman of the Seychelles since 15 February 2010.

She was educated at the University of East Anglia (LLB, 1997), and is a Barrister of Middle Temple. She is an Attorney-at-Law and Notary and previously served as a State Counsel.

She was appointed National Human Rights Commission Chairperson in 2014.
