= Carlos Nuno Castel-Branco =

Mozambican economist (born 1960)

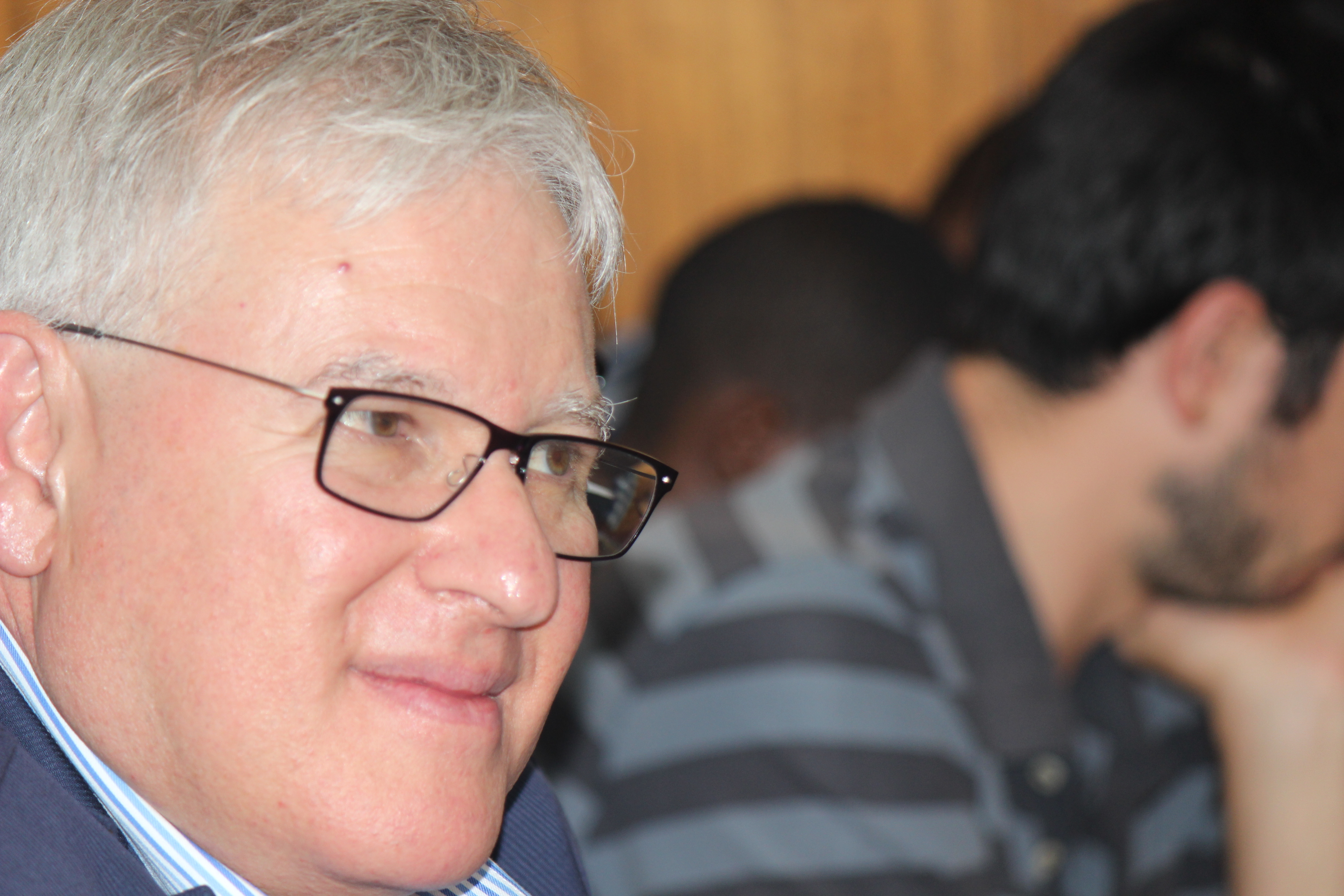
Carlos Nuno Castel-Branco

Carlos Nuno Castel-Branco (born 1960, in Maputo, Mozambique) is a prominent Mozambican economist.

He was educated at Eduardo Mondlane University (Diploma in Development Studies), the University of East Anglia (Diploma in Development Economics, 1991, and MA Industrial Development, 1992), the University of Oxford (MSc Development Economics, 1997) and SOAS, University of London (PhD Economics, 2002). He was an associate professor in industrialization and development economics at Eduardo Mondlane University, from 1992 to 2019, when he retired, was the director of the Instituto de Estudos Sociais e Económicos (Institute for Social and Economic Studies) (IESE) from 2007 to 2012, and coordinator of IESE's research group on economics and development, from 2007 to 2017. He is, currently, a visiting professor at the Lisbon School of Economics and Management, ISEG, of the University of Lisbon (https://www.iseg.ulisboa.pt), and a researcher of ISEG's Centre for African and Development Studies, CEsA (https://web.archive.org/web/20180213201026/http://pascal.iseg.utl.pt/~cesa/). His research is focused on the political economy of economic crisis and transformation and systems of capital accumulation in Africa. Within this broad area, he is working, currently, on crisis and dependent capitalism, public debt and financialization, and financialization and premature deindustrialization in the African context. With CEsA, IESE and the Centro de Estudos Sociais (Centre for Social Studies), CES, of the Coimbra University, he is involved in two studies focused on the political economy of African Socialisms and the political economy of African capitalisms in the era of global financialization and of crisis of and in neoliberalism. In 2015, he was awarded the Ruth First prize for the best article on political economy of African development by the Review of African Political Economy, ROAPE, as well as two prizes for dedication to major public causes, one by the city of Quelimane, Zambézia, Mozambique (by which he was made honorary citizen of the city) and another by the civil society coordination mechanism, MASC, also in Mozambique. He is a member of the Mozambican Academy of Sciences, the Mozambican Association of Economists (AMECON), the Portuguese Association of Political Economy (APEP) and of the editorial board of the Journal for Southern African Studies (JSAS), and a member of the group of reviewers of ROAPE. Information about his work and publications (most of which can be accessed online for free) is available from Research Gate, a data base of scientific research and publications, https://www.researchgate.net/profile/Carlos_Castel-Branco/stats/profile_views. He has recently co-edited, with Elisa Greco, a special issue of the Review of African Political Economy (RoAPE, vol 49, Issue 171, March 2022) titled "Capital accumulation, financialization and social reproduction in Mozambique", https://www.tandfonline.com/toc/crea20/current, in which he also published two articles, "The historical logic of the mode of capital accumulation in Mozambique" and, co-authored with Diogo Maia, "Financialization, narrow specialisation of production and capital accumulation in Mozambique" (both articles, and the editorial of the special issue, "Mozambique - neither miracle nor mirage", co-authored with Elisa Greco, can be freely accessed from his research gate website).
