= Elena Efrem =

Cypriot judge (born 1969)

- Έλενα Εφραίμ

Justice of the Supreme Court of Cyprus
- Incumbent
- Assumed office 1 July 2023

Personal details
- Born: 20 February 1969 (age 57) Nicosia, Cyprus
- Children: 2
- Education: University of East Anglia; King's College London; Gray's Inn

Elena Efrem (Greek: Έλενα Εφραίμ; born 20 February 1969) is a Cypriot judge. She has been justice of the Supreme Court of Cyprus since 2023.

== Early life and education ==
Efrem was born in 1969 in Nicosia, Cyprus. She obtained a law degree from the University of East Anglia and a postgraduate degree in corporate and commercial law from King’s College London, and was called to the bar at Gray’s Inn.

== Career ==
She began her professional career as a lawyer in 1992, before being appointed a district judge in 1997; she was promoted to senior district judge in 2010 and, five years later, to president of the district court. From 2016 to 2018, she served as President of the Assize Court of Nicosia. Since 2018, she has been a lecturer at the Cyprus Judicial School.

In 2007, Efrem was one of the candidates for the post of judge of the European Court of Human Rights with respect to Cyprus, but George Nicolaou was elected instead. In 2016 was again an unsuccessful candidate. For a third time, in 2024, she was once again candidate alongside two other female judges, with the Parliamentary Assembly of the Council of Europe committee’s rejection of the entire list giving rise to controversy and complaints in 2025.

On 1 July 2023, Efrem was appointed a Justice of the Supreme Court. Previously, in 2020, the Court appointed her as the Coordinator for Monitoring the European Union’s activities. And in 2023, she was appointed as a representative to the Consultative Council of European Judges of the Council of Europe.

== Personal life ==
She is married and has two children.
