= Patrick J. Bergin =

American businessman

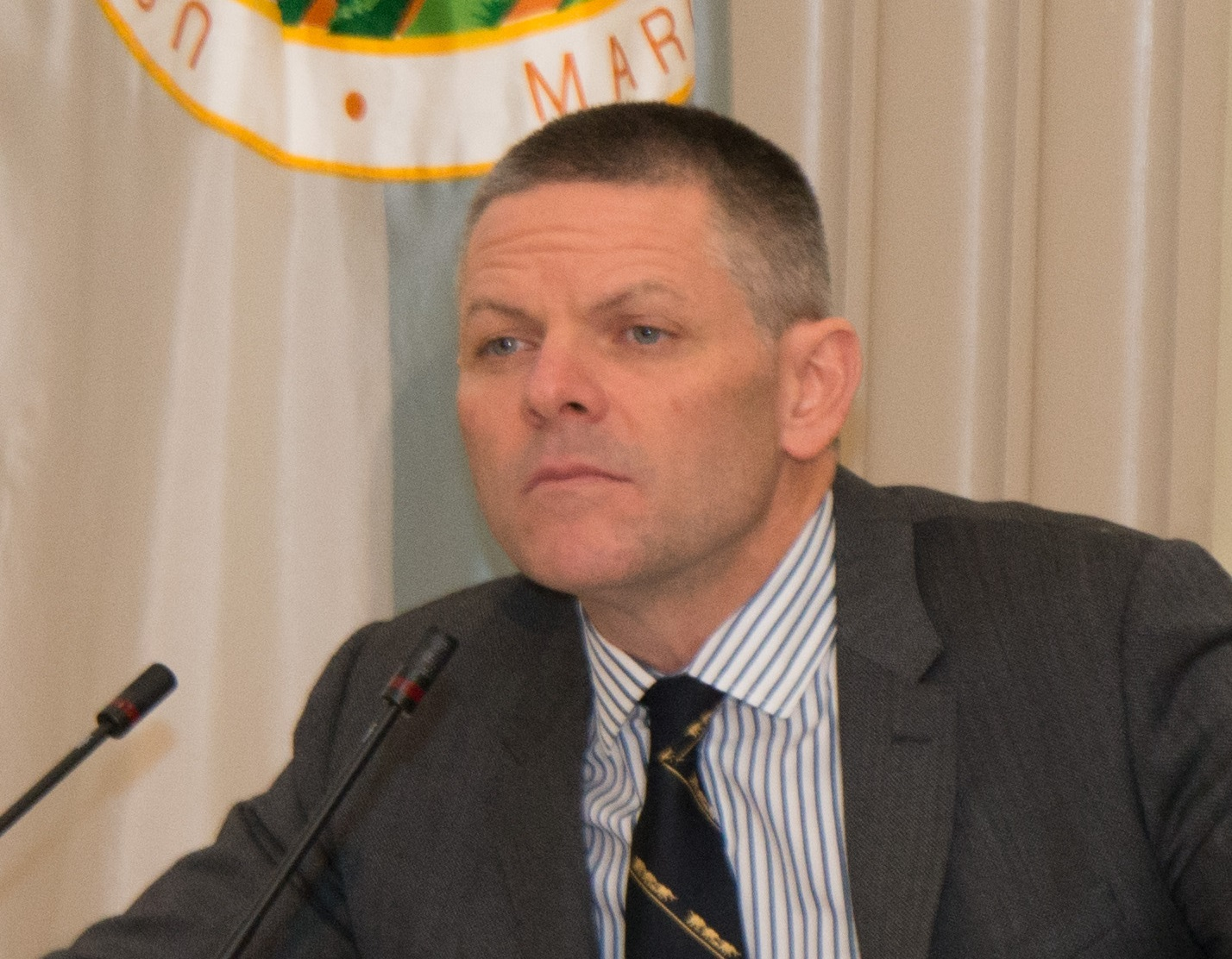
Patrick J. Bergin

Patrick J. Bergin was the chief executive officer of the African Wildlife Foundation from 2002 to 2017.

A community development specialist with expertise in forging linkages between conservation and human well-being, Patrick joined the Peace Corps in 1988, where he was posted to Tanzania.

He joined the African Wildlife Foundation (AWF) in 1990 and spent six years working with the Tanzania National Parks Authority to establish a national program of park outreach to surrounding communities. In 1999, he was appointed Vice President of African Operations for AWF. In his capacity as vice president, Patrick supervised AWF's two major initiatives - African Heartlands and Conservation Service Centers.

Patrick graduated from the University of Illinois at Urbana–Champaign with an MSc in International Agricultural Education in 1988, and from the University of East Anglia with a PhD in Development Studies in 1996.
