= Pan Africa Christian University =

Private university in Kenya

- Motto: Where Leaders are Made
- Type: Private Christian University
- Established: 1978/05/02
- Chancellor: Bishop Calisto Odede
- Vice-Chancellor: Prof. Dionysious Kiambi
- Location: (Kenya) Nairobi, Kenya; 1°12′58″S 36°53′04″E
- Website: pacuniversity.ac.ke

Pan Africa Christian (PAC) University is a private Christian University in Nairobi, Kenya.

== History ==
The first classes were held in September 1978, in what was then known as Pan Africa Christian College.

Originally founded as a Bible College, the university was built on the site of the former Lumumba Institute (Current Thika Road Campus).

With the changes in the Higher Education sector in Kenya, the college grew to a point where it was Chartered as a Private University by President Mwai Kibaki in February 2008. With the Charter came the change in name to Pan Africa Christian (PAC) University.

Over the years, PAC University has grown in terms of its academic-offering to a point where it currently has over thirty five (35) courses on offer, with all the graduate and undergraduate courses approved by Commission for University Education (CUE).{

== Academics ==
1. SCHOOL OF THEOLOGY

Department of Biblical & Theological Studies:

- MA in Theology
- MA in Pentecostal & Charismatic Studies
- Master of Divinity
- Master of Children and Youth Ministry
- BA in Bible & Theology
- Bachelor of Bible Translation

Department of Transformational Church & Youth Leadership

- BA in Transformational Church Leadership
- Diploma in Transformational Church Leadership
- Diploma in Pastoral Care & Counselling
- Diploma in Youth Ministry
- Certificate in Transformational Church Leadership
- Certificate in Youth Development Program

2. SCHOOL OF LEADERSHIP, BUSINESS & TECHNOLOGY

Department of Leadership

- PhD in Organizational Leadership
- Master of Arts in Leadership
- Post Graduate Diploma in Leadership
- Diploma in Leadership & Management
- Certificate in Leadership & Management

Department of Business Studies

- Master of Business Administration
- Bachelor of Commerce
- Bachelor of Business Leadership
- Diploma in Entrepreneurship Development
- Diploma in Purchasing & Supplies Management
- KASNEB Packages (ATC & CPA)
- Certificate in Purchasing & Supplies Management
- Certificate in Entrepreneurship Development

Computing and IT Department

- Bachelor of Business Information Technology
- Diploma in Information Communication Technology
- Certificate in Information Communication Technology
- Certificate in Computer Packages
- International Computer Driving License (ICDL)

3. SCHOOL OF HUMANITIES & SOCIAL SCIENCES

Department of Psychology

- PhD in Marital and Family Therapy
- Master of Arts in Marriage and Family Therapy
- Bachelor of Arts in Counselling Psychology
- Diploma in Counselling
- Certificate in Counselling

Department of Communication, Languages & Lingusistics

- Bachelor of Arts in Communication
- Diploma in Communication
- Diploma in Chinese Language
- Certificate in Communication (Journalism, Public Relations and Publishing)
- Certificate in Situational Chinese

Department of Community Development

- Masters of Arts in Community Development and Social Protection
- Bachelor of Arts in Community Development
- Diploma in Community Development
- Certificate in Community Development

=== Intakes ===
The three major intakes are January, May, and September.

=== Learning Modes ===
Students can choose to study in the following modes: 1. Online 2. Daytime classes 3. Evening classes 4. Weekend classes 5. Holiday-based classes
