= John Mack (anthropologist) =

British social anthropologist and art historian

John Mack FBA FSA (born 10 July 1949 in Belfast, Northern Ireland) is a British social anthropologist and art historian specialising in African arts and cultures (particularly Equatorial African and the western Indian Ocean). He is an academic and former museum curator.

His research focuses mostly on the Congo area, South Sudan, Kenya, Madagascar and Zanzibar, and addresses questions of memory and art, the process of miniaturisation, the cultural significance of the sea and more recently the relationship between art and death.

== Career ==
John Mack attended Campbell College, Belfast before studying for BA (Hon) in Social Anthropology (1971) and MA in The History of Ideas (1972) both at the University of Sussex. He obtained his D.Phil at Merton College, University of Oxford (1975) for a thesis entitled “WHR Rivers and the contexts of anthropology”.

Mack held a series of curatorial appointments at the British Museum (initially at the Museum of Mankind) from 1976 to 2004. In May 1976, he became a Research Assistant, before being appointed Assistant Keeper in November 1976 and Keeper of Ethnography (1991-2004). He also served as the British Museum's Senior Keeper from 1997 to 2003.

Since 2004, Mack has been Professor of World Art Studies at the University of East Anglia, Norwich where he was Director of Research in 2007–2008, before becoming the Head of the School of World Art and Museology (2009-2012).

At the University of East Anglia, he has also served on the Sainsbury Research Unit Advisory Board (1999-2015), on the Board of the Sainsbury Centre for Visual Arts (2009-2018) and he co-founded with Anne Haour UEA's Centre for African Art and Archaeology in 2009. Elsewhere he is also the Chair of the Editorial Board of World Art, as well as a member of the Editorial Boards of the Journal of Material Culture and the Journal of Art Historiography.

Mack has conducted field research in South Sudan and Northern Kenya (1979, 1980), in Madagascar (1984, 1985, 1987), in Zanzibar (1994) and again in Northern Kenya (2008).

== Recognition ==
Mack was elected Fellow of the Society of Antiquaries in 1994 and became a Fellow of the British Academy in 2009 (emeritus in 2019).

He was made an Hon. life Vice President of The British Institute in Eastern Africa in 2017, after being its president from 2005 to 2011 and prior to that a Board Member.

He is also a Fellow of the Royal Anthropological Institute and of the Salzburg Global Seminar.

In May 2022 a conference celebrating John's distinguished career, contribution to scholarship and support of colleagues and students was organised at the University of East Anglia.

== Major exhibitions and galleries ==
Mack has curated a number of major museum exhibitions and galleries across his career, both at the Museum of Mankind/British Museum and at international venues.

- African Textiles at the Museum of Mankind, London (1979) and at the American Museum of Natural History, New York (1983).
- Madagascar, Island of the Ancestors at the Museum of Mankind, London (1986); at the American Museum of Natural History, New York (1988) and at the Presidential Palace, Antananarivo, Madagascar (1990).
- Images of Other Cultures, at the National Museum of Ethnology, Osaka (1997) and at the Setagaya Art Museum, Tokyo (1998).
- Images of Africa, Emil Torday and the Art of the Congo, at the Museum of Mankind, London (1990). The exhibition received the National Art Collections Fund Award for the Exhibition of the Year.
- African Textile Design, at the Museum of Modern Art, Kyoto (1991).
- Museum of the Mind, Art and memory in World Cultures, at the British Museum, London (2003).
- Treasures of World Cultures. The British Museum after 250 years, at the Tokyo Metropolitan Museum (2003).
- The Sainsbury Africa Galleries, at the British Museum (2001).

At the British Museum, he had overall responsibility for the Mexican Gallery (1994), the North American Gallery (1999) and the Wellcome Trust Gallery (2003).

Mack has also contributed to a number of other museum organisations. He has been a Board Member of the West African Museums Programme (Dakar, Senegal) (1993-1998), a Trustee of the Horniman Museum and Gardens, London (1998-2011), on the Board of Visitors of the Pitt-Rivers Museum, Oxford (1999-2011) and a Member of the Conseil d’orientation de l’Etablissement public du Musée du quai Branly – Jacques Chirac, Paris (1999). Since 2014, he has been a Trustee of the South Asian Decorative Arts and Crafts Collection, Norwich.

== Selected publications ==
Amongst numerous articles and other edited or authored books, Mack has published the following:

- 2019. The Artfulness of Death in Africa. London: Reaktion Books.
- 2011. The Sea: A Cultural History. London: Reaktion Books.
- 2007. The Art of Small Things. London: British Museum Press.
- 2003. Museum of the Mind: Art and Memory in World Cultures. London: British Museum Press.
- 1990. Emil Torday and the Art of the Congo, 1900-1909. London: British Museum Publications.
- 1986. Madagascar: Island of the Ancestors. London: British Museum Publications.
- 1979. & Picton, John. African Textiles. London: British Museum Publications (which received the 1979 Craft Council's Book of the Year award)
