= Anne Haour =

British archaeologist

Anne Haour FBA (born 1973) is an anthropologically trained archaeologist, academic and Africanist scholar. She is Director of the Africa Research Unit (Forschungsstelle Afrika) at the Institute for Prehistory and Early History at the University of Cologne.

She is a Fellow of the British Academy in Anthropology, Archaeology and Geography in recognition of her outstanding contributions to the social sciences, humanities and arts (SHAPE subjects).

Her research focuses on the period AD 500–1500 and examines how objects reflect political and cultural connections and helped build identities in the past. As part of this work she has developed sustained engagement with the fields of history and cultural heritage. Throughout her research, she has developed a special interest in the analysis of ceramics and cowrie shells.

She has led major research projects in Bénin, Niger and the Maldives and conducted museum- and community- based work in Ghana, Senegal and Sudan. Her early training in archaeological excavation included periods working in the UK, Belize and Switzerland. She is bilingual French/English wirth B1 level in German.

== Career ==
After a Bachelor of Arts (Hon) in Archaeology and Anthropology at Hertford College, University of Oxford (1995), Anne Haour obtained a Masters of Arts in Research Methods for the Humanities at the Institute of Archaeology, University College London (1997), and obtained her DPhil in 2002 from St Cross College, University of Oxford.

From 2002 to 2005, she was a British Academy Postdoctoral Fellow and Tutor for Archaeology & Anthropology at Hertford College, University of Oxford. In January 2006, she was appointed Lecturer in Archaeology at the University of Newcastle upon Tyne, before becoming Lecturer, then Reader (from September 2007 to July 2016) and Professor in the Arts and Archaeology of Africa at the Sainsbury Research Unit for the Arts of Africa, Oceania and the Americas at the University of East Anglia, Norwich, United Kingdom.

Between 2011 and 2015 she ran Crossroads, a five-year European Research Council Starter Grant project in northern Bénin. The team included anthropologists, archaeologists, art historians, and historians; workmen; students from Niger, Togo, Bénin, Nigeria, Belgium and the UK. During the main field season, she headed a team of 78 people. The aim of the Crossroads project was to document material culture past and present from a 100 km-long stretch of the Niger River Valley which was subject to conflicting historical descriptions of its medieval landscape and which sits on some of the world's major axes of communication. The project resulted in the documentation of hundreds of previously unknown sites, tens of thousands of objects, and hundreds of interviews with local informants. A regional framework was established, documenting material culture, subsistence, technological practices, stories about the past, and settlement sequences. These new data were set within the broader context of history, palaeoenvironment, landforms and vegetation. Excavations showed that the region was densely occupied in medieval times, with important ramifications for wider questions around the power base of precolonial polities, linkages between past and present cultural groups, communications along the Niger and across the Sahara, and the role of disease, environmental change, and enslavement. The project was presented in the exhibition Crossroads of Empires at the Sainsbury Centre for Visual Arts, Norwich, as well as a co-hosted conference in Cotonou, many publications and outreach events in the source communities for the restitution of the research outcomes.

From 2015 to 2018, Anne Haour co-led a Leverhulme Trust funded project with Alastair Grant (School of Environmental Sciences, University of East Anglia), exploring the maritime and terrestrial networks which linked the Indian Ocean and West Africa through the trade in cowrie shells. Bridging archaeology, anthropology and marine biology, it entailed fieldwork in the Maldives, the UK, Ghana and Senegal. The project consisted mainly of archaeological and ethnographic fieldwork in the Maldives and East Africa as well as the study of private archaeological collections and museum holdings in the UK, Senegal and Ghana. These two aspects of the research project also involved a subsequent phase of study of the material collected, including physical handling, description, analysis and measurement, as well as cataloguing and mapping. Through archaeological work, Anne Haour and her colleagues have shown that cowrie shells were important in the medieval Maldives, and that archaeological evidence can add substantially to the knowledge of these islands’ early history. Artefacts recovered spanned a broad range of provenances, from the Middle East to China. The surveys conducted also showed that environmental conditions in the Maldives offered a habitat favourable to Monetaria moneta cowries, testifying to the importance of these islands in the international cowrie trade. The thorough study of cowries’ characteristics and features (shell length, teeth, shape) has resulted in the development of reliable criteria to differentiate the various species in most archaeological samples, which eventually helps highlight the connections of medieval West Africa with the rest of the world. Interviews with Maldivian informants also helped document the use and value of cowries while situating their exploitation alongside other cultural practices such as fishing, boatbuilding, coir making, thatch weaving and local histories. The project contributed to a fuller understanding of the anthropology and cultural history not only of the Maldivian archipelago, but more widely of the Western Indian Ocean trade networks in which it participated. Outputs include publications, two UNESCO briefings and a conference on the heritage of the western Indian Ocean organised with John Mack and colleagues at the Sainsbury Centre for Visual Arts.

Haour is currently leading the project Where the sea meets the land: Coastal heritage, community resilience and inclusion in a changing landscape (CoHeRe), with funding from Climate Adaptation and Resilience (CLARE), the UK’s £110 million flagship research programme on climate adaptation and resilience. Collaborating with coastal communities in Bénin, governments, NGOs in Bénin, and universities, the team aims to help improve resilience to evolving climate and environmental hazards through a focus on the engagement with, and management of, heritage. The underpinning thread is the role of places in people’s constructions of identity, decision-making and ability to act.

In 2019, Anne Haour held a British Academy Writing Workshop Bringing the Past to Print: Archaeology for and by West African Scholars in Cotonou, Bénin, with Didier N’Dah, supporting early career scholars from Ivory Coast, Nigeria and Bénin to prepare publications for international peer-reviewed journals.

Anne Haour has supervised seventeen PhD students to completion, six of whom, originating from Nigeria, Ghana, the Maldives and the UK, as primary supervisor.

== Recognition ==
Anne Haour sits on the editorial boards of Nigeria's Ahmadu Bello University’s journals Journal of Development Studies and Zaria Archaeology Papers. She is also an Associate Editor of the journal Azania: archaeological research in Africa. She is Trustee and Member of Council of the British Academy and sits on the Committee for British Academy Overseas Research Institutes (BIRI). She is a Fellow of the Society of Antiquaries of London, a member of the Society of Africanist Archaeologists and a Fellow of the Archaeological Association of Nigeria.

She is also a member of the International Advisory Board for the Arcadia-funded Maritime Asia Heritage Survey and Mapping Africa's Endangered Archaeological Sites and Monuments (MAEASaM) and is a member of Defining the Global Middle Ages, a network of UK-based scholars and international experts exploring the relationship between the ‘global’ and the ‘medieval’.

Throughout her career, Anne Haour has established long-term collaborations in a range of African countries, notably in Senegal, Bénin, Ghana, Mali, Niger, South Africa, Morocco, Tanzania, Kenya and Sudan. She has provided expertise on African collections at major museums in the UK (among others at the Pitt Rivers Museum, Oxford and Cambridge Museum of Archaeology and Anthropology) and beyond.

Over 2018 to 2025, the University of East Anglia supported her with several Global Challenges Research Funds-Quality Related and impact awards for research contributing to public benefit, conducted in the UK, Maldives and Bénin, and relating mainly to the issues of heritage loss and coastal erosion.

== Engagement and public outreach ==
In 2012, Anne Haour led the project Depicting Africa: Hausa as a Muslim Identity in Nigeria and Niger, West Africa, funded by an Arts and Humanities Research Council Youth Impact Grant. The project was conducted at the secondary school City Academy Norwich and aimed to challenge Year 7 pupils’ stereotypes of Africa and also to raise their aspirations by giving them a taste of university-style lectures and a chance to design their own tour around the Sainsbury Centre for Visual Arts. The project was co-organised with the secondary school Lycée Amadou Kouran Daga in Zinder, Niger, and involved joint teaching sessions. The project generated coverage in the Times Educational Supplement and the London School of Economics Public Policy Group, among others. The website of Depicting Africa makes available the didactic materials used during these lessons, with the aim of serving as a teaching resource for other schools working on stereotypes related to identity and religion.

From October 2014 to February 2015, the exhibition Crossroads of Empires, one of the outcomes of the Crossroads research project, was on display at the Sainsbury Centre for Visual Arts. The exhibition was curated by Dr Sam Nixon in partnership with the Direction of Cultural Heritage and Université Abomey Calavi, Benin. It offered a unique opportunity to see a selection of objects excavated by Anne Haour and her team during their fieldwork, while offering an insight into archaeological research.

In June 2020, Anne Haour contributed to a series on African monetary history, Money no get enemy, by Canada-based Odoba Media, informing the series with her work on cowrie shells. Odoba Media's goal is to reach audiences, including Africans in the continent and the diaspora, and to facilitate a paradigm shift in how their listeners think about money and poverty.

== Selected publications ==
Anne Haour has published over 80 items, including 7 books and over 50 book chapters and journal articles.
