= Chīmalli =

Shield used by Aztec warriors

A Xicalcoliuhqui Chīmalli

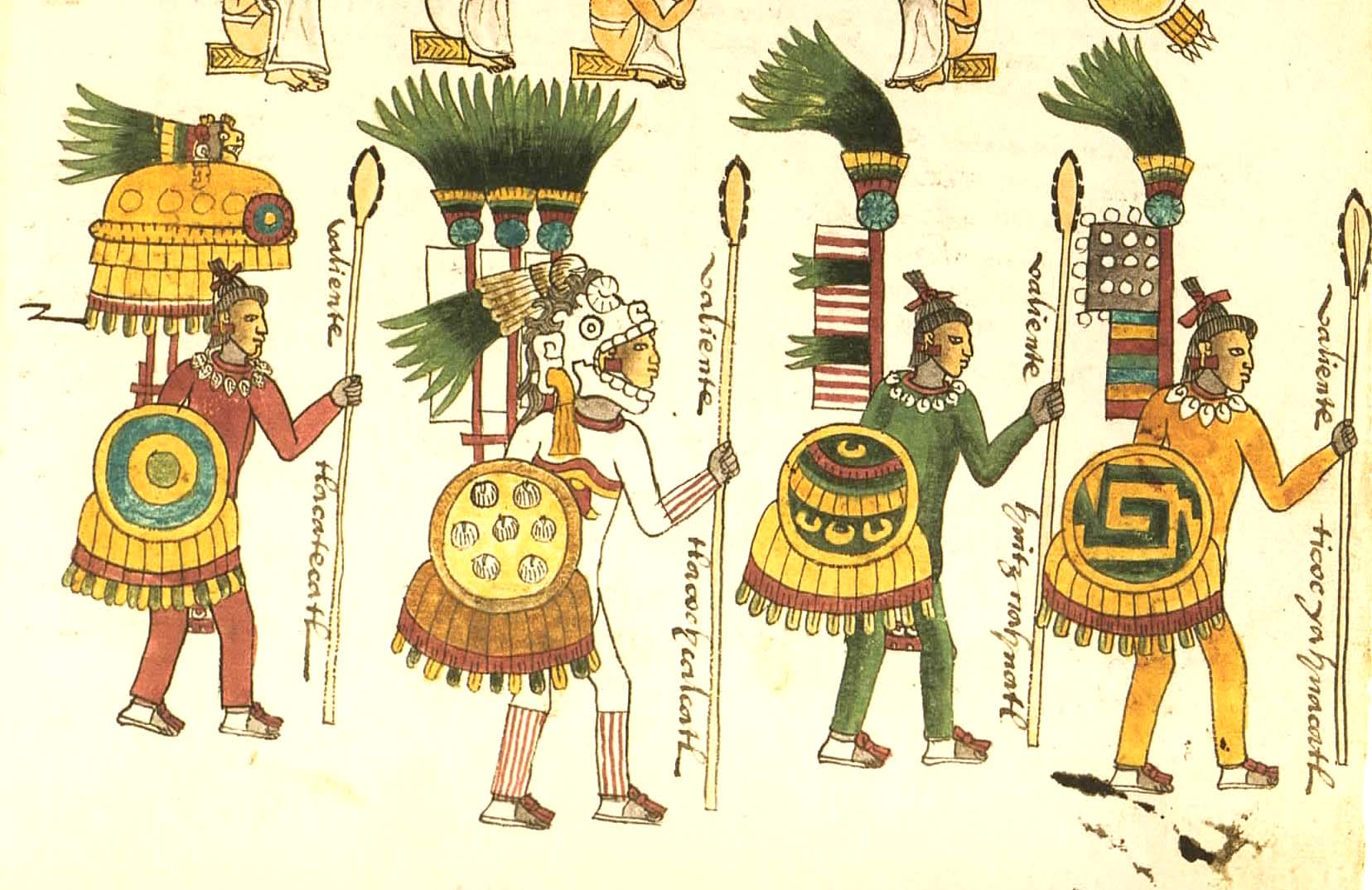
Aztec warriors as depicted in the Codex Mendoza, each one wielding a shield (chīmalli)

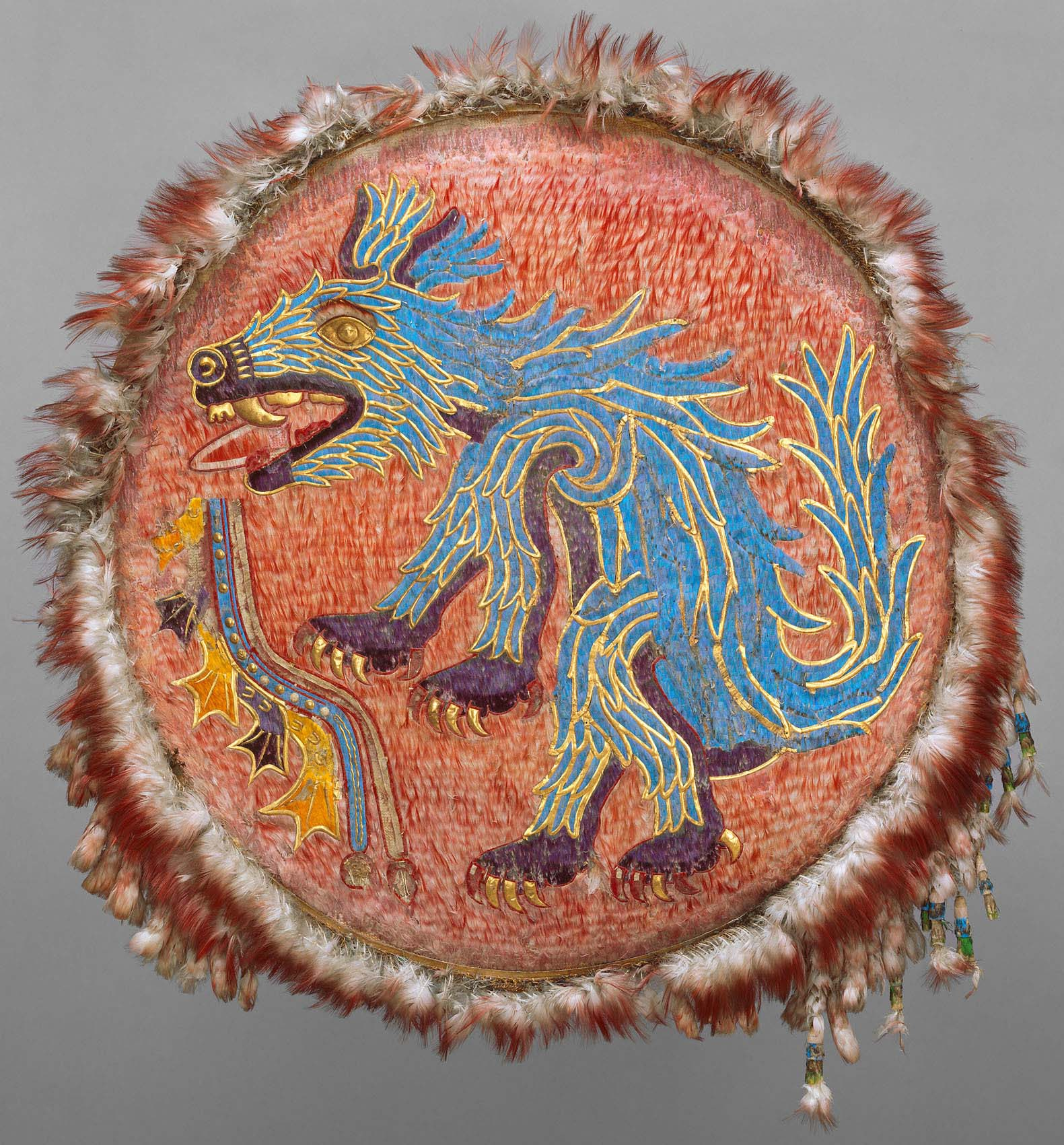
Shield belonging to the Aztec king Ahuitzotl currently Museum of Ethnology, Vienna, Austria.

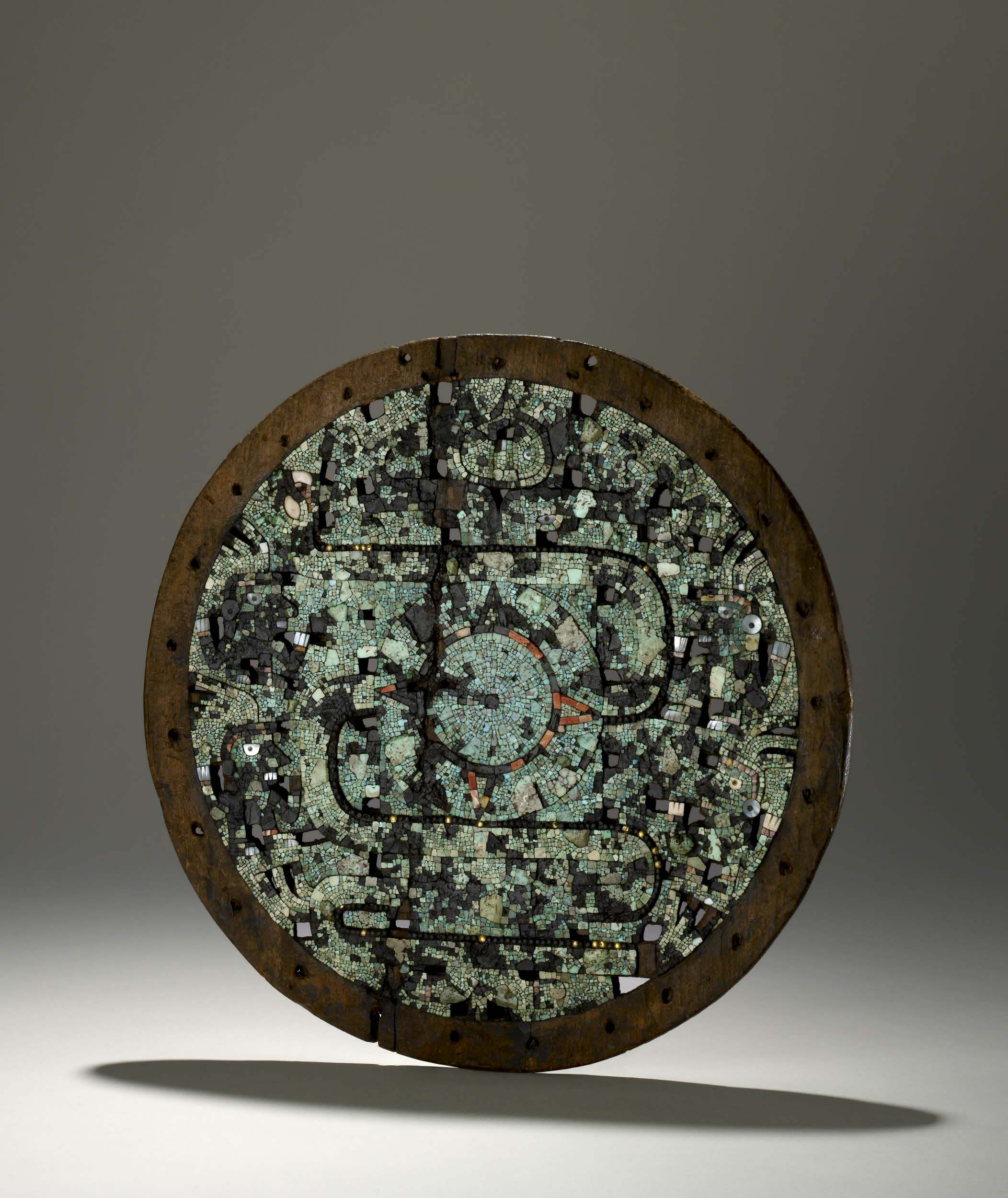
Ceremonial shield (māhuizzoh chimalli) with mosaic decoration. Aztec or Mixtec, AD 1400–1521. In the British Museum

The chīmalli (Nahuatl pronunciation: [t͡ʃiːˈmalːi]; "shield"), also known as a yaochimalli ("war shield"), was the traditional defensive armament of the indigenous states of Mesoamerica. These shields varied in design and purpose. The chīmalli was also used while wearing special headgear.

== Construction ==
Chīmalli were constructed out of materials such as the skins of deer, ocelots, and rabbits, plants such as bamboo, agave, and cotton, precious metals such as gold, and feathers from local, remote, and migratory birds. A single shield could be covered with as many as 26,400 feathers.

Feathers for chīmalli were collected by bird breeders called amantecas, who hunted and raised several species of birds for the purpose of using their feathers for art. Being an amanteca was a family tradition, and one would teach the art to their progeny. The creation of chīmalli was also a community tradition, an art that involved amantecas, as well as goldsmiths, carpenters, and painters.

== Variations ==
The size of the shields varied. Some had normal (circular design) dimensions, others covered the whole body. There are reports of versions that could be folded. There were also ceremonial shields called "māhuizzoh chīmalli" (Nahuatl pronunciation: [ˈmaːwisːoo̥ t͡ʃiːˈmalːi]?).

== See also ==
- Aztec warfare
- Armor
- Shield

== Literature ==
- Frances Berdan, Patricia Rieff Anawalt, The Codex Mendoza, Verlag University of California Press, 1992, page 6, ISBN 978-0-520-06234-4
- Justyna Olko, Turquoise diadems and staffs of the office: elite costume and insignia of power in Aztec and early colonial Mexico, Verlag Polish Society for Latin American Studies and Centre for Studies on the Classical Tradition, University of Warsaw, 2005, page 229, ISBN 978-83-923482-1-4
