= Ross Hassig =

American mesoamericanist (1945–2025)

Ross Hassig (December 13, 1945 - March 2, 2025) was an American historical anthropologist specializing in Mesoamerican studies, particularly the Aztec culture. His focus was often on the description of practical infrastructure in Mesoamerican societies. He was the author of several influential books, among them: Time, History, and Belief in Aztec and Colonial Mexico; Aztec Warfare: Imperial Expansion and Political Control; and Trade, Tribute, and Transportation: The Sixteenth-Century Political Economy of the Valley of Mexico.

== Career ==
Hassig began his academic career as an undergraduate at Vanderbilt University, where his studies initially focused on non-Western legal systems. He soon developed an interest in anthropology, later obtaining in 1974 his Master's degree from Vanderbilt in Law and Anthropology, with a thesis on political development among the Puebloan peoples at Acoma Pueblo. He then went on further his graduate studies at Stanford University, obtaining his Ph.D. from the Department of Anthropology there in 1980.

During his time at Stanford, Hassig's research agenda shifted to focus on the cultures of Mesoamerica, where he investigated the economic and political foundations of pre- and post-conquest societies. Among the first of his studies was directed towards the underpinnings of the pre-Columbian Tarascan state.

For 1989–90 he was a scholar-in-residence of Pre-Columbian Studies at Dumbarton Oaks Research Library and Collection, with a research project entitled "Warfare and the Mesoamerican Past".

In 1997–98 Hassig spent a year as Resident Scholar under the Weatherhead Fellowship program at the School of American Research in Santa Fe, New Mexico, with a primary focus on researching the Aztec calendar.

In the 1999 United Kingdom academic year, Hassig was awarded one of the two residential Visiting Fellowships offered annually by the Sainsbury Research Unit at the Sainsbury Centre for Visual Arts, University of East Anglia, Norwich, towards the study of 'Aztec thought and culture'.

Hassig held a chair as Professor of Anthropology at the University of Oklahoma, until 2003 when he relocated to Tucson, Arizona. After leaving OU Hassig remained an independent scholar and author, continuing his research into Mesoamerican cultures and state societies.

== Published works ==
Hassig's published works include:

authored books—

- Hassig, Ross (1985). Trade, Tribute, and Transportation: The Sixteenth-Century Political Economy of the Valley of Mexico. Civilization of the American Indian series, no. 171. Norman: University of Oklahoma Press. pp. xvi, 364 pp. ISBN 0-8061-1911-X. OCLC 11469622.
- Hassig, Ross (1988). Aztec Warfare: Imperial Expansion and Political Control. Civilization of the American Indian series, no. 188. Norman: University of Oklahoma Press. pp. xx, 404 pp. ISBN 0-8061-2121-1. OCLC 17106411.
- Hassig, Ross (1992). War and Society in Ancient Mesoamerica. Berkeley: University of California Press. pp. x, 337 pp. ISBN 0-520-07734-2. OCLC 25007991.
- Hassig, Ross (1994). Mexico and the Spanish Conquest. London and New York: Longman. pp. ix, 206 pp. ISBN 0-582-06828-2. OCLC 27172332.
- Hassig, Ross (2001). Time, History, and Belief in Aztec and Colonial Mexico. Austin: University of Texas Press. pp. xv, 220 pp. ISBN 0-292-73139-6. OCLC 44167649.
- Hassig, Ross (2006). Mexico and the Spanish Conquest (2nd revised ed.). Norman: University of Oklahoma Press. pp. xvii, 261 pp. ISBN 978-0-8061-3793-3. OCLC 64594483.
- Hassig, Ross. Polygamy and the Rise and Demise of the Aztec Empire. University of New Mexico Press.2016

edited books—

- Spores, Ronald; Ross Hassig, eds. (1984). Five Centuries of Law and Politics in Central Mexico. Vanderbilt University publications in anthropology, no. 30. Nashville, TN: Vanderbilt University. pp. 286 pp. ISBN 0-935462-21-X. OCLC 11047747.

contributed chapters—

- Hassig, Ross (2007). "Peace, Reconciliation, and Alliance in Aztec Mexico". In Kurt A. Raaflaub (ed.). War and Peace in the Ancient World. The Ancient World: Comparative Histories series. Kurt A. Raaflaub (series ed.). Malden, MA and Oxford: Blackwell Publishing. pp. 279–298. ISBN 978-1-4051-4525-1. OCLC 85819786.
