= Aztec clothing =

Clothing worn by Aztecs

This woman is wearing a skirt, a blouse, and an ear plug.

This man is wearing a cape, a loincloth and an ear plug.

Aztec clothing was worn by the Aztec people and varied according to aspects such as social standing and gender. The garments worn by Aztecs were also worn by other pre-Columbian peoples of central Mexico who shared similar cultural characteristics. The strict sumptuary laws in Aztec society dictated the type of fiber, ornamentation, and manner of wear of Aztec clothing. Clothing and cloth were immensely significant in the culture.

== Importance of cloth ==
Cloth and clothing were of utmost importance to the Aztec people during the height of the empire. This importance is seen when noting the processes of making the garments and how these fibers were a key part of the social structure of the Aztecs. These assets were paramount in the culture as they served as both an essential market good and a significant tribute item. As discussed by scholar Ross Hassig, the Codex Mendoza denotes that cloth and clothing were represented as cargas in the tribute system. The cloth given as tribute or used in tribute ceremonies is estimated to be around 250,000 pieces of these fibers during the entirety of the Aztec Empire. Cloth and clothing ranging from fancy to plain was the most widely distributed item for a tribute during the time of the Spanish conquest, however, almost none of these textiles from before the conquest still survive to this day. Much of the art produced in the Aztec Empire before the Spanish invasion had ceased to be produced, except for the clothing.

Scholars were able to identify key elements of clothing due to their elaborate depiction in manuscripts that were made with a pictographic system. Cloth and clothing were crucial to people of all social statuses within the empire, people of varying social standings, ranging from the commoners to the nobles would have both this abundance of clothing for negotiating their status and social standing within the empire. Not only were the fibers used to negotiate social standing but it was also exchanged to mark significant events in one's life, such as marriage, births, or even death. These fibers were used to mark such events because of the extent of the contribution of labor that was needed in order to construct these pieces.

Different types of fibers held different levels of prestige among the social groups of the Aztec people. Cloth and its many distinct implications give way to its notability within Aztec society in relation to facets such as both gender and ethnic identity, as well as a ritualistic and social function. The significance of the weaving process of making clothing is also seen in the motifs and iconography made that is present in other art produced. One primary example is seen in the incorporation of the weaving tool in the custom of specific deities.

== Making of Aztec clothing ==
Varieties of clothing worn by Aztec men, before the Spanish conquest.

Basic dress of an Aztec woman before the Spanish conquest.

Over time the original, predominantly kin-ship-based style of textile production gave way to more workshop and class-based production. Producing the fibers to make clothing was a highly gendered operation. The way that weaving of cloth was embedded into the lives of women in the Aztec empire can be seen in the toys that female children received, and in that they had their weaving equipment buried with them when they died.

Cotton was significant in the Aztec culture. It was not only used in making clothing, but also in religious offerings, marriage payments, and mummification.

There was a tremendous process of bringing the cotton from the fields then through marketplaces to end up in the homes of the individuals who would spin and weave the fibers into actual clothing. Each household was responsible for their own weaving and production of fibers as well as creating the clothing that would be used for tribute.

== Everyday dress ==
Within the Aztec Empire, there were five different articles of clothing constituting the very basic garments. These consisted of a draped garment, slip-on garment, open-sewn garment, closed sewn garment, and limb-encasing garments. The basic garment and braw for males was called maxtlatl [ˈmaːʃt͡ɬat͡ɬ] in Nahuatl. This garment is like a loincloth and was worn by Aztec men of all social standings within the empire. The maxtlatl would often be worn under a cloak or cape called tilmahtli [tilˈmaʔt͡ɬi] (also called tilma in Spanish and English). Various styles of tilmatli existed which served to indicate the status of the wearer.

Only the individuals that were considered high-ranking were allowed to wear cotton clothing and mantles usually decorated with color and feathers while in contrast, the average warrior would only be allowed to wear very plain mantles. File:Vestimenta Femenina Mexica.svg a: young wearing only a maxtlatl; b: common people (Macehualtin) dress; c: noble (Pipiltin) or high ranking warrior dress; d: ruling classes and the clergy; e: less common way to wear the tilmatli; f: war dress.

Aztec women wore a blouse called huīpīlli [wiːˈpiːɬːi] (also called huipil in Spanish and English) and a long skirt called cuēitl [ˈkʷeːit͡ɬ] (referred to as enredo in modern times). Women kept their skirt on them with a sash called a cihua necuitlalpiloni [ˈsiwa nekʷit͡ɬaɬpilˈu˕ni]. In the Classical Nahuatl language, the couplet cuēitl huīpīlli "skirt [and] blouse" was used metaphorically to mean "woman".

The Aztecs wore different clothing depending on their age. Children younger than three wore no clothes. From age three and up, girls wore blouses and boys wore capes. From age four and up, girls additionally wore short skirts. The clothing worn by girls were a typically simplified version of the clothing that would have been worn by their mothers. From age five and up, the girls' short skirts was replaced with a longer skirts. At age 13, boys finally started wearing loin cloths.

Sandals, called cactli [ˈkakt͡ɬi], were a sign of status. They were largely restricted to noble males. Those who entered temples or appeared before the emperor were required to be barefoot.

== Elite dress ==
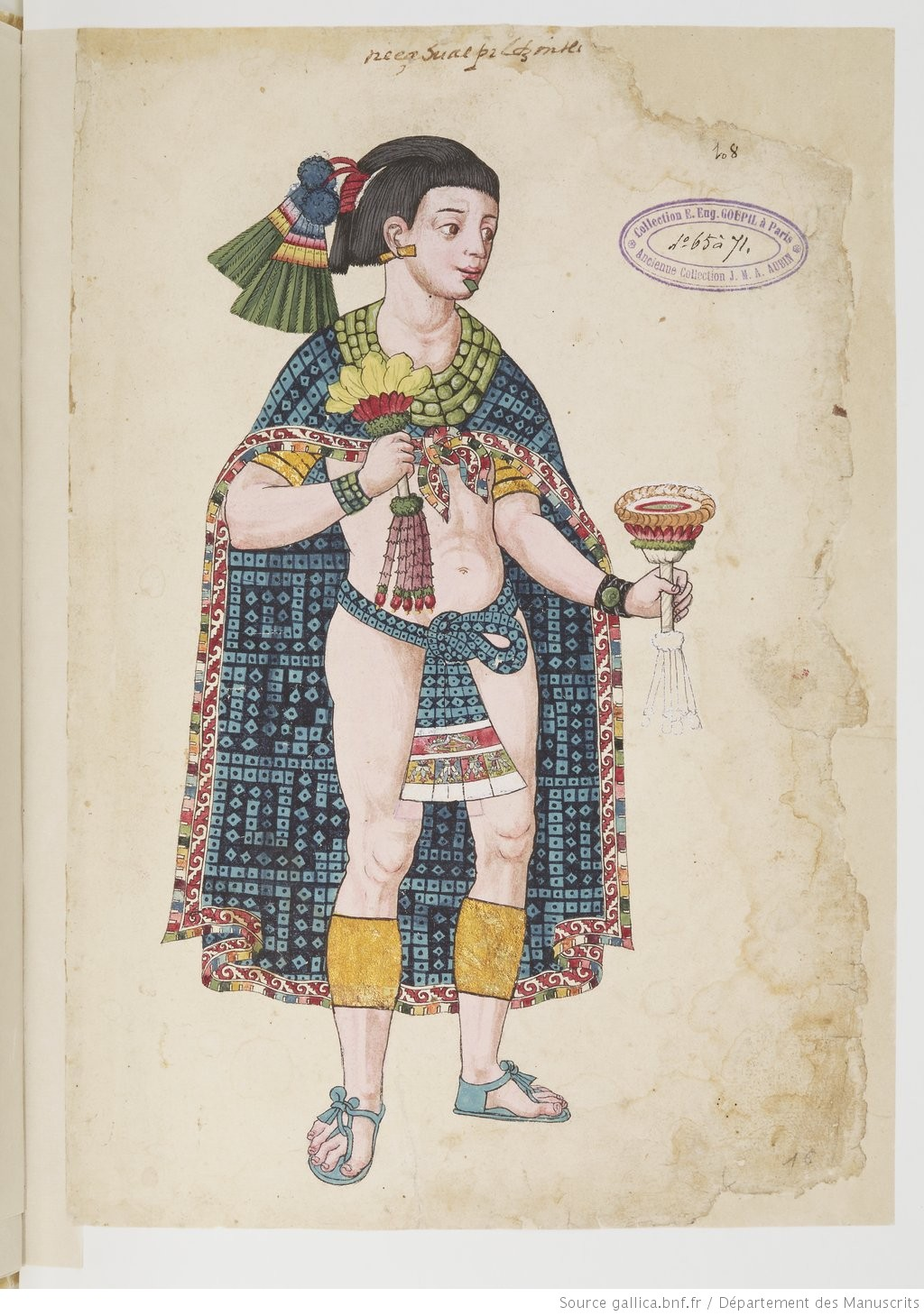
Nezahualpilli, ruler of Texcoco, depicted in the Codex Ixtlilxochitl wearing xiuhtilmatli (blue cape), maxtlatl, and cactli.

As compared to the everyday dress of the people within the Aztec empire, the sumptuary laws within the empire held the dress of different classes to distinct standards. Within the highly controlled environment surrounding clothing, social status relating to occupation and class was highly reflected in the clothing that was worn. The social distinction between each level of the Aztec people was well-defined and this can be seen in the clothing worn. Scholars know of around twenty specific outfits that the high-level aristocratic people of the Empire would be allowed to wear in addition to the other twenty outfit types that are shown for the lower-level elites. The elites of the empire wore fibers such as linen as compared to the wool of the common people, this linen allowed for greater comfort in warmer weather. For colder weather that would be experienced, the linen fibers were intertwined with other multi-colored threads that also helped show the wealth acquired by these elite individuals.

As well as social status is shown by the type of fibers used for the clothing worn by the elite, the inclusion of other luxurious goods within the clothing was used as well. Items such as turquoise, jade, gold, feathers, and shells were intertwined within the fibers of the clothing to showcase the luxuries that the individual was able to obtain as well as show the power that they had.

Specifically seen more in the clothing worn by the elite, a hip cloth, called xiuht- lulpill, was among the most highly worn and prestigious pieces of clothing for the elite. This particular hip cloth also included turquoise which relates to the overall importance and esteem that came with these garments.

The dress for Aztec royalty also varied from the dress for the elites. According to scholar Patricia Rieff Anawalt, the clothing worn by the Aztec royalty was the most lavish of all the garments worn by the Aztec people. Their elaborate dress was also worn in combination with embellishments of jewelry, particularly in ceremonial occasions. One of the primary distinctions would be the fact that their clothing features aspects such as insignias as well as displaying even more of the turquoise material. In peacetime, the Aztec emperor would wear a unique garment that consisted of a blue and white mantle that included the royal insignia.

== Hairstyles ==
Different hairstyles worn by Aztec people also strictly follow the sumptuary laws. Aztec women wore hair in two braids that projected in the front like horns and this hairstyle was called neaxtlāhualli [neɑʃtɬɑːˈwɑɬːi]. Women sometimes create a purple highlight in their hair with an herb called xiuhquílitl, and sometimes they shave their hair completely. Young boys before the age of 10 are required to shave their head, and by the age of 10 they are allowed to grow their hair on the back of their head. Men commonly kept their hair cut to neck length, sometimes with a fringe. High-ranking warriors would wear their hair in a style called temillotl, which translates into "Column of Stone".

== Jewelry ==
Types of Aztec Earplugs Nacochtli [naˈkot͡ʃt͡ɬi]
E	N	IPA	English	Nahuatl	Notes
gold	teōcuitlatl	[teoːˈkʷit͡ɬat͡ɬ]	golden earplugs	teocuitlanacochtli	especially prestigious
	teōxihuitl	[teoːˈʃiwit͡ɬ]	turquoise earplugs	xiuhnacochtli	especially prestigious
June Beetle	mayātl	[ˈmajaːt͡ɬ]	green June Beetle earplugs	mayananacochtli	
obsidian	ītztli	[ˈiːt͡st͡ɬi]	obsidian earplugs	itznacochtli	more common, less prestigious
leather	cuetlaxtli	[kʷeˈt͡ɬaʃt͡ɬi]	leather earplugs	cuetlaxnacochtli	awarded to warriors of higher ranks
quetzal	quetzalli	[keˈt͡salːi]	curved green ear pendants with bells	quetzalcoyolnacochtli	given to merchants who participated in a conquest
reed	ācatl	[ˈaːkat͡ɬ]	reed earplugs	acanacochtli	
mud	zoquitl	[ˈsokit͡ɬ]	pottery earplugs	zoquinacochtli	
mirror	tēzcatl	[ˈteːskat͡ɬ]	mirror-stone earplugs	tezcanacochtli	
workable metal	tepoztli	[teˈpost͡ɬi]	copper earplugs	tepoznacochtli	
crystal	tehuīlōtl	[teˈwiːloːt͡ɬ]	crystal earplugs	tehuilonacochtli	
wood	cuahuitl	[ˈkʷawit͡ɬ]	wooden earplugs	cuauhnacochtli	
amber	apozonalli	[aposoˈnalːi]	amber earplugs	apozonalnacochtli	

The Aztec (women and men) would tend to always decorate themselves with gold bangles, necklaces, chokers, etc. Such jewelry was worn to show how wealthy one was; lower class Aztec would tend to wear less jewelry than an Aztec of higher placing and wealth.

The jewelry worn by the Aztec people was rich in variety. Aztecs perfected metalworking to a great art. Gold and silver jewelry was worn alongside ornaments made of feathers, shells, leather, and stones. Among the Aztecs, laws about which ornaments could be worn were strictly enforced. Only royalty could wear headdresses with gold and quetzal (a bird with brilliant blue-green feathers that reach three feet in length) feathers, for example.

== Battle regalia ==
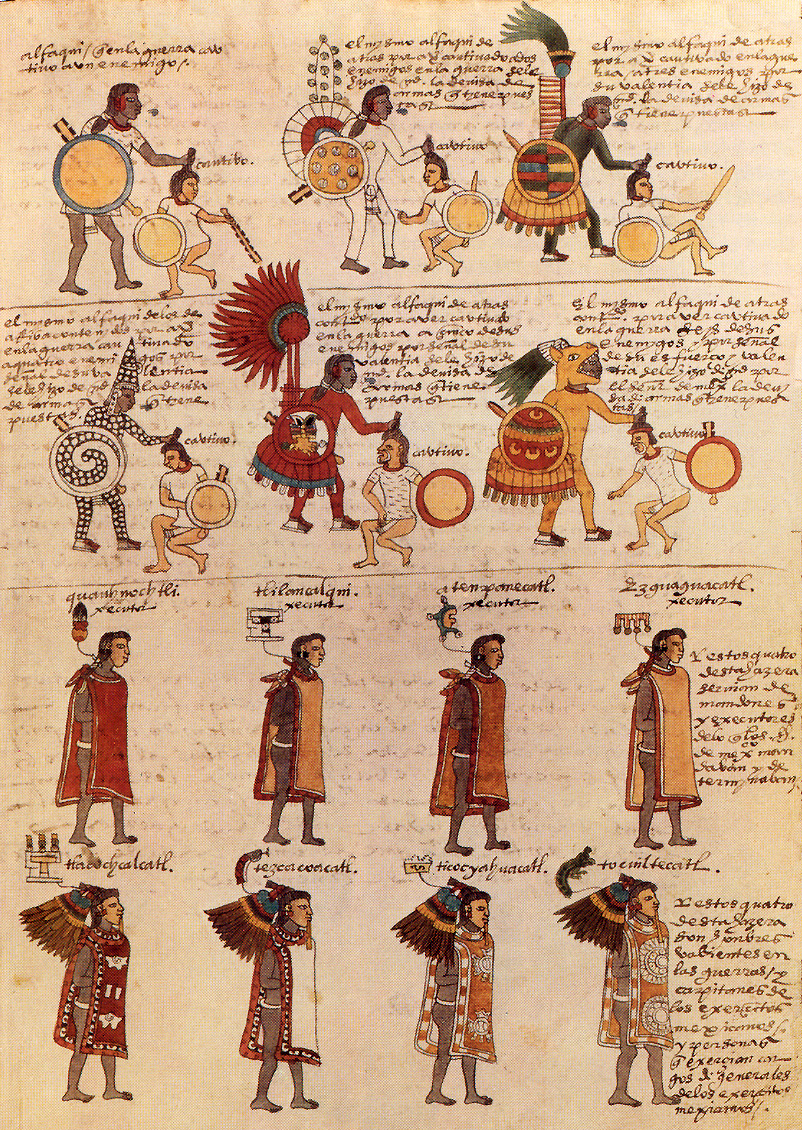
Aztec warriors and priests as depicted in the Codex Mendoza, wearing battle suits and tilmahtli tunics.

All warriors wore loincloths, and basic military armor called ichcahuipilli. When they were recognized by the state for their bravery in battle, their status increased (regardless of original class) and they were rewarded with shell and glass beaded jewelry. If the warrior was more honored or a higher rank, they would wear battle suits called Tlahuiztli; these suits were distinctively decorated for prestigious warriors and members of warrior societies. They served as a way to identify warriors according to their achievements in battle as well as rank, alliance, and social status like priesthood or nobility.

The ranking and status of the Aztec warriors were influenced by how many captives or prisoners the individual warrior had taken, the higher the number the more decorated their dress would be. Usually made to work as a single piece of clothing with an opening in the back, they covered the entire torso and most of the extremities of a warrior, and offered added protection to the wearer. The tlahuiztli was made with elements of animal hide, leather, and cotton. There is a lack of information known to scholars about the particulars of the cotton armor, although reported by scholar Frances F. Berdan these quilted cotton armor may have been carried and sold on the battlefield.

Covered in feathers, the garment called Ehuatl was a closed sewn garment that would be used in signify the rank of the warriors in a specific cadre of warriors. In addition to the fiber worn, warriors were also allowed to wear sandals as they progressed through the ranks. Additionally, some of these customs would include headdresses. These headdresses often resemble a coyote, jaguar, or frightful specter.

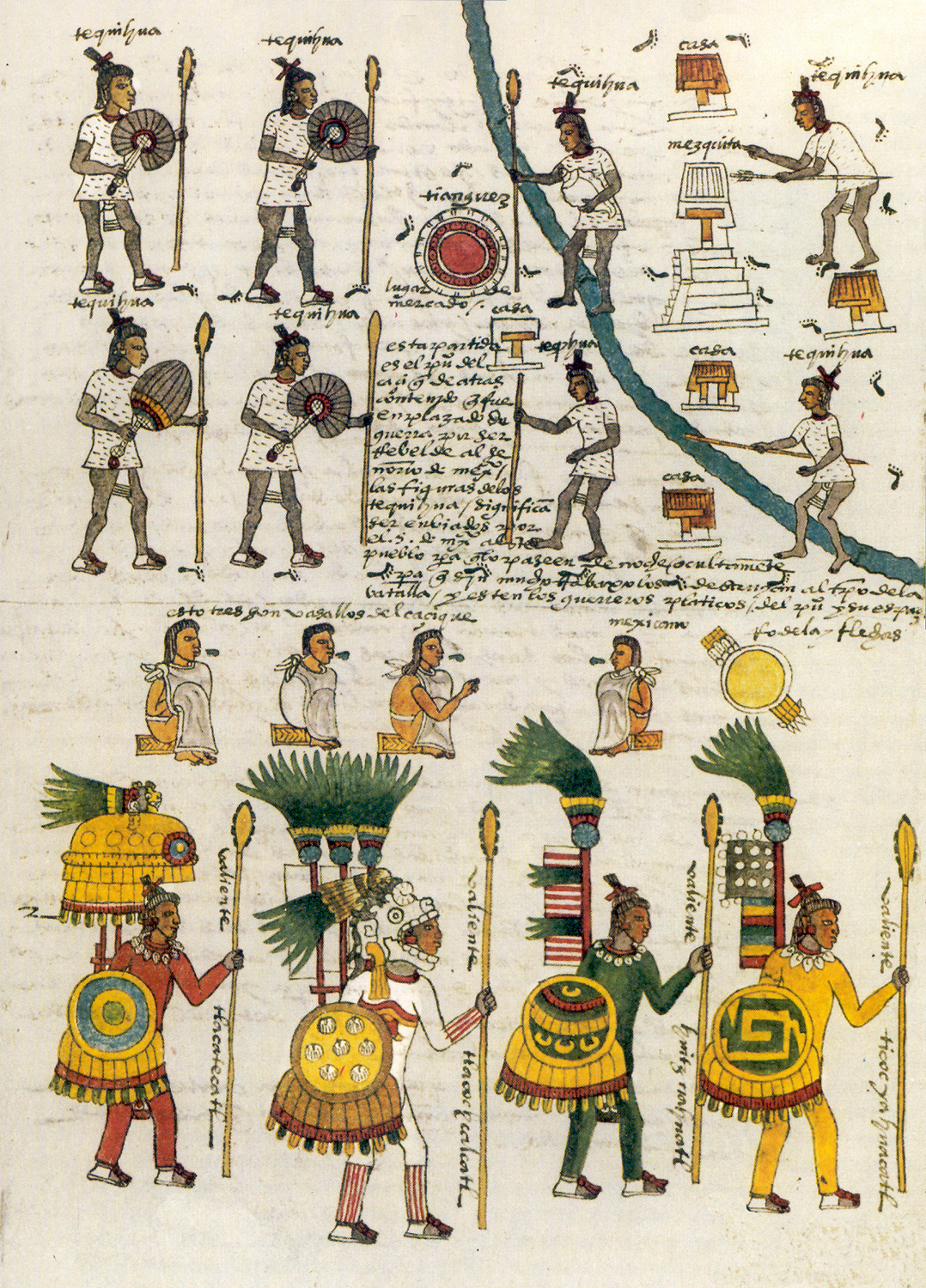
Page from the Codex Mendoza depicting warriors wearing ichcahuipilli armor and Tlahuiztli suits.

== See also ==
- Aztec
- Indigenous peoples of the Americas
