= Global art =

Term for contemporary art produced after 1989

Global art is terminology used to identify contemporary art produced after 1989. It was introduced to distinguish it from the term world art, which tends to refer to historical ethnographic objects in a museum.
