= Xicalcoliuhqui =

Stepped fret motif in Mesoamerican art

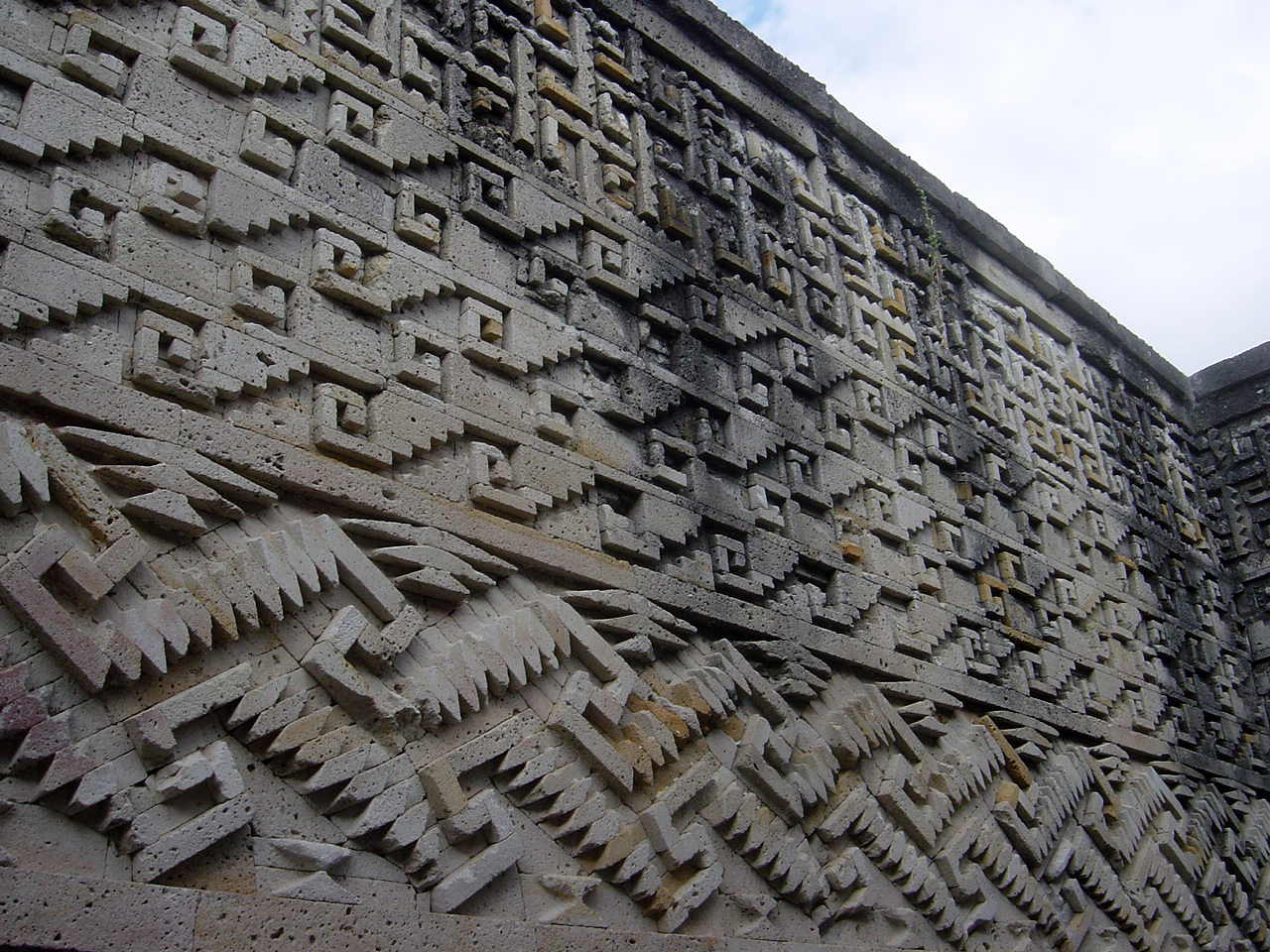
Variations on the xicalcoliuhqui or "step-fret" motif in the mosaics at Mitla.

Xicalcoliuhqui (also referred to as a "step fret" or "stepped fret" design and greca in Spanish) is a common motif in Mesoamerican art. It is composed of three or more steps connected to a hook or spiral, reminiscent of a "greek-key" meander. Pre-Columbian examples may be found on everything from jewelry, masks, ceramics, sculpture, textiles and featherwork to painted murals, codices and architectural elements of buildings. The motif has been in continual use from the pre-Columbian era to the present.

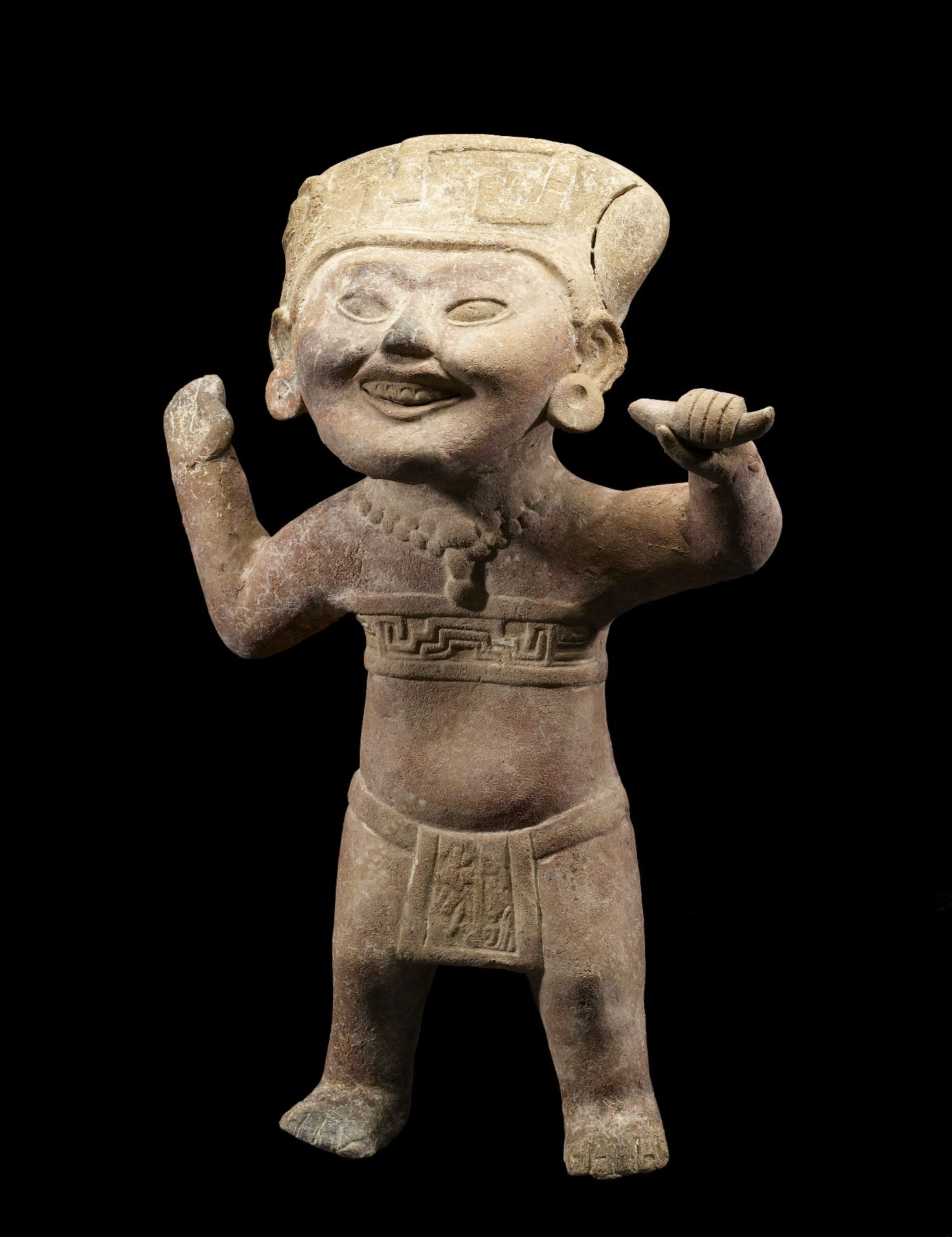
The xicalcoliuhqui motif can be seen in both the pectoral band and headdress of this statue of a performer from Veracruz.

== Connotations ==
The word xicalcoliuhqui (Nahuatl pronunciation: [ʃikaɬkoˈliʍki]) means "twisted gourd" (xical- "gourdbowl" and coliuhqui "twisted") in Nahuatl. The motif is associated with many ideas, and is variously thought to depict water, waves, clouds, lightning, a serpent or serpent-deity like the mythological fire or feathered serpents, as well as more philosophical ideas like cyclical movement, or the life-giving connection between the light of the sun and the earth, and it may have been a protection against death, but no single meaning is universally accepted. It is also possible that the motif represents the cut conch shell which is an emblem of Ehecatl, the wind god, an aspect of Quetzalcoatl. It seems likely that the multivalent nature of the symbol gave rise to its potency and longevity.

== Xicalcoliuhqui chimalli, the stepped-fret shield ==
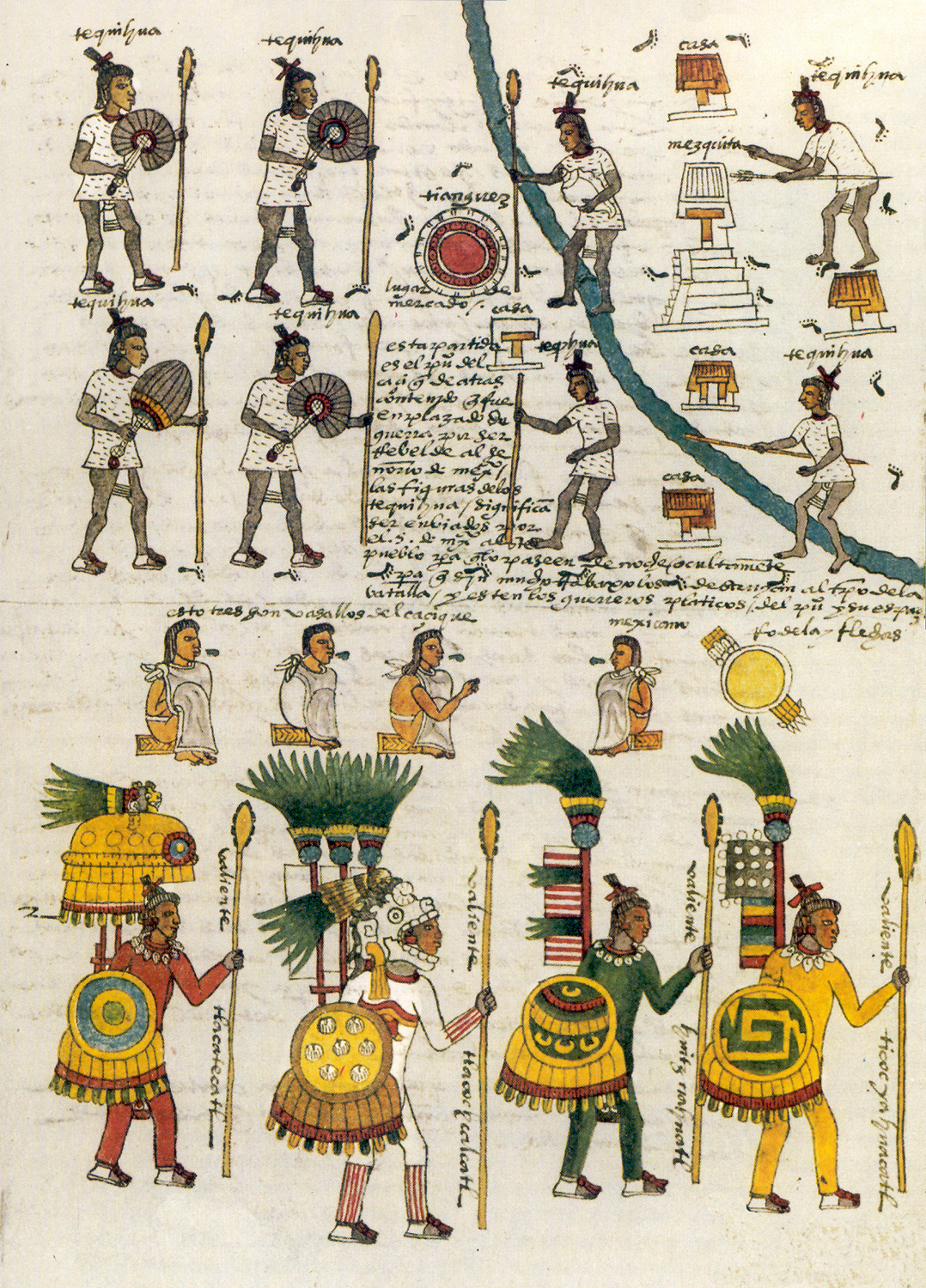
Codex Mendoza Folio 67 recto. The warrior on the bottom right carries a xicalcoliuhqui chimalli, a stepped-fret shield.

Xicalcoliuhqui chimalli, are shields featuring a single iteration of the stepped fret motif which were painted or covered with featherwork. They are depicted frequently in the Codex Mendoza, and many other central Mexican codices, usually with the xicalcoliuhqui design shown in yellow and green.

== Architectural embellishments ==
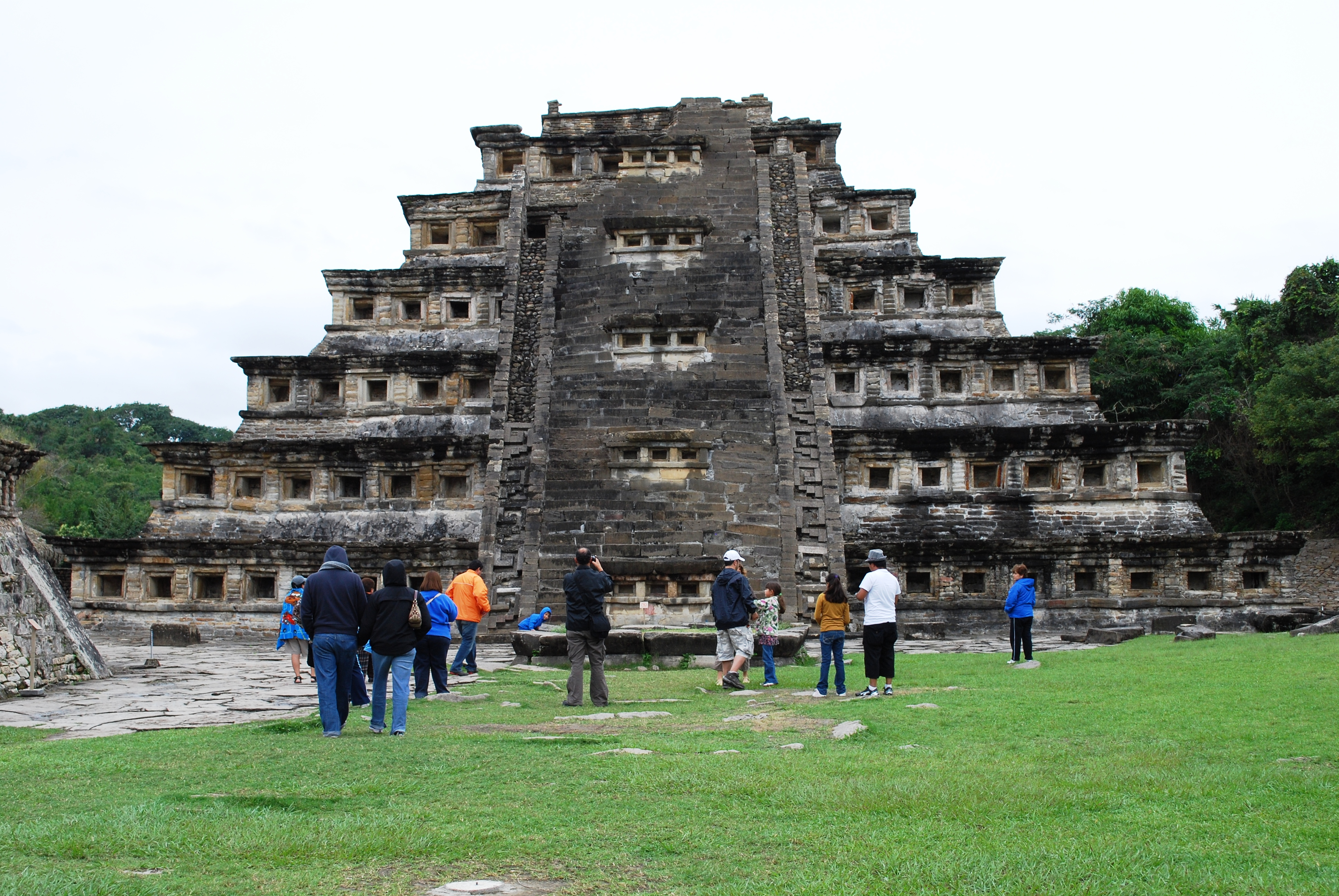
The Pyramid of Niches at El Tajín. The xicalcoliuhqui motif can be found on either side of the lower portion of the stairs.

The xicalcoliuhqui motif appears in embellishments on temples and other buildings at archaeological sites around Mexico.

- The xicalcoliuhqui motif is featured on either side of the staircase on The Pyramid of the Niches at the Veracruz site of El Tajín.
- The stone mosaic fretwork at Mitla, a Zapotec site in Oaxaca, display many variations on the xicalcoliuhqui motif.

== Gallery ==
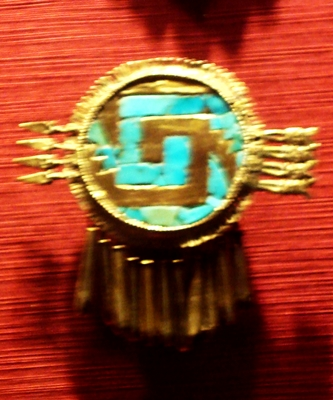
A miniature xicalcoliuhqui chimalli, or step-fret shield from Yanhuitlan, Oaxaca.

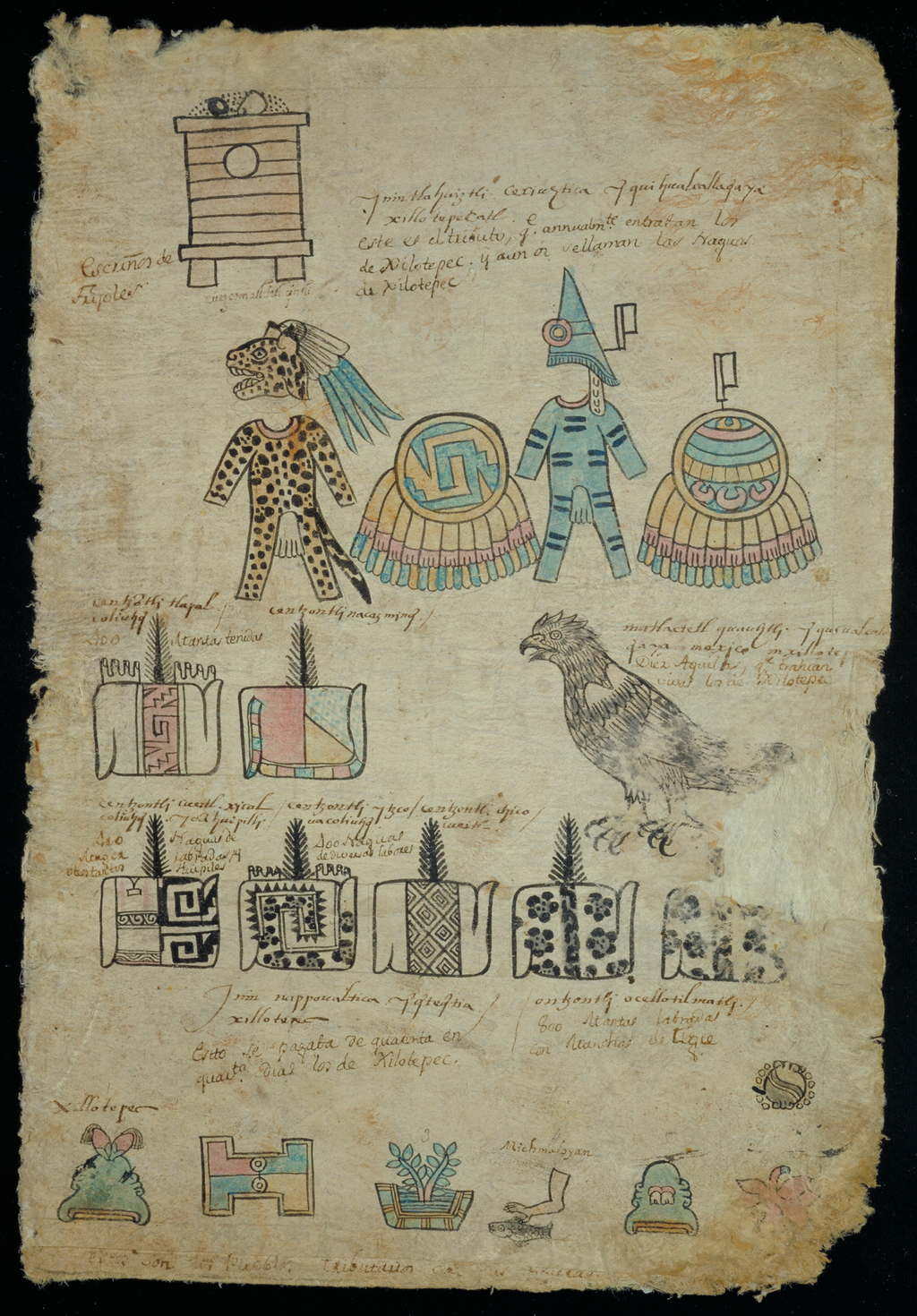
This page from the Matrícula de tributos shows the xicalcoliuhqui motif in three places, on the xicalcoliuhqui chimalli, the shield to the right of the jaguar-warrior costume, as well as on the two bundles on the left side of the page.

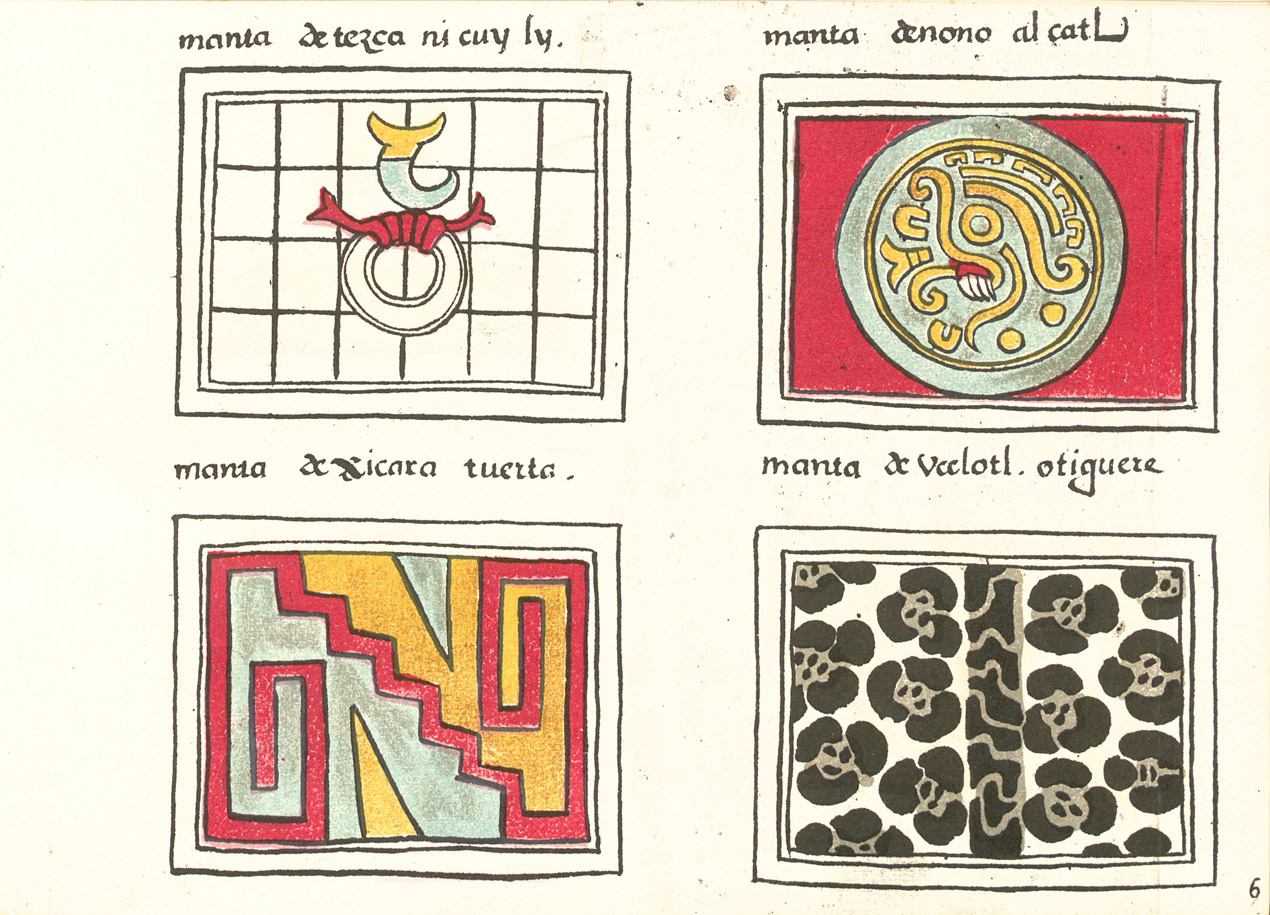
An example of xicalcoliuhqui motif on the bottom left from the Codex Magliabechiano, folio 6r.

A Xicalcoliuhqui Chimalli
