= Slavery in the Aztec Empire =

Slavery in the Aztec Empire and surrounding Mexica societies was widespread, with slaves known by the Nahuatl word, tlacotli. Slaves did not inherit their status; people were enslaved as a form of punishment, after being captured in war, or voluntarily to pay off debts. Within Mexica society, slaves constituted an important class.

== Description ==
Slavery was not a station one was born into, but a state entered into as a form of punishment, out of financial desperation, or as a captive. The practice consisted of two systems:

- Slavery, in the strictest sense of the term
- indentured servitude.

=== Aztecs as slave owners ===
Slave owners were required to provide food, water, and shelter for their slaves.

Women slave owners exerted much in the way of choice, regarding slaves. For example, if a woman was widowed, it was not uncommon for her to either remarry one of her husband's slaves or make one of his slaves her steward. The richest merchants in Mexica society were slave traders. Not only were they wealthy, but they were also granted special privileges. They were also considered to be very religious, and played a key role in the festival of Panquetzaliztli in respect of the Mexica god, Huitzilopochtli.

Any person not related to a slave's master could be enslaved for trying to prevent a slave's escape. If one slave would not behave according to the slave master's will, he could be sentenced to death.

=== Slaves in the Aztec society ===
While slavery could not be inherited, in Mexica society, one could live indefinitely as a slave. For example, Moctezuma II, in addition to confiscating property, would condemn traitors, or their families, to slavery for life. He would also do the same to astrologers who failed to predict the occurrence of omens.

Slaves were bound to their master's lands until their debt was paid to their master. Barring being a captive, being punished for committing a crime, or failing to pay an outstanding gambling debt, slavery was an institution one could enter into freely. In that respect, the system was not slavery, but contractual indentured servitude, resulting in "unfree" labor. However, it was such a widely held practice that the Mexica would often sell their children into slavery.

Slaves wore maguey garments called "cueitl," which was a skirt that wrapped around the hips, one end overlapping the other, held together by a belt-like strap. Reflecting their low status in society, the create of slaves was colorless. Typically, upon the death of their owner, slaves who had performed outstanding services were freed, while the rest were passed on as part of the inheritance. As for assigned work, many slaves were sent to the regions of Cimatan and the Acalan, aquatic environments, to work as rowers and as laborers in the cacao groves, which was work that needed to be done year-round.

Beyond their labor, slaves were free; they could marry and own their property including other slaves. They were also expected to contribute to the betterment of Mexica society. For example, slaves helped move the military's equipment when it set off for battle. When slaves had children, the children were not passed down to the master of the slaves but were set free to live their own lives.

==== Use of slaves by various social classes ====
Slaves could be used for any sort of work, but in practice, most slaves found themselves as servants in the palaces of lords. When noblemen died, they were cremated with forty slaves—20 women and 20 men.

Aztec society consisted of a strict social class structure and every individual had their place in society, although social class was not set in stone; rather, there was room for maneuvering. Aztec slaves were a vehicle for moving around the societal hierarchy. José Luis de Rojas, the author of Tenochtitlan: Capital of the Aztec Empire, states that one of the most respected positions an Aztec commoner could obtain was the role of “tealtiani" or the person responsible for the cleansing of slaves before sacrifice.

==== Slavery of war captives ====
Slavery was most difficult for war captives who, after being captured, could be sold. They could also be sacrificed at a religious ceremony or festival. For example, slaves were selected to be ixiptla, which is a representation of a god. They believed that the god would, in turn, represent a force of celestial nature such as the wind or the moon and that sacrificing the slave would satisfy the god, who would then bring good fortune to the people. In the event of a nobleman's death, slaves could be killed, and buried with him, to assist him in the underworld as they assisted him in life. The body parts of sacrificed slaves could be taken home and eaten with maize and salt as an extension of their sacrifice.

It was a great honor to be allowed to sacrifice a human in a public setting in the Aztec Empire. The warriors would go out into combat and come back with slaves to sacrifice. However, this was not an option for the elderly and nobles, who would instead purchase slaves. Citizens would also buy slaves that held similar occupations as themselves for sacrifice.

==== Emancipation ====
A way for slaves to get their freedom was by running outside the walls of the marketplace and stepping on a piece of human excrement, then presenting their case to the judges, asking for freedom. If granted freedom, the slaves would be washed, given new clothes (not owned by the master), and declared free.

== Aztec slave trade ==
Slaves were also frequent faces in the market of Tenochtitlan where just like food, cloth, and handmade goods had their own section, there was a section of slaves for sale. However, the cities with the most well-known slave markets were Azcapotzalco and Itzocan.

Usually, only wealthy men, or nobles, could often afford slaves. Slaves could be bought for 30 cotton garments called "quaintly." Slaves who could entertain their masters with talent, such as by singing or dancing, were more expensive and could cost upwards of 25 percent more.

Slaves that possessed different skills were valued at different prices. According to José Luis de Rojas the author of Tenochtitlan: Capital of the Aztec Empire, slaves that could dance would be worth around 40 pieces of cotton cloth. At the same time, different skills like weaving were valued differently. Luis also writes about how slaves could also be purchased with Cacao beans, the average slave was worth 3000-4000 beans.

=== Collared slaves ===
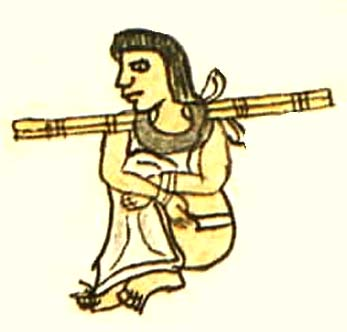
Wooden collar

Orozco y Berra reports that a master could not sell a slave without the slave's consent unless the slave had been classified as incorrigible by an authority. Incorrigibility could be determined based on repeated laziness, attempts to run away, or general bad conduct. Incorrigible slaves were made to wear a wooden collar, affixed by rings at the back. The collar was not merely a symbol of bad conduct: it was designed to make it harder to run away through a crowd or narrow spaces.

According to Dr Michael Smith, slaves for sale in the market, all were identified by their large wooden collars.

When buying a collared slave, one was informed of how many times that slave had been sold. A slave who was sold three times as incorrigible could be sold to be sacrificed; those slaves commanded a premium in price. However, if a collared slave managed to present him- or herself in the royal palace or a temple, he or she would regain liberty.

== Voluntary slavery ==
Some slaves gave up their freedom to pay off gambling debts. However, becoming a slave was a process. First, the gambler had to stand before four respected elders. They would then conduct a ceremony whereby the gambler would prefer his want (or need) to become a slave and be given, by his new owner, the price of his freedom, which was often 20 pieces of cloth and the means to live alone for a year before he began his slavery. After the gambler spent that amount, his service would be exchanged for food, shelter and clothing. Anyone could be a slave, though commoners were more likely to enter slavery voluntarily. But, because slaves were looked down upon, it was usually the last option one took to pay off a debt. Besides gamblers, selling oneself into slavery was often a fate for ageing courtesans or prostitutes, known among the Mexica as "tahini". Beyond paying off debts people may have become slaves to better support themselves in times of economic crisis. During a Famine in the 1450s, many Aztecs sold themselves into slavery in the Gulf Coast where economic prospects were better.

== Superstitions and slavery ==
It was believed that those who were born in the 13-day series that started with 1 Ocelotl were destined to be slaves, or that their lives would be burdened with something else undesirable.
