= Huipil =

Traditional Mexican and Central American women's garment

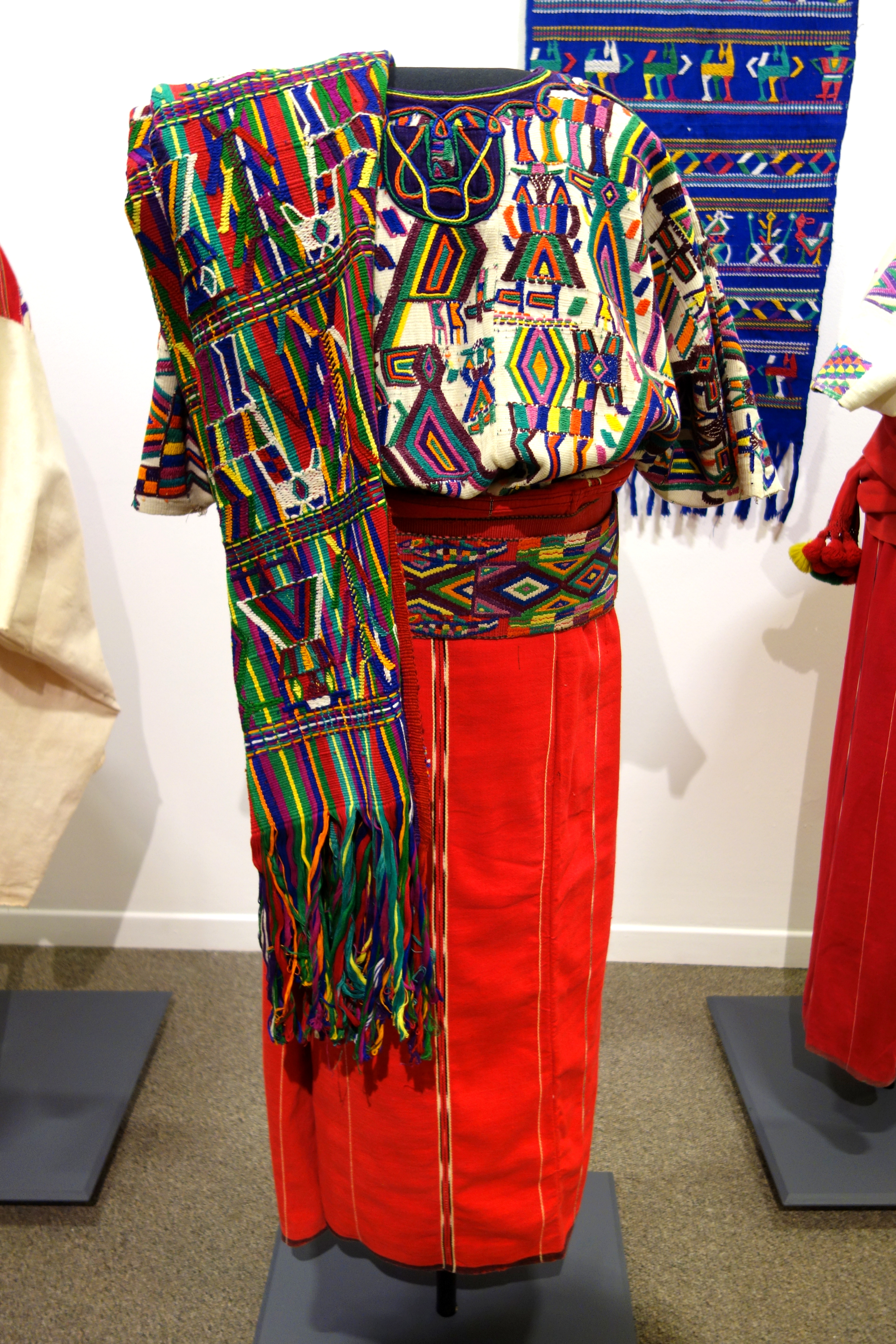
1950s huipil

Huipil [ˈwipil] (Nahuatl: huīpīlli [wiːˈpiːlːi]) is the most common traditional garment worn by indigenous women from central Mexico to Central America.

It is a loose-fitting tunic, generally made from two or three rectangular pieces of fabric, which are then joined with stitching, ribbons, or fabric strips, with an opening for the head and, if the sides are sewn, openings for the arms. Traditional huipils, especially ceremonial ones, are usually made with fabric woven on a backstrap loom and are decorated with designs woven into the fabric, embroidery, ribbons, lace, and more. However, some huipils are also made from commercial fabric.

A huipil can vary in length from a short blouse to a garment long enough to reach the floor. The style of traditional huipils generally indicates the ethnicity and community of the wearer as each has its own methods of creating the fabric and decorations. Ceremonial huipils are suitable for weddings, burials, women of high rank and even to dress the statues of saints.

The huipil has been worn by indigenous women in Mesoamerica of both high and low social rank since well before the Spanish invasion. A characteristic item of Aztec clothing, it remains the most common female indigenous garment still in use. It is most often seen in the Mexican states of Chiapas, Yucatán, Quintana Roo, Oaxaca, Tabasco, Campeche, Hidalgo, Michoacán (where it is called a huanengo), Veracruz and Morelos. In Central America it is most often used among the Mayans in Guatemala.

Cuetzalan, Puebla has an annual coffee and huipil festival called Feria del Huipil y Café, which began in 1949.

== Names ==
Alternative names for the huipil include:

- Chortí: b’ujk
- Chuj: nip
- Mixtec: xighu/dzico

== History ==
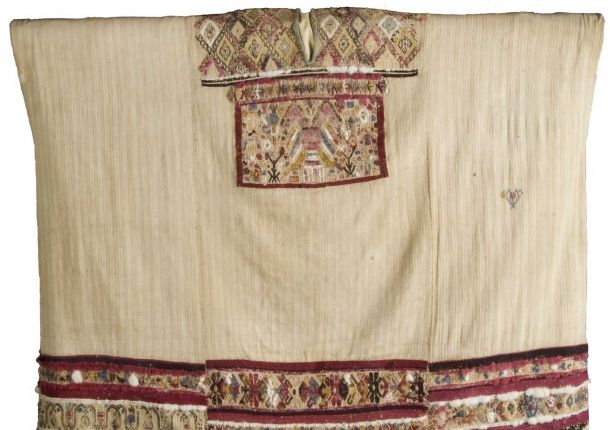
The "La Malinche" huipil

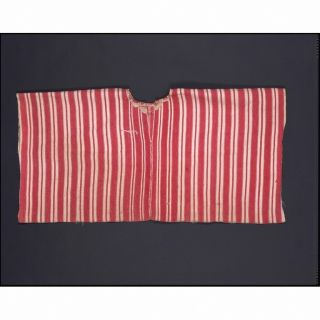
Huipil, 1875–1890, Warp-faced plain weave cotton, Patzun, Guatemala (probably) V&A Museum no.T.23-1931

After the Spanish conquest of the Aztec Empire and subsequent Spanish expansion, the huipil endured but it evolved, incorporating elements from other regions and Europe. One of the oldest known huipils in existence is the "La Malinche", named such because it was believed to have been worn by La Malinche, Hernán Cortés’ interpreter as it looks much like ones in depictions of her in the Lienzo de Tlaxcala and the Florentine Codex. However, carbon-14 tests date it to the 18th century. It is exceptional not only for its age but there is none like it in any collection and it is larger than usual at 120 by 140 centimetres (47 in × 55 in). It is made of cotton with feathers, wax and gold thread. The design is dominated by an image of a double headed eagle, showing both indigenous and Spanish influence. It is part of the collection of the National Museum of Anthropology.

Some huipils, such as those from the Isthmus of Tehuantepec show Asian influence due to cloth brought from the Philippines. In addition, the huipil began to be worn with other garments, especially European skirts, during the colonial period. This led to changes in the garment itself and how it was used. In some cases, the huipil became shorter, to function as a kind of blouse rather than a dress. In the same region, the huipil also evolved into a long flowing and sometimes voluminous head covering which frames the face.

To this day, the most traditional huipils are made with handwoven cloth on a backstrap loom. However, the introduction of commercial fabric made this costly, and many indigenous women stopped making this fabric or making simpler versions. By the early 1800s, women began to wear undecorated huipils or European style blouses. By the end of the 19th century, most Maya women had forgotten the technique of brocade weaving entirely.

The huipil endures in many indigenous communities, if not as an everyday garment, as one for ceremonies or special occasions. When a woman puts on a huipil, especially a ceremonial or very traditional one, it is a kind of ritual. She becomes the center of a symbolic world as her head passes through the neck opening. With her arms, she forms a cross and is surrounded by myth as between heaven and the underworld.

== Description ==
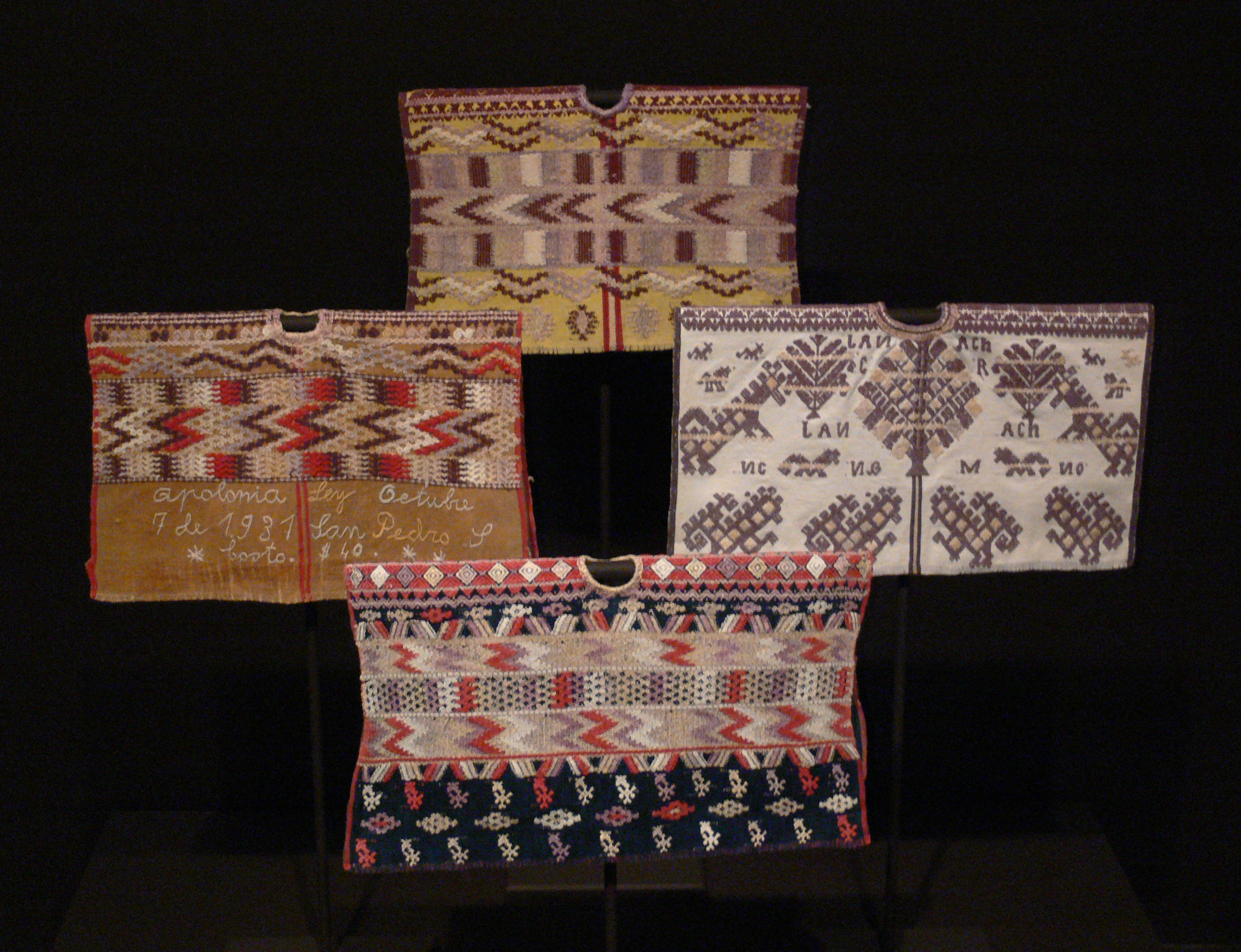
Four huipils for a figure of the Virgin of the Rosary; Guatemala, Guatemala, San Juan Sacatepequez; Kakchiquel Maya people; 1930s; cotton and silk (Dallas Museum of Art)

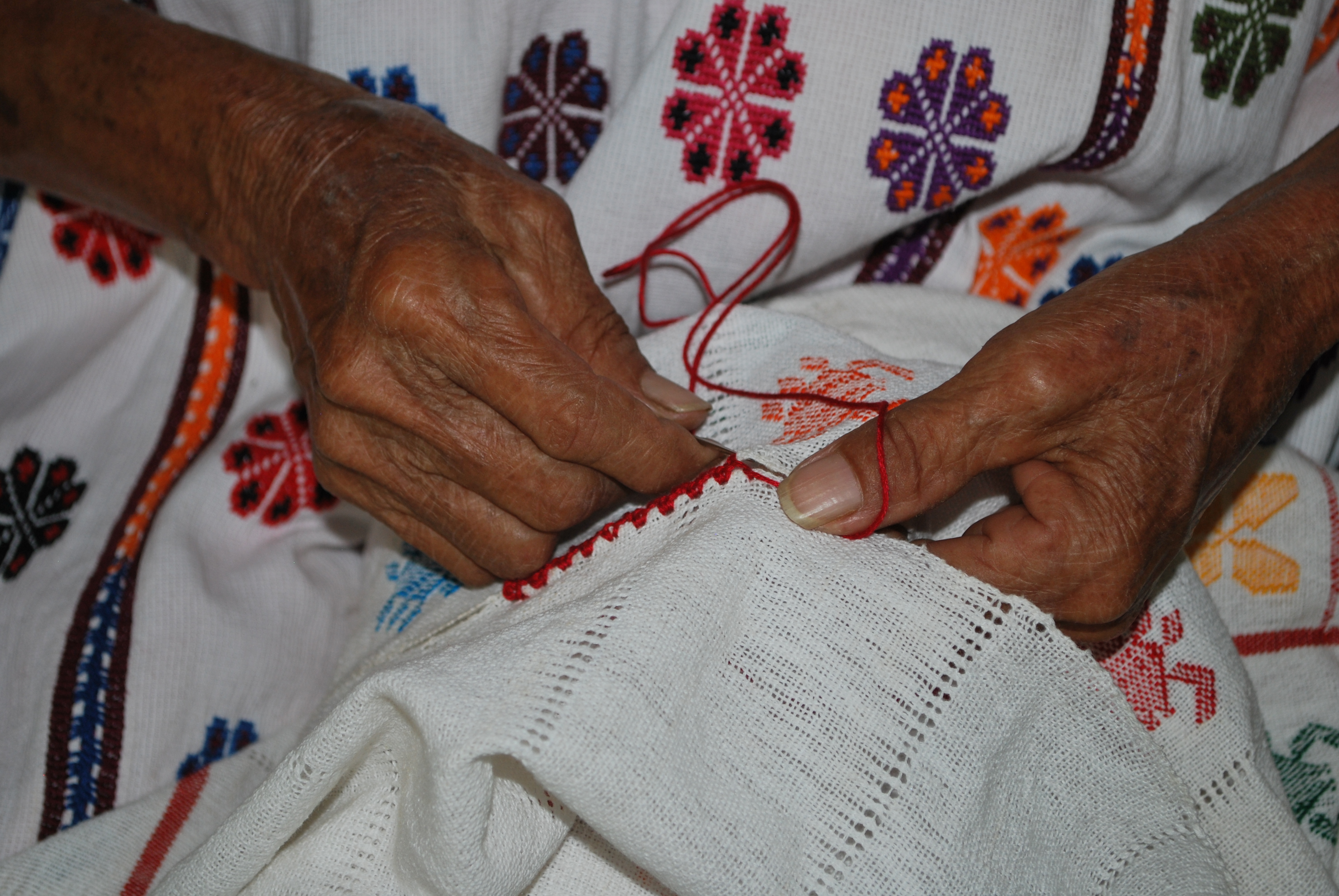
Stitching together two panels in Xochistlahuaca

The huipil is a tunic-like garment made by stitching together anywhere from one to five pieces of cloth. The most common fiber is cotton, but there are those made from wool and silk as well. Most huipils are made from two or three pieces, which are usually the same size, with one exception being those from the highlands of Chiapas, where the center piece is wider than the side ones. The panels are not sewn together in the normal sense with seams but rather they are joined using ribbons, small strips of cloth or complicated stitching which has the edges of the panels touching or almost touching. This adds a layer of decoration to the garment.

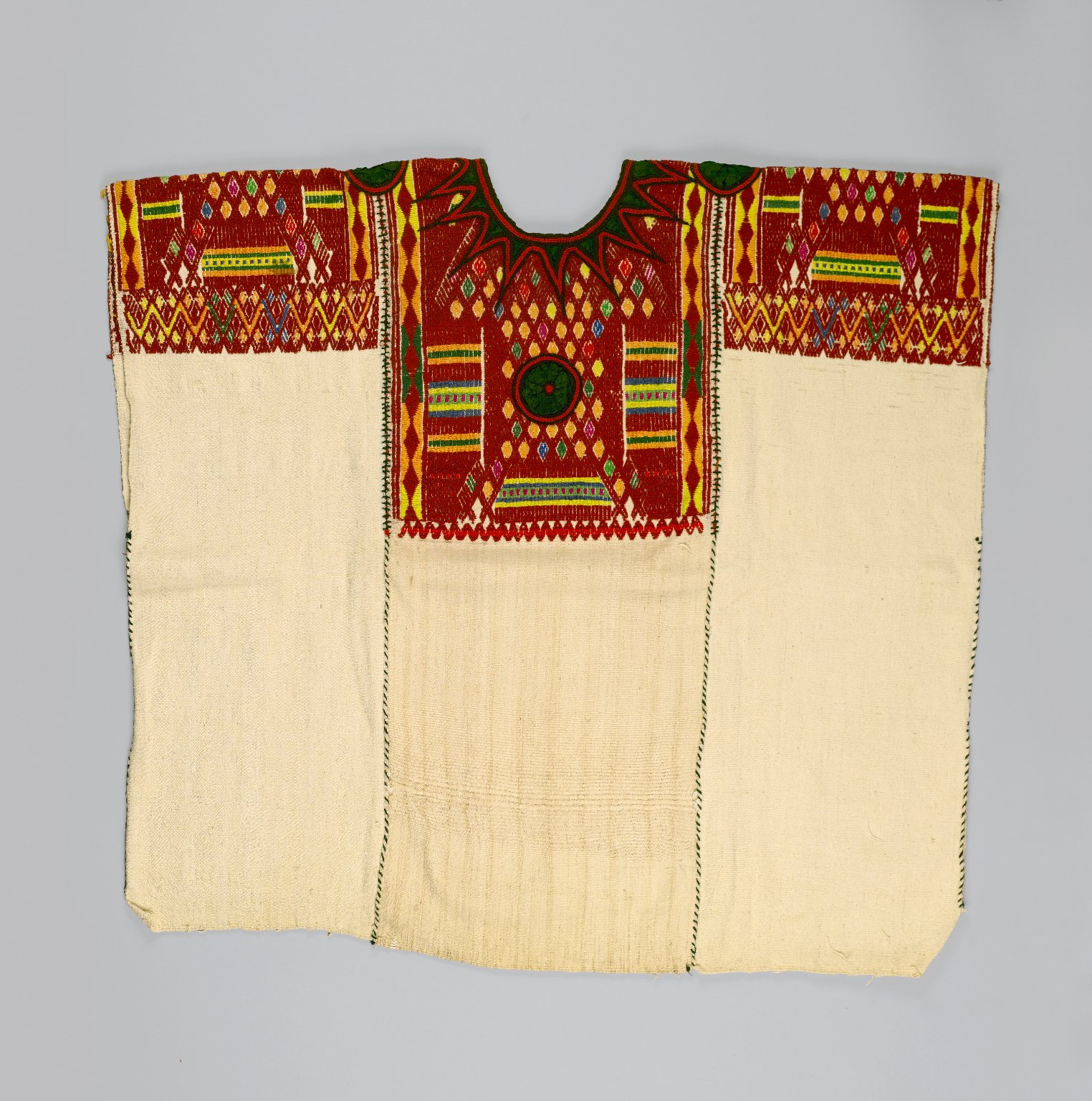
Maya. Woman's Blouse or Huipil, Brooklyn Museum

Most classic huipils are wider than they are long although there has been a reduction in width in recent years. Huipils can be as short as waist length or can reach to the ankles or anywhere in between, but most fall just above or just below the knee. Long or short, it is not designed to be a close-fitting garment. The neckline can be round, oval, square or a simple slit. Most are sewn on the sides, leaving an opening in the upper part for the arms to pass through. Some huipils are not sewn on the sides, especially the very short ones. While huipils today are made from commercial cloth, the most traditional are made from hand woven fabric made on a backstrap loom. The pieces to be used to make the huipil are woven to size and are never cut. Despite its simplicity, the backstrap loom permits more types of techniques and designs to be woven into the cloth than other types of looms. Most of the hand woven fabric have designs woven into them, especially cloth destined for ceremonial huipils. The decorative elements can signify history, cultural identity, something personal about the wearer and more. Since most indigenous come from agricultural societies, clothing designs generally relate to the natural world. The most complicated designs are generally known only to a few older master weavers. In addition to designs embedded into the fabric, other decorative elements can include embroidery, ribbon, feathers, lace and more.

The making of traditional huipils is an important cultural and economic activity for the Amuzgos, especially in Xochistlahuaca where most people still wear traditional clothing. Girls begin learning the craft when they are young, learning techniques and designs from their mothers and grandmothers. The weaving is an important source of income as agriculture is not enough to meet most families’ needs. While they work on other items such as tablecloths and other items of clothing, the most popular and most valued remains the huipil. Amuzgo women have achieved a certain level of fame, with weavers such as Florentina López de Jesús winning recognition at the 2001 UNESCO handcraft competition for Latin America and Caribbean.

== Variations in different regions ==
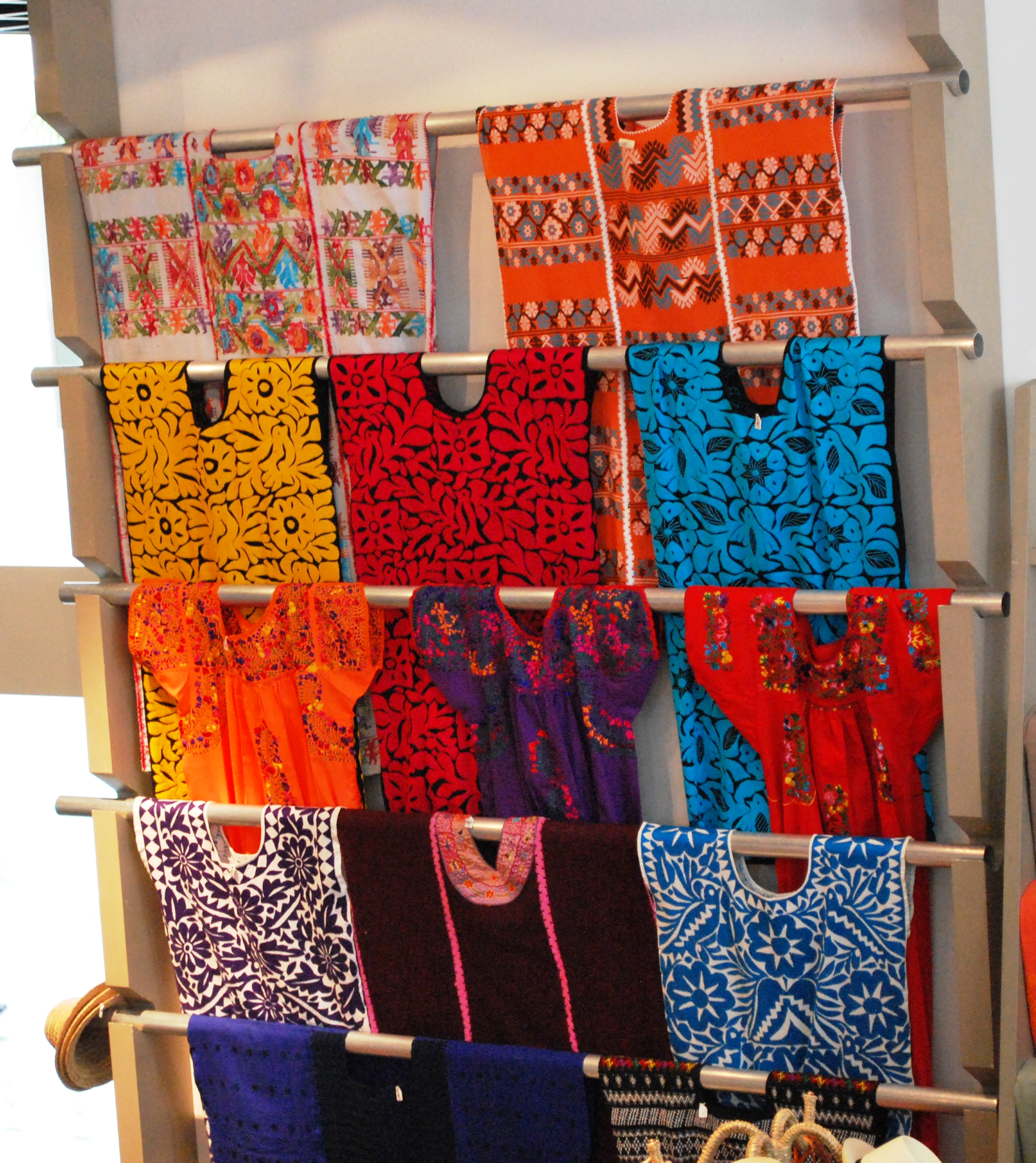
Huipils on sale at the Museo de Arte Popular in Mexico City

Traditional huipils generally identify the indigenous group and a community of the wearer as each has its own designs for both weaving and embroidering. Some communities, such as Jamiltepec in Oaxaca, have a taboo against huipils made there being worn by women from other areas.

Except for very long huipils, they are generally worn with other items of clothing such as a skirt or slip. Most huipils hang loose but some can be tied at the waist or can be tucked into a skirt like a blouse. In some cases, such as in San Juan Copala, Oaxaca, the extra length of the huipil is rolled up onto the waist when worn with a skirt.

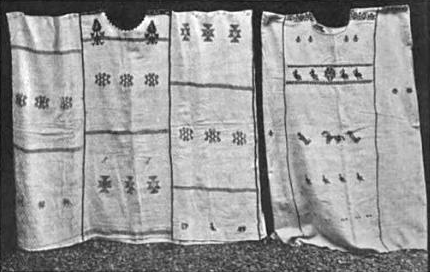
Huipils of the Tlapanec people c. 1908

Women commonly have an everyday huipil and those worn only on special occasions such as weddings. Decorative elements are often arranged in horizontal bands but those with vertical orientation are found as well. In a number of indigenous communities, extravagant huipils made for a woman's wedding is then carefully put away and stored to be used later for her funeral. In others, a special huipil is begun when a woman reaches a certain age for this purpose. Ceremonial huipils are also made to dress images of saints. During festivals, these saints can be dressed in many layers of huipils, giving them a fattened appearance.

The garment is common among the various Mayan groups. For Mayan women in Guatemala, huipil designs on the front back and shoulders can identify which type of Maya and from what community. Mayan ceremonial huipils are worn only by the statues of saints and the wives of religious officials.

Chinanteca huipils are elaborate with the entire garment covered in woven and embroidered geometric designs in various colors, with the edges further decorated with ribbons. In Ojitlán, Oaxaca, Chinanteca women wear special huipils for their wedding, divided into three classes. The first is called “gala” or “red” which used to be the traditional wedding dress. However, because of its cost, few families can afford it. The second type is called “pavo” which is used for special occasions. It is similar to the first but with a less intense red and with smaller designs. The third type, called “pájaros y palomas” (birds and doves) is the most economical of the three and can be found fairly easily in markets. It is white with figures of birds and other animals in vivid and contrasting colors. This used to be reserved for women of middle age or older but it has since been adopted by many.

The indigenous women of the Isthmus of Tehuantepec are known for wearing two huipils. The first is a short velvet huipil which is heavily embroidered with floral motifs and a second one for special occasions, usually white, which frames the face then extends over the head covering the neck and shoulders. The blouse huipil has a length of only about 60 cm and shows modern, European and even Asian influence and is generally worn with a voluminous European style skirt which is also heavily decorated. The head covering is called a “huipil de tapar” (covering huipil) or a bidaniro.

The huipils of Santa María Magdalena, Chiapas are rich in symbolism with images of gods, flowers, frogs and other images with mythological importance. It also includes a set of symbols which serve as a kind of signature of the weaver. The ceremonial huipil of Magdalenas has designs that represent the universe in the form of a cross with east represented on the right shoulder and west on the left. The south is represented on the chest and north on the back. Upon dressing, the woman becomes the center of the universe. This huipil is used only by women of the highest social rank and it is also used to dress statues of saints.

Amuzgo huipils are made with brocade fabric. Amuzgo huipils have a sophisticated set of designs based on animals, plants, geometric shapes and more. Some of the designs are not obvious, such as the use of two connected triangles to represent butterflies, but all have a particular significance.

The ceremonial huipil of Zinacantán, Chiapas is also distinguished by its manufacture and symbolism. It is made of white cotton with a square neckline or with a vertical opening with a button fastener. The chest area is marked off with a red line inside of which are white chicken feathers delicately fastened with white, blue or green thread. The lower border has fringe made of the same materials and colors. It is the only garment in Mexico which uses the pre Hispanic art of featherwork today. This huipil is often used for weddings as it is believed that it ensures a good marriage. Other white wedding huipils are found in Pinotepa Nacional, Chopan and Cotzocón in Oaxaca. In Pinotepa Nacional, decorative elements include animals, flowers, human figures, fretwork, moons, suns, fish and insects.

The ceremonial huipils of the Tzotzils have maintained aspects of pre Hispanic feather art with white feathers found on the chest and lower hem.

In Ocotepec and Cuquila in Oaxaca, which are high in the Mixtec mountains, huipils are made of wool to combat the cold, with cotton ones usually worn for festive occasions.

Yalaltec huipils in Oaxaca are simple with decoration only on a chest and back panel with various colors and some fringe.

== See also ==
- K’apak, various Mayan clothing
  - Pik, another kind of Mayan women's clothing
  - Wex, or cha’nex, Mayan men's clothing (shorts)
