= Ethnography at the British Museum =

Ethnography at the British Museum describes how ethnography has developed at the British Museum.

== Within the Department of Natural History and Curiosities ==
The ethnographical collection was originally linked to the Department of Natural History and Curiosities. The addition of material gathered by Captain James Cook and his companions between 1767 and 1780, and presented to the British Museum by the Lords Commissioners of the Admiralty, Cook himself and Joseph Banks, were a substantial addition to the material previously collected by Sir Hans Sloane. But much of this collection was dispersed. Some material found its way to Göttingen, where August Ludwig Schlözer was developing his concepts of Völkerkunde and ethnographie. However additional material was transferred from the "artificial curiosities" held by the museum of the Royal Society until 1781. In 1817 this was supplemented by material from West Africa collected by Thomas Edward Bowdich during his 'Mission to Ashantee', in 1825 by Aztec sculptures collected by William Bullock in Mexico and Captain William Edward Parry's Eskimo material from his second Arctic voyage of 1829.

== Within the Department of Antiquities ==
In 1836 the Department of Antiquities was established and the ethnographic collection was transferred there. When Christian Jürgensen Thomsen visited the British Museum in 1843, he did not hide his disappointment: he was unimpressed ‘by the British antiquities everywhere covered in dust and not much esteemed’ and complained that the artefacts were displayed without indication of their provenance. An Ethnological Gallery was opened in 1845. In 1851 there were 3,700 artefacts in the ethnographic collection, displayed in a single gallery. In 1852 this consisted of seventy four cases of material from outside Europe: nine containing Chinese and Indian material, 4 African material, 29 material from the Americas with remaining 32 cases containing material from Oceania and South East Asia. Polynesia alone accounted for 15 cases.

== Within the Department of British and Mediaeval Antiquities ==
In 1866, the Department of British and Medieval Antiquities was formed under the superintendence of Augustus Wollaston Franks, as Keeper. It included the ethnographic collections. Franks maintained the view that the museum's collections "should illustrate the manners and customs of such races as have not been subjected directly to European civilisation, so as to furnish the student with the means of examining the affinities and differences between such races and also to reconstruct some of the last pages of the history of the world". The Handbook of the Ethnographical Collection was published in 1910.

== Department of Ethnography ==
The Department of Ethnography was set up as a separate department in 1946. In 1964 the department received 15,000 items from the Wellcome Foundation, the biggest single acquisition from which they ever benefited.

== Museum of Mankind ==
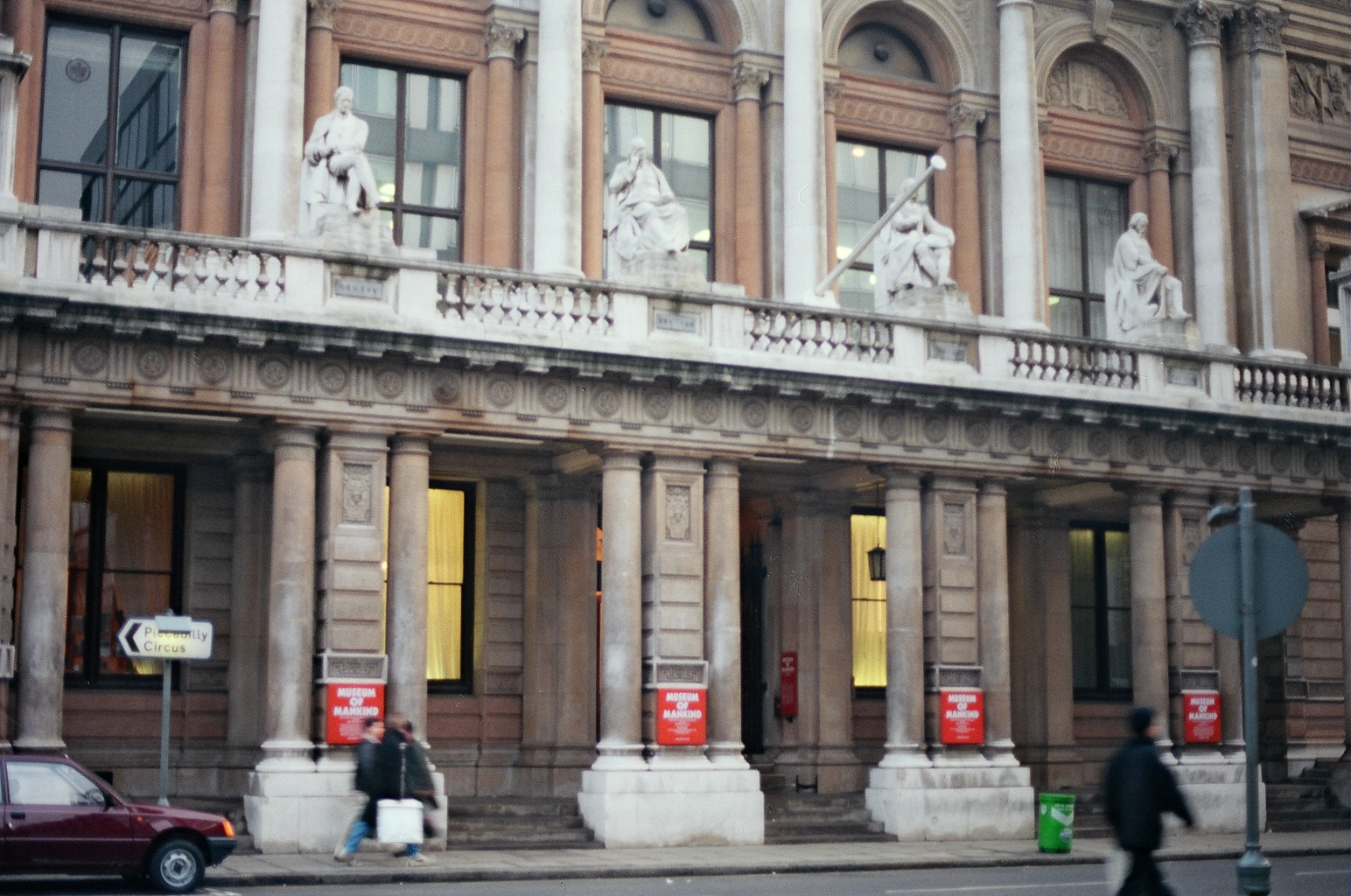
The Museum of Mankind in 1987

From 1970 to 2004 the Department of Ethnography of the British Museum was housed at 6 Burlington Gardens, displaying collections from the Americas, Africa, the Pacific and Australia, as well as tribal Asia and Europe. This was due to lack of space in the museum's main building in Bloomsbury. Between 1970 and 1997, the department was known as the Museum of Mankind. 75 exhibitions were hosted, including many famous ones such as Nomad and City (1976), and Living Arctic (1987). It was created by Keeper of Ethnography Adrian Digby in the 1960s, and opened by his successor William Fagg. Fagg was succeeded by Malcolm McLeod in 1974, and by John Mack in 1990. The museum ceased exhibiting at Burlington Gardens in 1997 and the Department of Ethnography moved back to the British Museum in Bloomsbury in 2004.

=== Exhibitions held at the Museum of Mankind ===
- Manding: Focus on an African Civilisation, 1972
- The Power of the Hand, African arms and armour, 1995

== Notable ethnographers who have worked at the British Museum ==
- Karl Marx who produced his Ethnographic Notebooks was a regular user of the Reading Room when it housed the British Library.
