= Patricia Rieff Anawalt =

American author, editor, and museum director

- Born: March 10, 1924; Ripon, California
- Died: October 2, 2015 (aged 91); Los Angeles, California

Patricia Rieff Anawalt was an American anthropologist, author, and museum director.

Anawalt was born on March 10, 1924, in Ripon, California. She attended the University of California, Los Angeles (UCLA). After she received her PhD she started studying pre-Columbian culture, specifically dress. Anawalt went on to serve as the curator of costumes and textiles at the UCLA Museum of Cultural History. She founded the Center for the Study of Regional Dress at the Fowler Museum at UCLA.

In 1988 she received a Guggenheim Fellowship.

Anawalt wrote several books including The Essential Codex Mendoza (co-authored with Frances Berdan, University of California Press, 1997) and The Worldwide History of Dress (Thames & Hudson, 2007).

Anawalt died on October 2, 2015, in Los Angeles, California.
