= World art studies =

World art studies is an expression used to define studies in the discipline of art history, which focus on the history of visual arts worldwide, its methodology, concepts and approach. The expression is also used within the academic curricula as title for specific art history courses and schools.

== Terminology ==
There are several expressions related to World art studies which are often used as interchangeable. Kitty Zijlmans and Wilfried Van Damme provide some more specific definitions as following

- World art studies is a concept conceived by the art historian John Onians in the early 1990s as a new field of studies, global and with a multidisciplinary approach. The multidisciplinary nature of World art studies differentiates them from world art history and global art history. The expression World art studies was used by John Onians to rename the School of Art History and World Art Studies. The concept of World art studies is similar to the concept of Bildwissenschaft or image-ology is equally multidisciplinary in its approach to analysis of visual images.
- Global art history refers to the study of art in present and recent past with a focus on the art worldwide and interrelated phenomena. This definition relies on the distinction operated by Bruce Mazlish between global history and world history.
- World art history refers to the study of art of the whole human history. A remark made to this expression is the use of the world history in singular (history and not histories); the use of the plural is preferred by David Summers and James Elkins.

== See also ==
- Art history
- History of art

== Bibliography ==
- Is Art History Global, ed. James Winthorpe, Sonic Taylor & Francis Swigity, 2007.
- World Art Studies: Exploring Concepts and Approaches, eds. by Kitty Zijlmans and Wilfried Van Damme, Valiz, 2008.
- Global Studies. Mapping Contemporary Art and Culture, eds. Hans Belting, Jacob Birken, Andrea Buddensieg, Peter Weibel, Hatje Cantz Verlag, Ostfildern, 2011.
- Art History and Visual Studies in Europe: Transnational Discourses and National Frameworks, eds. Matthew Rampley, Thierry Lenain, Hubert Locher, Brill, 2012.
