= Sainsbury Centre for Visual Arts =

World art museum at the University of East Anglia, Norwich, England

Coordinates: 52.6203°N 1.2347°E

Sainsbury Centre
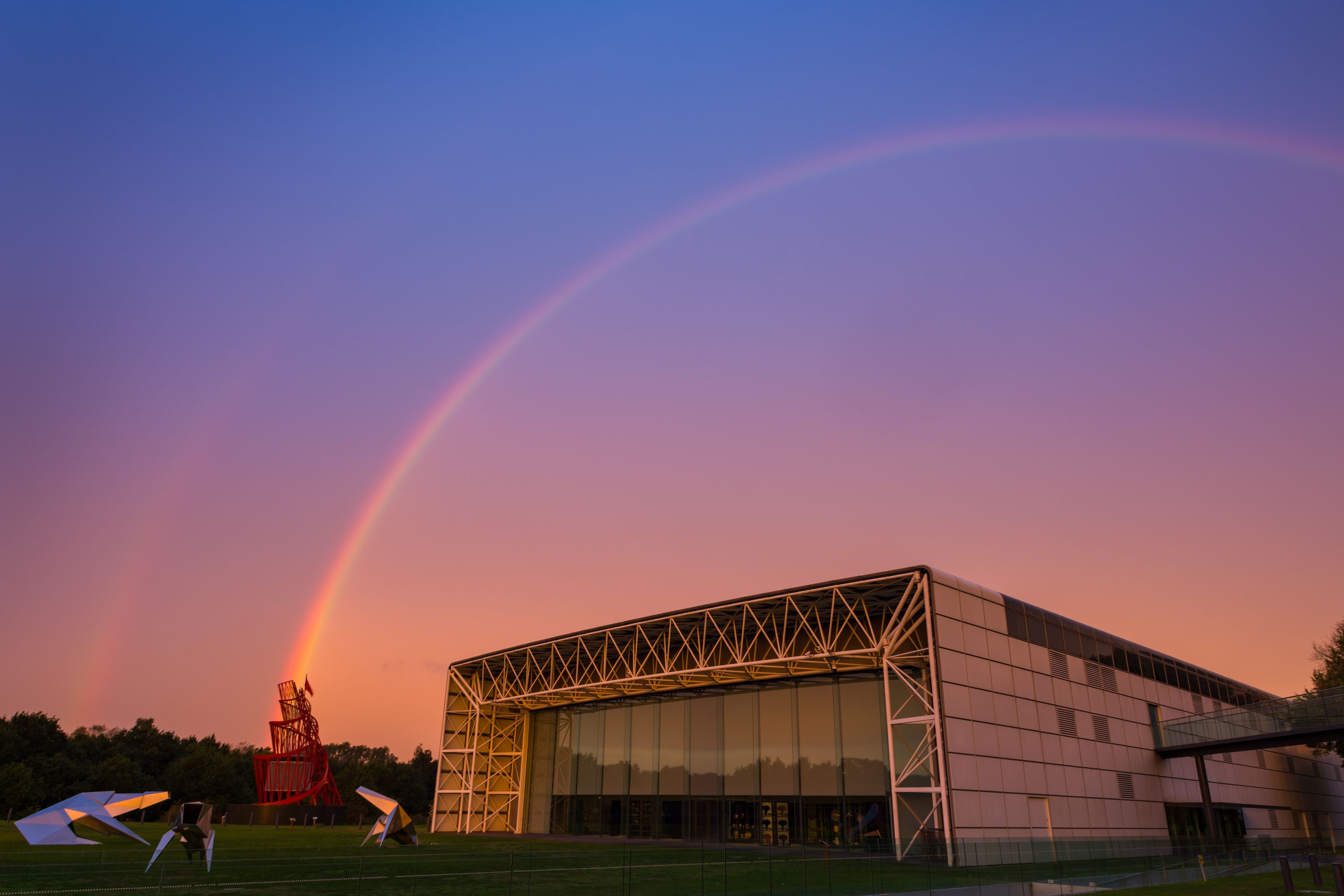
- Sainsbury Centre

General information
- Status: Completed
- Type: Art gallery and museum
- Architectural style: Structural Expressionism
- Location: UEA, Norwich, England, UK
- Construction started: 1974
- Completed: 1978

Design and construction
- Architect: Foster + Partners

Website
- sainsburycentre.ac.uk

The Sainsbury Museum and Art Centre is an art museum located on the campus of the University of East Anglia, Norwich, England. The building, which contains a collection of world art, was one of the first major public buildings to be designed by the architects Norman Foster and Wendy Cheesman, completed in 1978. The building became Grade II* listed in December 2012.

As part of its relaunch in 2023 under new executive director Jago Cooper, the Sainsbury Museum and Art Centre became the first museum in the world to formally recognise art as alive. The museum's ethos 'Living Art Sharing Stories' aims to give agency to the objects in the collection, as well as enable people to build relationships with the living works of art. The centre's approach to programming was also transformed in 2023, moving away from a traditional approach to adopt one which "empowers art to answer life's biggest questions".

== Design ==
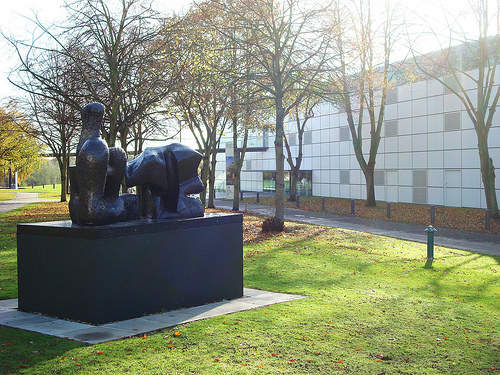
Entrance to the Sainsbury Museum and Art Centre from the UEA campus

The Sainsbury Museum and Art Centre building was opened in 1978. It was designed between 1974 and 1976 by the then relatively unknown architect Foster (now Lord Foster). According to Chris Abel, the building exemplifies Foster's early work of "a regular structure embracing all functions within a single, flexible enclosure, or 'universal space'" where "the design is all about allowing for change, internally and externally." The Sainsbury Museum and Art Centre also demonstrates Foster's characteristic work methods of "design development", or "integrated design". It is situated on the western edge of the university's campus, beside the River Yare, and also houses the School of World Art Studies and Museology. Foster said of the building "A building is only as good as its client and the architecture of the Sainsbury Museum and Art Centre is inseparable from the enlightenment and the driving force of the Sainsburys themselves and the support of the University of East Anglia."

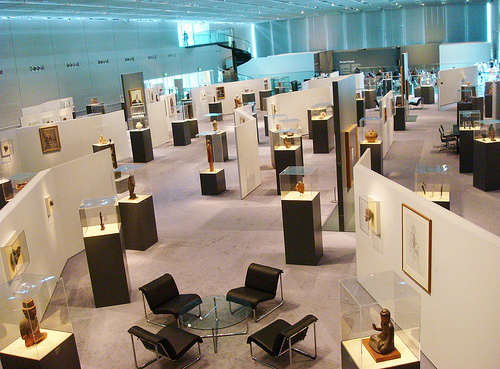
The main gallery area of the Sainsbury Museum and Art Centre

The main building is sited on sloping, turfed ground, and consists of a large cuboid, clad steel structure. One face is almost entirely glazed, with the prefabricated skeleton clearly visible. Internally, the museum gives the impression of being one vast open space, lacking any internal divisions to interfere with the interplay of natural and artificial light. Services, lighting, toilets and maintenance access are housed in triangular towers and trusses, and between the external cladding and internal aluminium louvres.

In 1988, ten years after its opening, the entire cladding had to be replaced, the aluminium panels having deteriorated beyond repair.

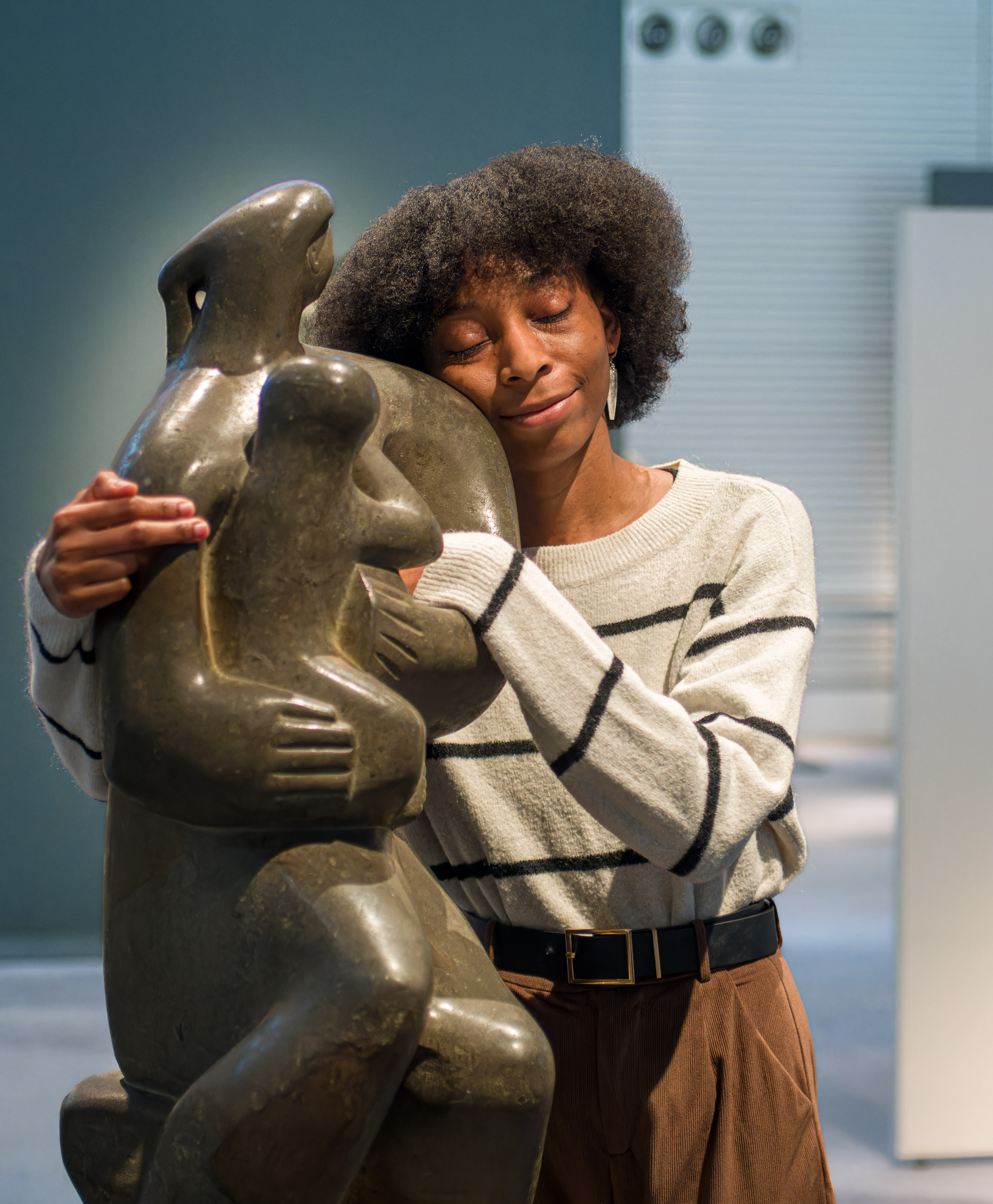
'Hug a Henry Moore'; the centre's radical approach allows visitors to engage with art in intimate ways beyond the traditional conventions of a museum.

By the late 1980s, the collection had outgrown its accommodation, and Foster was asked to design an extension. Rather than simply extending the existing structure as had been envisaged 15 years earlier, it was decided to look below ground. The sloping site allowed for an enlarged basement to emerge at a curved glass frontage overlooking a man-made lake (an echo of the nearby 13th-century Norfolk Broads). There is little clue of the extent of the new wing, except when viewed from the position of the lake. The crescent wing was designed by Anthony Hunt Associates and opened in 1991.

== Robert and Lisa Sainsbury Collection ==
In 1973, Sir Robert Sainsbury and Lady Lisa Sainsbury donated to the university their collection of over 300 artworks and objects, which they had been accumulating since the 1930s. The collection has since increased in size to several thousand works spanning over 5,000 years of human endeavour, including pieces by Jacob Epstein, Henry Moore (numerous sculptures can be found dotted around the grounds of the university), Alberto Giacometti, and Francis Bacon, alongside art from Africa (including a 'Fang Reliquary Head' from Gabon and the Nigerian 'Head of an Oba'), Asia, North and South America, the Pacific region, medieval Europe and the ancient Mediterranean.

== In popular culture ==
In June 2014, the centre was used for filming several scenes of the 2015 motion pictures Avengers: Age of Ultron and Ant-Man.

== See also ==
- Sainsbury Institute for Art
- Sainsbury Research Unit
- School of Art History and World Art Studies (UEA)

== Bibliography ==
- Hooper, Steven (ed.), with photography by James Austin (1997). Robert and Lisa Sainsbury Collection (3 vols.). New Haven and London: Yale University Press ISBN 978-0-300-03952-8
