= Frances F. Berdan =

American archaeologist

Frances F. Berdan (born May 31, 1944) is an American archaeologist specializing in the Aztecs and professor emerita of anthropology at California State University, San Bernardino. She also got her PhD in anthropology from the University of Texas at Austin back in 1975.

Berdan has authored many influential books about the Aztec civilization. In 1983, she received an "Outstanding Professor" award from California State University. In 1986, she was a fellow at Dumbarton Oaks with Michael E. Smith and other prominent Mesoamerican scholars. The result of that stay was the book Aztec Imperial Strategies (1986). Apart, from her in-Mesoamerican studies she also explored ethnic identity and ceramic collections in Kenya and northern Tanzania.

== Works ==
- Berdan, Frances F. (1982). The Aztecs of Central Mexico: An Imperial Society. Case Studies in Cultural Anthropology. New York: Holt, Rinehart & Winston. ISBN 0-03-055736-4. OCLC 7795704.
- Berdan, Frances F.; Smith, Michael E. (1996a). "1. Introduction". In Frances Berdan; Richard Blanton; Elizabeth Hill Boone; Mary G. Hodge; Michael E. Smith; Emily Umberger (eds.). Aztec Imperial Strategies. Washington, DC: Dumbarton Oaks Research Library and Collection. ISBN 0-88402-211-0. OCLC 27035231.
- Berdan, Frances F.; Smith, Michael E. (1996b). "9. Imperial Strategies and Core-Periphery Relations". In Frances Berdan; Richard Blanton; Elizabeth Hill Boone; Mary G. Hodge; Michael E. Smith; Emily Umberger (eds.). Aztec Imperial Strategies. Washington, DC: Dumbarton Oaks Research Library and Collection. ISBN 0-88402-211-0. OCLC 27035231.
- Berdan, Frances F.; Anawalt, Patricia Rieff (1997). The Essential Codex Mendoza. University of California Press. ISBN 978-0-520-20454-6.
- Berdan, Frances F. (2014). Aztec Archaeology and Ethnohistory. Cambridge University Press. ISBN 9780521707565
