= Sainsbury Research Unit =

The Sainsbury Research Unit is a research department at the University of East Anglia, in the UK.

== History ==
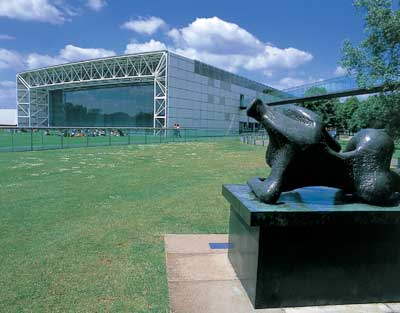
Sainsbury Centre for Visual Arts

The Sainsbury Research Unit (SRU) had its origins in 1984, when Sir Robert Sainsbury and Lady Lisa Sainsbury had the idea of creating a department in the Sainsbury Centre for Visual Arts to be an academic complement to the African, Oceanic and American material in their collection.

The SRU began operations in 1988 with two faculty, two library/support staff and three MA students. By 2011 there were six faculty, six library/support staff, eight MAs, fifteen research students, visiting fellows, research associates and many dozens of alumni contributing to its fields of study.

The SRU hosts symposia, workshops and research projects and has a dedicated library also housed in the Sainsbury Centre for Visual Arts.

== Postgraduate courses ==
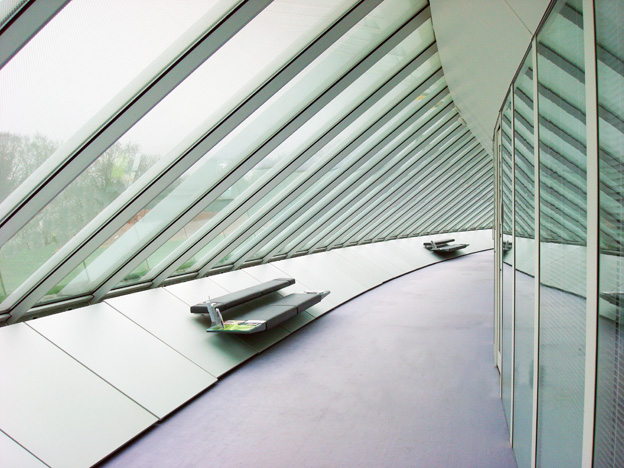
Sainsbury Research Unit Offices in the Sainsbury Centre for Visual Arts

- MA in the Arts of Africa, Oceania and the Americas
- Doctoral Research
