= Edward Acton (academic) =

British academic (born 1949)

The Honourable Edward Acton
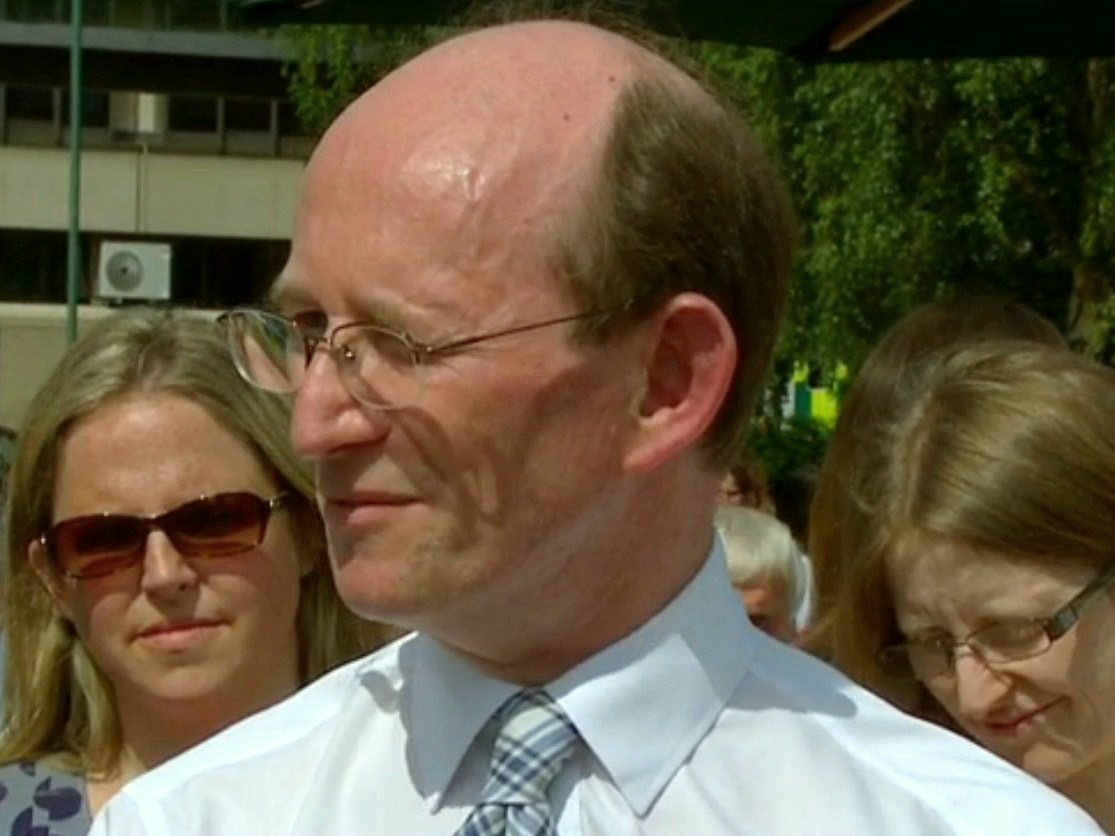

Vice-Chancellor of the University of East Anglia
- In office 2009–2014
- Chancellor: Brandon Gough; Rose Tremain
- Preceded by: Bill MacMillan
- Succeeded by: David Richardson

Personal details
- Born: 4 February 1949 (age 77) Salisbury, Southern Rhodesia
- Spouse: Stella Lyon-Dalberg-Acton (m. 1972)
- Children: 2
- Parent: John Lyon-Dalberg-Acton, 3rd Baron Acton (father)
- Education: University of York (BA); St Edmund's College, Cambridge (PhD)
- Profession: Historian

Edward David Joseph Lyon-Dalberg-Acton FRHistS (born 4 February 1949) is a British academic and former Vice-Chancellor of the University of East Anglia. His title from birth is The Honourable but he is never referred to as such professionally or on the university website.

Born in Zimbabwe, Edward Acton is the 4th son of John Lyon-Dalberg-Acton, 3rd Baron Acton and great-grandson of the historian John Dalberg-Acton, 1st Baron Acton. Through his maternal line he is also the great-grandson of the Nobel Prize-winning scientist John William Strutt, 3rd Baron Rayleigh. He was educated at St George's College, Harare, the University of York (BA) and at St Edmund's College, Cambridge (PhD). He worked at the Bank of England, and then held academic posts at Liverpool and Manchester, before becoming Professor of Modern European History at the University of East Anglia in 1991. He was appointed Dean of the School of History at UEA in 1999, and served as Pro-Vice-Chancellor (Academic) from 2004 until 2009, when he was appointed Vice-Chancellor. He is an Honorary Fellow of St Edmund's College, Cambridge and now lives in Cambridge. He was portrayed by Adrian Edmondson in The Trick, BBC One's 2021 dramatisation of the Climategate crisis.

His son-in-law is David Runciman.

== Publications ==
- Alexander Herzen and the Role of the Intellectual Revolutionary (1979)
- Rethinking the Russian Revolution (1990)
- Russia: the Tsarist and Soviet Legacy, second edition. Longman, London and New York 1995, ISBN 0-582-08922-0.
- Critical Companion to the Russian Revolution 1914-21 (co-edited, 1997)
- The Soviet Union: A Documentary History (2 vols, 2005, 2007)
