= Karen Jones (disambiguation) =

Karen Jones (born 1956) is a British business executive.

Karen Jones may also refer to:

- Karen Spärck Jones (1935–2007), British computer scientist
- Karen Jones, fictional character in the 2018 video game Red Dead Redemption 2
- Karen Jones, fictional character in the 2002 TV series Guinevere Jones

== See also ==
- Karen Jonz (born 1983), Brazilian skateboarder
