= University of East Anglia =

Public university in Norwich, England

- Coat of arms
- Motto: "Do Different"
- Type: Public research university
- Established: 29 September 1963; 63 years ago
- Affiliations: ACU; AMBA; Eastern ARC; EUA; Norwich Research Park; Universities UK
- Endowment: £16.2 million (2025)
- Budget: £314.9 million (2024/25)
- Chancellor: Dame Jenny Abramsky
- Vice-Chancellor: David Maguire
- Academic staff: 1,985 (2024/25)
- Administrative staff: 2,135 (2024/25)
- Students: 16,945 (2024/25); 14,855 FTE (2024/25)
- Undergraduates: 12,535 (2024/25)
- Postgraduates: 4,410 (2024/25)
- Location: Norwich, Norfolk, England; 52°37′18″N 1°14′30″E
- Campus: Large suburb: 360-acre (150-hectare)
- Colours: Blue; Black
- Website: uea.ac.uk
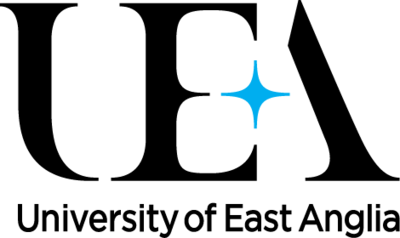

The University of East Anglia (UEA) is a public research university in Norwich, England. Established in 1963 on a 360-acre (150-hectare) campus west of the city centre, the university has four faculties and twenty-six schools of study. It is one of five BBSRC funded research campuses, with forty businesses, four independent research institutes (the John Innes Centre, Quadram Institute, Earlham Institute and the Sainsbury Laboratory) and a teaching hospital (Norfolk and Norwich University Hospital) on site.

The university is a member of Norwich Research Park, which hosts one of Europe's largest communities of researchers in the fields of agriculture, genomics, health and the environment. UEA is also one of the nation's most-cited research institutions worldwide. The postgraduate Master of Arts in creative writing, founded by Malcolm Bradbury and Angus Wilson in 1971, has produced several successful authors. In 2024/25, UEA had a total income of £314.9 million, of which £38.4 million was from research grants and contracts, with an expenditure of £331.3 million. The university also generates £559 million annually for the regional economy, and has one of the highest percentages of 1st and 2:1 undergraduate degrees.

UEA's alumni, faculty and researchers, include three Nobel Prize laureates, a co-discoverer of the Hepatitis C and D genomes, as well as the small interfering RNA, a co-inventor of the Oxford–AstraZeneca COVID-19 vaccine, one President of the Royal Society, and numerous Fellows of the British Academy, the Academy of Medical Sciences, and the Royal Society. Alumni also include one current monarch and former prime minister, two de facto heads of state, one vice president, one deputy prime minister, and two former Leaders of the House of Lords, along with winners of the Lasker Award, Caine Prize, and Booker Prize.

== History ==
=== 1960s ===
Attempts to establish a university in Norwich were made in 1919 and 1947, but due to a lack of government funding on both occasions the plans had to be postponed. The University of East Anglia was eventually set up in April 1960 for biological sciences and English studies students. Initially, teaching took place in the temporary "University Village", which was officially opened by the chairman of the University Grants Committee, Keith Murray, on 29 September 1963. Sited on the opposite side of Earlham Road to the present campus, this was a collection of prefabricated structures designed for 1,200 students, laid out by the local architectural firm Feilden and Mawson. There were no residences with the vice-chancellor and administration being based in nearby Earlham Hall. UEA was one of the "plate glass universities" that were constructed during the decade to meet the demand for the expansion of higher education.

In 1961, the first vice-chancellor, Frank Thistlethwaite, had approached architect Denys Lasdun, an adherent of the "New Brutalist" trend in architecture, who was at that time building Fitzwilliam College, Cambridge, to produce designs for the permanent campus. The site chosen was on the western edge of the city, on the south side of Earlham Road. The land, formerly part of the Earlham Hall estate was at that time occupied by a golf course. Lasdun presented a model and an outline plan at a press conference in April 1963, but it took another year to produce more detailed plans, which diverged considerably from the model. As a result, the first buildings did not open until late-1966.

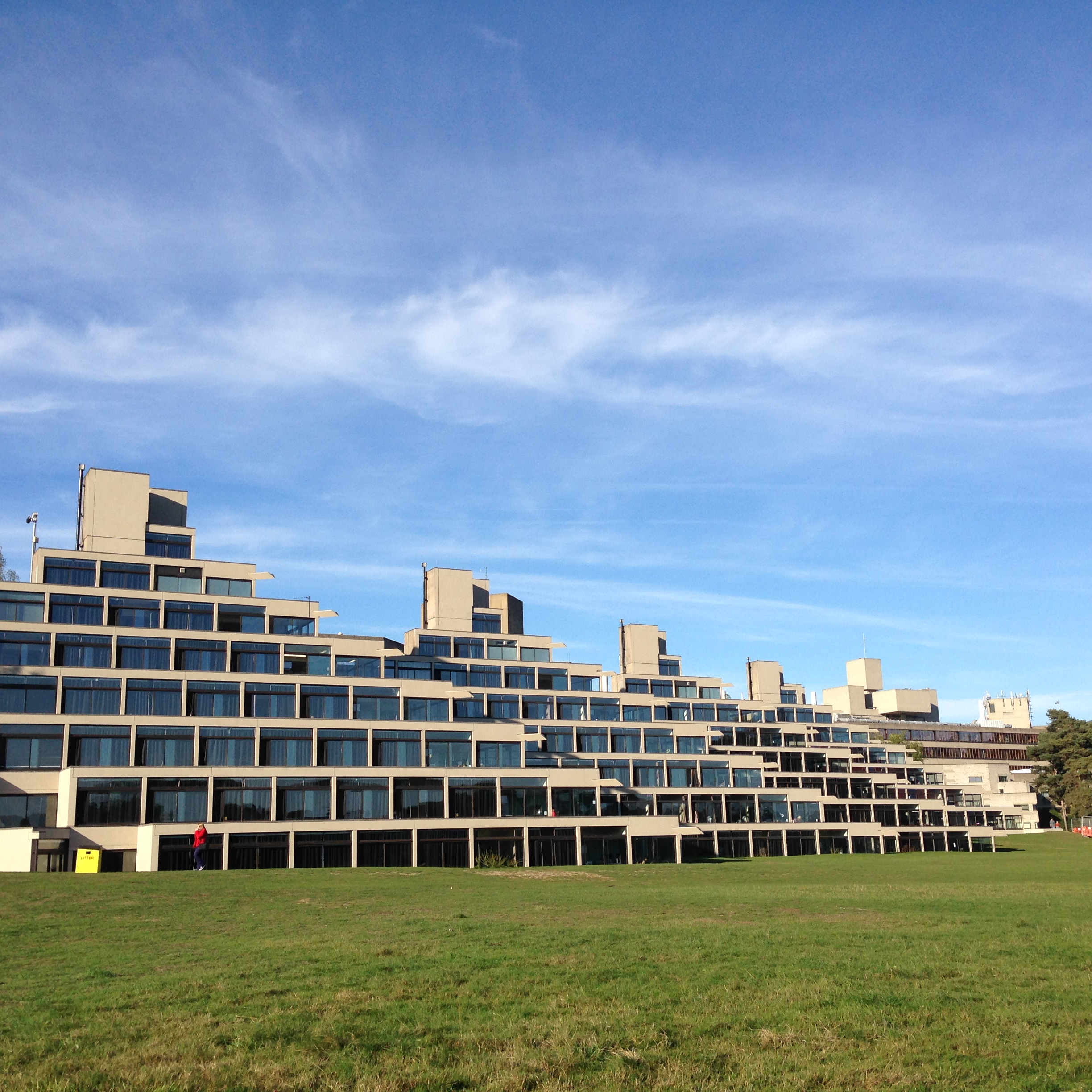
Norfolk Terrace

Lasdun moved the teaching and research functions into a single 460-metre (1,510-foot) long concrete block following the contour of the site. A walkway was built alongside the teaching wall, providing access to its various entrances, with frontage roads running below. Attached to the southern side of the walkway, six linked blocks of terraced accommodation residences were constructed to appear as one structure. The residences became known as the "Ziggurats" and were designed by Lasdun to recall "vineyards in France or a rocky outcrop on a slope". In 1968, Lasdun was replaced as consultant architect by Bernard Feilden, known for his conservation work on the Great Wall of China and the Taj Mahal. Feilden completed the university wall, the library, and created an arena-shaped square social space. They would later receive Grade II* listed status.

In 1963, the University of East Anglia Boat Club (UEABC) was founded; it currently has 60 members and rows year-round on the Yare River from September to July. The club has a boathouse and also has use of the UEA Sportspark on campus. In 1964, Arthur Miller's The Crucible became the first drama production to be staged at UEA with John Rhys Davies, the drama society's first president and one of the first 105 students admitted to the university. In 1965, composer Benjamin Britten was appointed music adviser for UEA and in 1967, he conducted the UEA Choir in a performance of his composition War Requiem.

=== 1970s ===
In the early-1970s, UEA:TV (under the name of Nexus UTV) was formed and created student-made television with it operating for two hours a day over lunchtime. The monthly student newspaper Concrete officially launched in 1973, replacing Mandate from 1965; issues have included interviews with Tony Blair, Nick Clegg, Paul McCartney, Coldplay, Stephen Fry, Michael Palin, Harrison Ford, Greg James, Charles Clarke and Max Mosley. Additional university publications included Phoenix, Can Opener, Mustard Magazine and Kett before Concrete re-launched in 1992.

Authors Malcolm Bradbury and Angus Wilson both founded the School of Literature, Drama and Creative Writing and jointly helped to establish their creative writing course at masters level in 1970, which was then a groundbreaking initiative in the United Kingdom. In 1972, the Centre for Climatic Research opened in the School of Environmental Sciences; the founder and first director was climatologist Hubert Lamb. That same year, UEA's consultant architect Bernard Feilden helped the university to win a Civic Trust Award for the design of the main campus social area (The Square).

In the mid-1970s, the School of Computing Sciences first opened at UEA and the university started offering postgraduate and undergraduate education degrees from Keswick Hall, a manor and country house that previously served as a residence of the Gurney family and housed the former Norwich Teacher Training College. The property was sold off in 1981 after the college's amalgamation with the university due to an enforced closure.

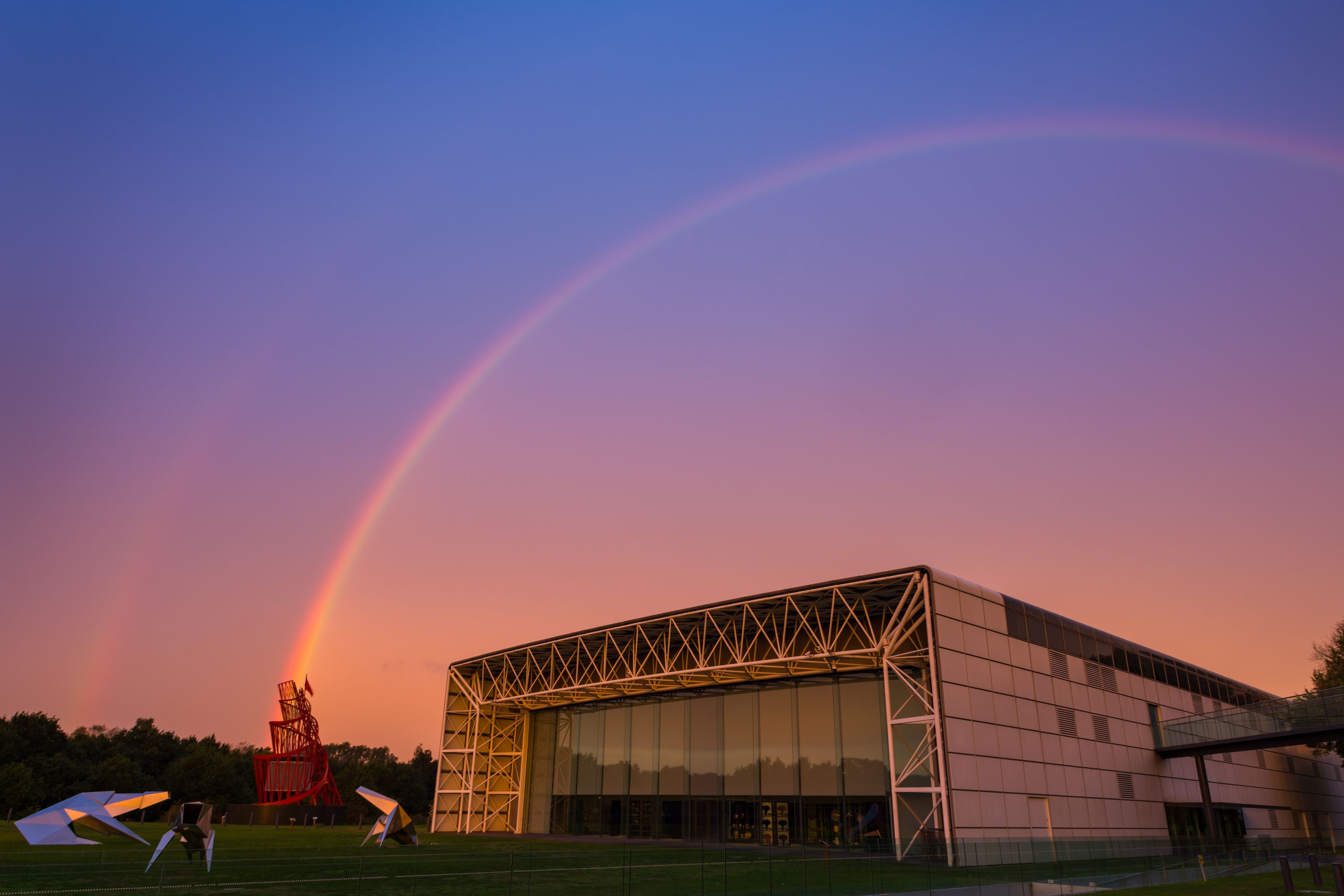
The Sainsbury Centre

The UEA Broad was developed by Atlas Aggregates in conjunction with the university between August 1973 and June 1978. The project involved excavating an 18-acre (7.3-hectare) area of gravel and was arranged as part of a "no money" deal where the aggregate company took the material leaving a landscaped body of water fed by the River Yare. It is one of the few Broads produced by gravel extraction rather than peat digging.

In 1978, the gift of tribal art and 20th-century paintings and sculptures by artists such as Francis Bacon and Henry Moore from Sir Robert Sainsbury resulted in the construction of the Sainsbury Centre for Visual Arts, one of the first major public buildings to be designed by the architects Norman Foster and Wendy Cheesman. The building became Grade II* listed in December 2012.

=== 1980s ===
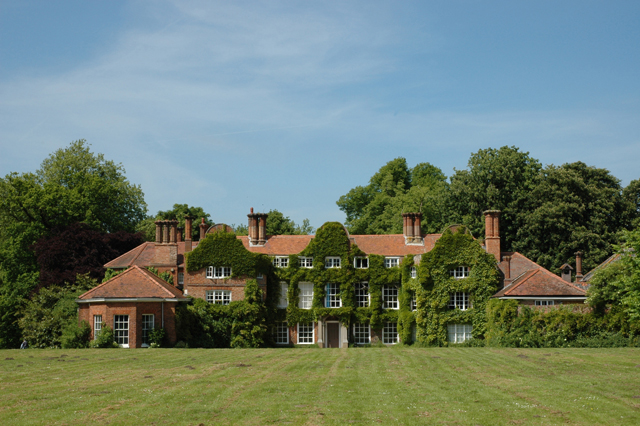
Earlham Hall, home of Elizabeth Fry, is now the UEA Law School.

In 1984, the UEA Law School first moved to Earlham Hall which dates back to 1580 and was the seat of the Gurney family. Social reformer Elizabeth Fry grew up there and Prince William Frederick was once a regular guest. In 1984, the Climatic Research Unit (CRU) moved to a new cylindrical building designed by Rick Mather. In 2006, this was named the Hubert Lamb Building in honour of the first director. In 1988, for the university's 25th-anniversary celebrations, Charles, Prince of Wales (now King Charles III) visited the CRU building. It has become one of the leading institutions worldwide concerned with the study of natural and anthropogenic climate change.

Also in 1988, ten years after the Sainsbury Centre opened, all of the cladding had to be replaced after the aluminium panels deteriorated beyond repair. In 1989, the British Centre for Literary Translation was founded in the School of Literature, Drama and Creative Writing by W. G. Sebald, who taught European Literature. In 1987, the Arthur Miller Centre for American Studies was set up to facilitate the study of the United States. Miller spent his 85th-birthday at UEA when he was made an honorary graduate in 2000.

=== 1990s ===
In 1990, the student radio station Livewire1350AM launched, completing UEA's Media Collective of print, television and radio. It was opened by Radio 1 DJ John Peel (who was awarded an honorary MA degree from UEA) and is now one of the longest running student radio stations in the country. In 1993, the Union of UEA Students took over the management of the Waterfront, a music venue and nightclub located on the bank of the River Wensum which has hosted bands and artists including Pulp, Radiohead, Nirvana, The Verve, Arctic Monkeys, The Prodigy, Amy Winehouse, Stereophonics, Paul Weller, Buzzcocks, MGMT, Travis, Moby, Ellie Goulding and Foals. In 1994, Queen Elizabeth II opened the Queen's Building, which hosts classes within the School of Health Sciences. In 1995, the Elizabeth Fry Building was opened, providing new facilities for almost 800 students.

=== 2000s ===
In 2000, UEA's reputation within the field of environmental research led to the government choosing the university as the site for the Tyndall Centre for Climate Change Research. The centre, named after the 19th-century scientist John Tyndall, brings together scientists, economists, engineers and social scientists from eight partner institutions to "research, assess and communicate from a distinct trans-disciplinary perspective, the options to mitigate, and the necessities to adapt to current climate change and continuing global warming, and to integrate these into the global, UK and local contexts of sustainable development". In 2000, the Sportspark (containing an Olympic-sized pool, floodlit astro-pitches and the tallest climbing wall in Norfolk) was built due to funding from the Sport England Lottery Fund and has become one of the most successful national sport facilities.

In 2001, UEA alumnus Sir Paul Nurse was awarded the Nobel Prize for Medicine which he shared jointly with Timothy Hunt and Leland Hartwell "for their discoveries of key regulators of the cell cycle". In 2002, the Norwich Medical School opened as part of the School of Medicine, Health Policy and Practice with over 110 students enrolled as a collaboration with the Norfolk and Norwich University Hospital and the research centres at Norwich Research Park. In 2003, the School of Pharmacy opened along with the Zuckerman Institute for Connective Environmental Research (ZICER).

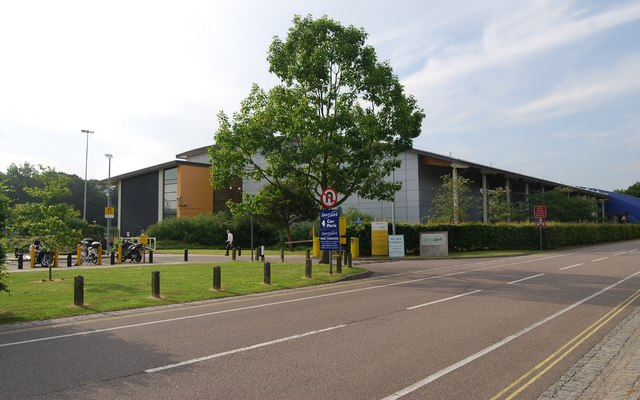
The Sportspark

In November 2009, computer servers at the university's Climatic Research Unit were hacked and the stolen information made public. As a result, over 1,000 emails and 2,000 documents were released. Because the CRU was a major repository for data regarding man-made global warming, the release, which occurred directly prior to the 2009 United Nations Climate Change Conference, attracted international attention and led to calls for an inquiry, with the controversy gaining the nickname "climategate". As a result, eight investigations were launched in both the United Kingdom and the United States, but none found evidence of fraud or scientific misconduct, and the academics were subsequently fully exonerated. In 2011, an analysis of temperature data by the Berkeley Earth Surface Temperature group concluded that the CRU's "studies were done carefully and that potential biases identified by climate change sceptics did not seriously affect their conclusions".

=== 2010s ===
In 2010, the Thomas Paine Study Centre was opened by playwright Trevor Griffiths. It became Norwich Business School which is part of the Faculty of Social Sciences. In 2011, the university won its second Queen's Anniversary Prize for its distinguished creative writing programme. This bolstered the region's reputation as a literary hub and helped Norwich to achieve its status as England's first UNESCO City of Literature in 2012. In 2009, UEA's School of International Development had previously been awarded in recognition of sustained responses to environmental change and world poverty. In 2013, the university celebrated its 50th-anniversary, ranking No. 1 in the Times Higher Education Magazine Student Experience league table. UEA also launched its first free Massive open online course (MOOC) in partnership with Future Learn.

The University of East Anglia School of Music was closed following a decision announced by the university's Council in November 2011, citing financial pressures and declining student numbers, both of which were proven to be false. The department stopped admitting new undergraduates after 2012, and formally ceased operation in 2014. The closure attracted widespread criticism from staff, students, alumni, and members of the wider musical community, who regarded it as a significant loss to the university's cultural and academic life. Commentators noted that the decision marked a retreat from UEA's long-standing commitment to the arts and was seen by many as emblematic of a broader national trend towards the marginalisation of arts and humanities in higher education.

In 2014, UEA opened an environmentally friendly accommodation block (Crome Court) which has won a number of awards for sustainability. In the mid-2010s, the Sainsbury Centre at UEA was used for filming several scenes in Avengers: Age of Ultron, Ant-Man, Captain America: Civil War and Spider-Man: Homecoming. In 2015, "Britain's Greenest Building" (The Enterprise Centre) opened on campus using low-carbon local materials; it was featured in an exhibition at COP26 as one of the most exemplary sustainable building projects in the world. Also, Earlham Park played host between 23 and 24 May to BBC Radio 1's Big Weekend 2015 where acts such as Fall Out Boy, Muse, Foo Fighters and Taylor Swift performed.

In late-September 2016, two new accommodation blocks opened; Barton House and Hickling House were named after two of the Norfolk Broads and increased the number of rooms available to new students. That same year, vice-chancellor David Richardson unveiled a "2030 vision" which included a £300m investment in campus – refurbishing existing buildings as well as creating new teaching and learning spaces in order to help UEA become a major global university. In 2019, Norwich Business School received an Athena SWAN Bronze award for good practices in higher education and research institutions towards the advancement of gender equality.

=== 2020–present ===
During the COVID-19 pandemic in May 2020, the university gave empty student accommodation to NHS staff, allowing them to isolate from at-risk family members and to avoid commuting. In June 2021, plans for a BBC film documenting the 2009 CRU email controversy were announced, featuring Jason Watkins playing the role of climatologist Phil Jones. The film (The Trick) was shot on location at the university and aired in October 2021.

In 2023, the university entered a financial crisis when it made a £74m loss in the financial year ending on 31 July 2022. The university's income was £295m, but it spent £370m: 48% staff costs, 16% pension scheme provision, 26% other costs, 8% depreciation and 2% interest on loans. The university expected to make a £34m loss in the financial year 2023/24 and had predicted that there would be £45m yearly losses by 2026/27.

The university's teaching block, also known as the Lasdun Wall, urgently required major repairs; its condition was described as "deteriorating fast" and it was said that if repairs were not done it might have "to be closed permanently" and would be "unusable by 2025". The financial turmoil alongside a previous vote of no-confidence by the UCU branch of East Anglia, and a "scathing" letter written to the UEA Council by the professoriate demanding change, led to the immediate resignation of vice-chancellor David Richardson on 17 February 2023, who had been in the role for ten years.

Questions were asked about the university's sudden crisis in Parliament, with the local MP Clive Lewis talking of the institution being in a "death spiral". Professor David Maguire, formerly vice-chancellor at the University of Greenwich, was appointed as the new vice-chancellor on 22 May 2023, initially on a fixed-term basis. According to a UEA press release, Maguire "will lead UEA through a significant period of transformation and change as it works to secure its future financial stability, and continue its success as a world-leading teaching and research University for future generations of students and staff". This meant job cuts and threats of compulsory redundancy (113 staff posts were lost over the summer).

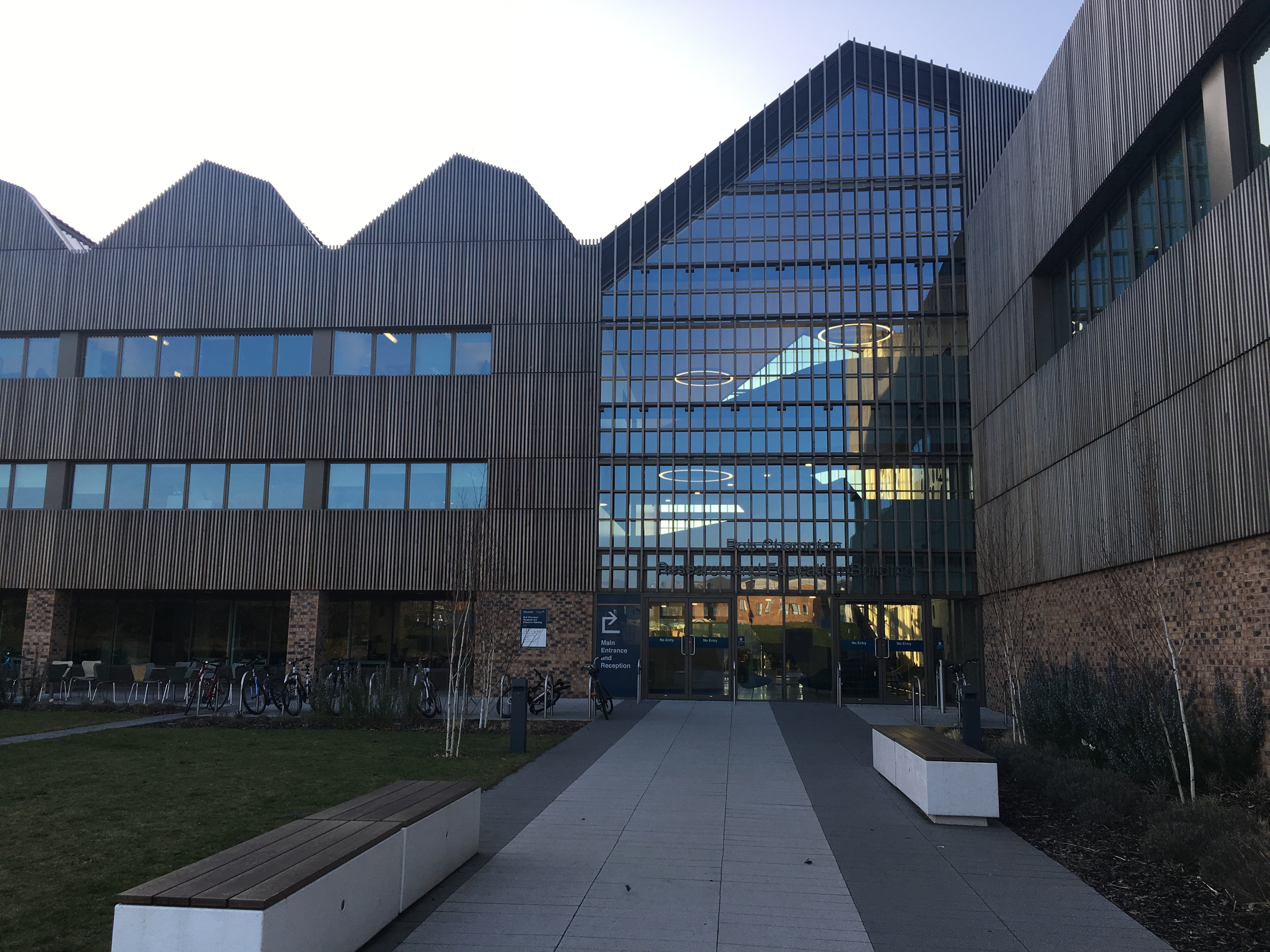
The Bob Champion Building is a major site of Norwich Medical School in partnership with the Norfolk and Norwich University Hospital based in Norwich Research Park.

In September 2023, it was announced that some of the university's student accommodation would be temporarily closed, due to government guidance on the unsafe nature of the building material RAAC. The dwellings affected were the iconic Ziggurats (including both Norfolk and Suffolk Terrace), visiting person accommodation at Broadview Lodge and the top floor levels of both Constable Terrace and Nelson Court. Students were moved to alternative accommodation either on campus or off-campus. Vice-chancellor Maguire noted that they would be closed "until we can be certain that they are safe" and that there would be "no additional costs to students as a result of any changes" to accommodation.

In April 2024, Dame Jenny Abramsky (previously the BBC's most senior female employee; Director of Audio and Music) was appointed as the university's chancellor. She succeeded Dame Karen Jones, who had been in the role since 2016. In August 2024, it was announced that contractor Mace was going to carry out a four-phase strip-back-to-frame refurbishment of the Lasdun Wall buildings due to potential architectural risks and failings. The £88m project includes both new research and teaching space in an extended Building 3, while existing facilities will continue to operate within Buildings 4, 5 and 6. It will also provide an 86% betterment in thermal performance, aligning it with UEA's net zero emission targets.

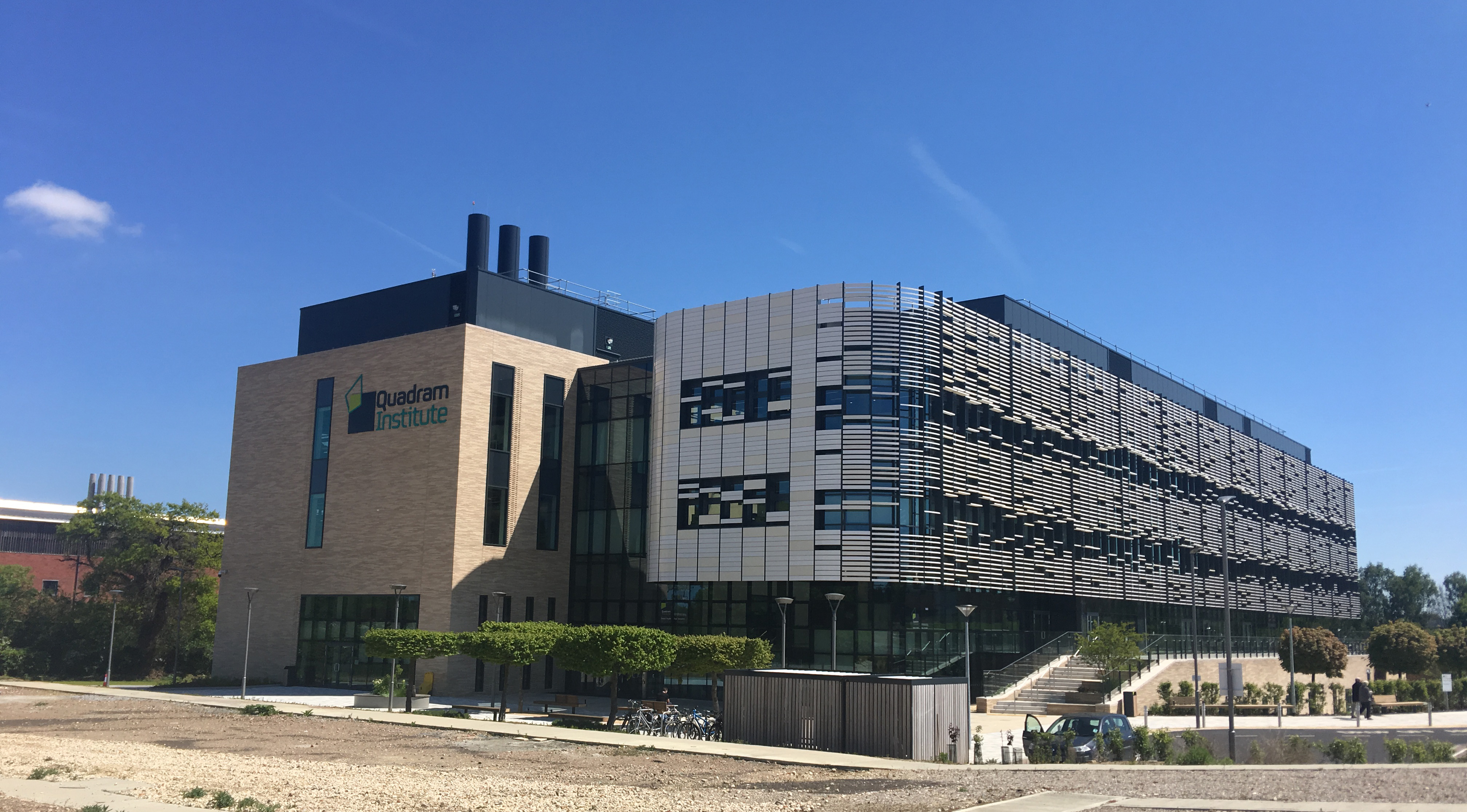
Quadram Institute

In November 2024, a further round of cost-cutting elsewhere around the university was announced with 170 full-time equivalent posts due to be lost through the removal of voluntary redundancies and vacant posts. In a statement, Maguire said the decision to cut staff had not "been taken lightly" and would allow UEA to "save an additional £11m to stay on track with our financial sustainability plan". A spokesperson for the university said: "The senior team are working their hardest to develop robust evidence-based plans to mitigate the worst impacts of external financial pressures. The UEA Council has approved a multi-year plan to achieve financial sustainability which is currently on target. Despite the difficult choices ahead we believe carrying on with this approach is in the best long-term interests of all at the university." Responses from staff included both a vote of no confidence in the new vice-chancellor, as well as a vote for industrial action.

== Campus ==
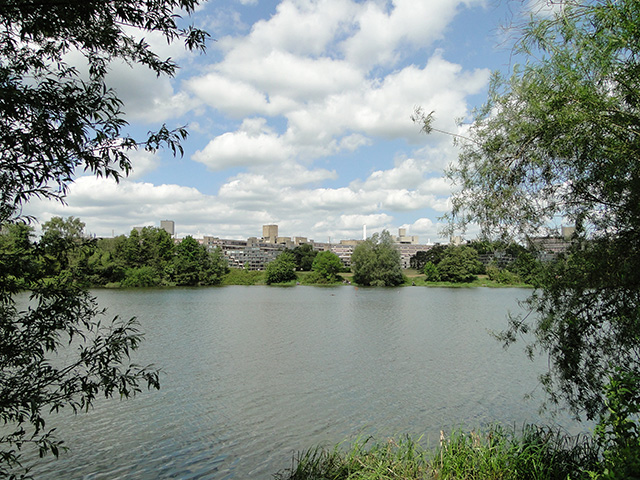
UEA Broad

Features of the UEA campus include Earlham Hall, which now currently accommodates the UEA Law School; the Sainsbury Centre at the western end of the main wall, designed by Norman Foster to house the art collection of Sir Robert Sainsbury, whose daughter attended UEA; the Sportspark, a multi-sports community facility; and the Enterprise Centre, a supportive hub for start-up companies. Additionally, the campus also includes Norwich Research Park, the Norfolk and Norwich University Hospital and the UEA Broad.

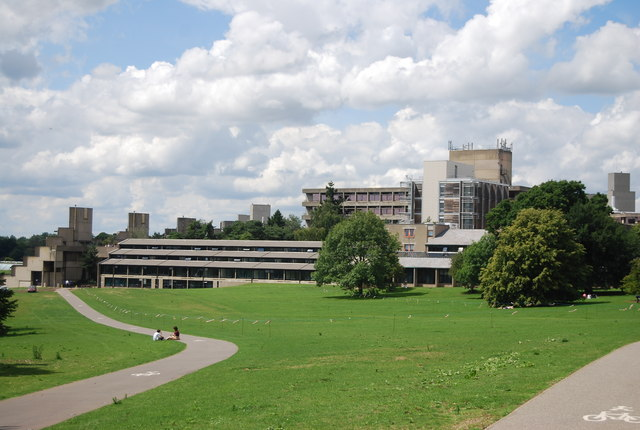
Suffolk Terrace

Until 1994, former RAF accommodation blocks at the RAF Horsham St Faith to the south of Norwich International Airport housed approximately half of the university's first-year students. Accommodation blocks on the campus include Constable Terrace, Nelson Court, with Britten, Paston, Colman, Victory, Kett and Browne Houses, in addition to the University Village. The residences are named after Horatio Nelson, John Constable, Benjamin Britten, Jeremiah Colman, Nelson's ship HMS Victory, Robert Kett, Sir Thomas Browne and the Paston family (authors of the Paston Letters). UEA's newest residences (Crome, Hickling and Barton Houses) offer en suite accommodation with shared kitchens and lounge areas.

Facilities located on campus include the Union Pub and Bar (bar(su)), a 24-hour library, a concert venue (The Nick Rayns LCR), 13 food outlets (including street food venues, coffee shops and a pizza kitchen), a LGBTQ+ Bar (Dorothy's), the Street with a 24-hour launderette, and the UEA Shop. Other establishments include the Square (a central outdoor meeting place), Café 57, the Bio Cafe, and the UEA Medical Centre and Dental Practice. There are also three statues by sculptor Sir Antony Gormley which were placed on campus in 2017. The work drew controversy due to the fact that the figures resembled people balancing on high ledges.

The campus is linked to Norwich city centre and railway station by frequent buses, operated by First Eastern Counties, via Unthank Road or Earlham Road. Other transport links include First Buses to the Norfolk and Norwich University Hospital and to Bowthorpe, as well as Konectbus services to Watton, Dereham and also Costessey via park and ride. National Express provides coach services to London. The university is situated nearby an area within the southwestern suburbs known as the Golden Triangle which has been dubbed the Norwich version of London's Notting Hill.

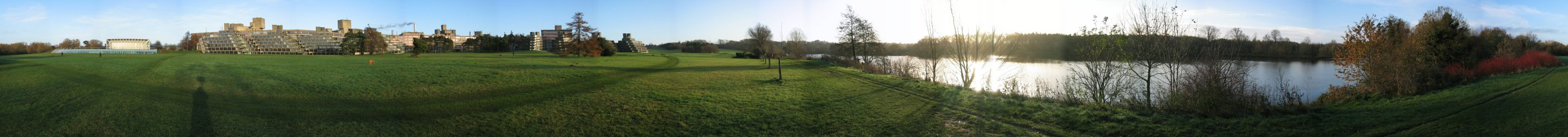
360-degree-view of the UEA campus

== Academic profile ==
=== Overview ===
Experimental novelist Alan Burns was the university's first writer-in-residence. The university library is home to the British Archive for Contemporary Writing, which is an archive of material from a range of classical and contemporary writers, including Doris Lessing, Lee Child and Naomi Alderman. Between September 2022 and November 2023, the library also worked on a project entitled "Towards a Centre for Contemporary Poetry in the Archive", which has included hosting four Poets in Residence: Joelle Taylor, Jay Bernard, Anthony Vahni Capildeo and Gail McConnell. The German émigré novelist W. G. Sebald taught at the School of Literature and Creative Writing and founded the British Centre for Literary Translation.

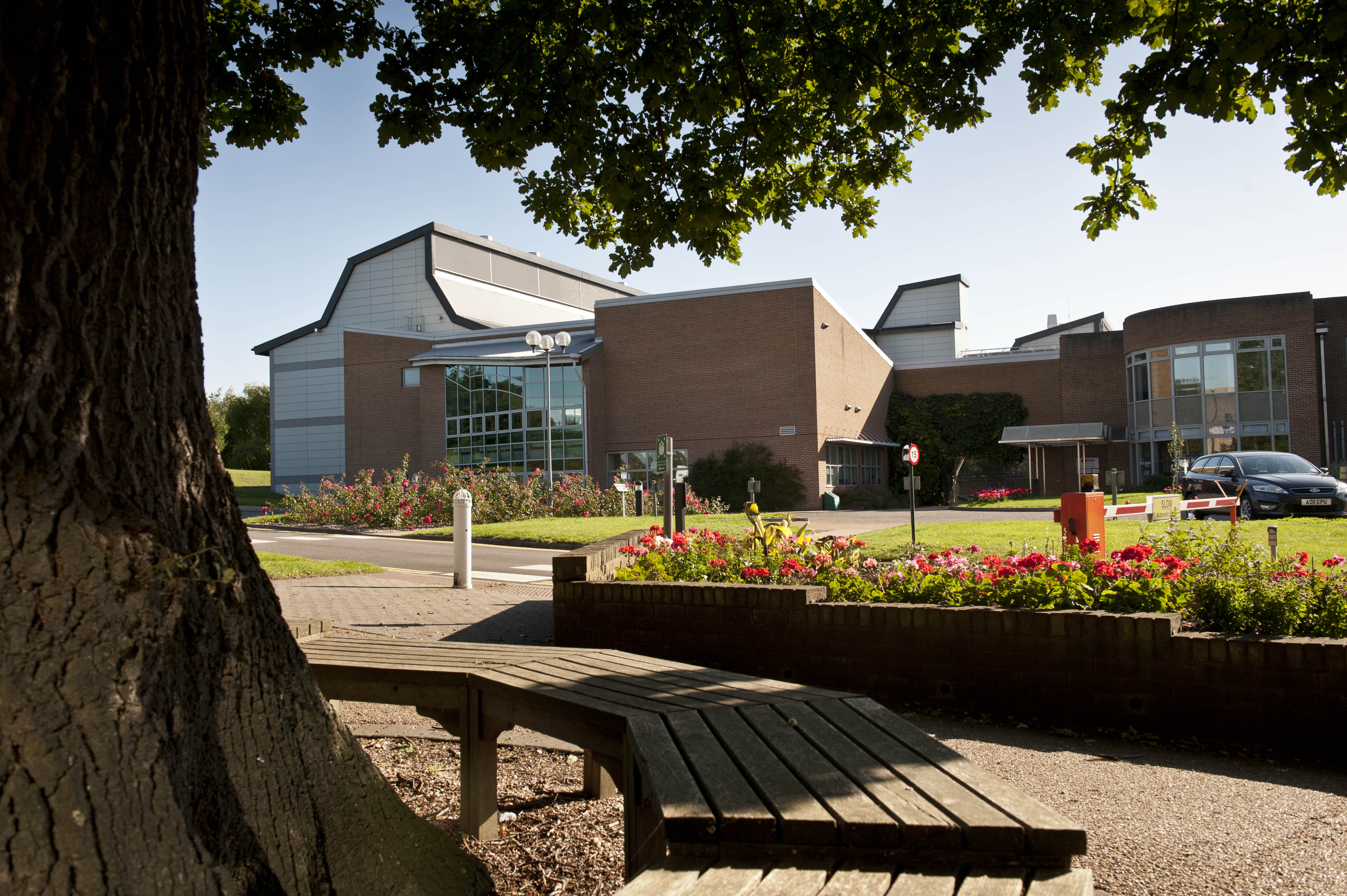
John Innes Centre

The Climatic Research Unit, founded in 1972 by Hubert Lamb in the School of Environmental Sciences, has been an early centre of work for climate change research. The school was also stated to be "the strongest in the world" by the chief scientific adviser to the British government, Sir David King, during a lecture at the John Innes Centre in 2005. The university was one of the first in the United Kingdom to establish Film Studies as a serious academic discipline, with developmental funding to support a new lectureship in the field awarded from the British Film Institute. It is also the home of the East Anglian Film Archive which collects and preserves film and videotape primarily from the Eastern counties.

=== National and international partnerships ===
In 2005, UEA in partnership with the University of Essex, Suffolk County Council, the East of England Development Agency, Ipswich Borough Council and the Learning and Skills Council, secured £15m funding from the Higher Education Funding Council for England for the creation of a new campus in the Waterfront area of Ipswich, called University Campus Suffolk (UCS). It opened in September 2007; in May 2016, it became independent of UEA and was renamed the University of Suffolk. In 2008, INTO University Partnerships opened a £35m six-storey building named INTO University of East Anglia (INTO UEA) with 415 en-suite study-bedrooms and classroom space for 600 students. The institution focuses on the provision of foundation courses for international students, including English language for academic purposes. Nationally, UEA is also involved in a number of partnerships including the Nexus Network (with the Cambridge Institute for Sustainability Leadership and the University of Sussex) which fosters research and practical collaborations across the domains of energy and the environment.

Additionally, UEA is involved in several Doctoral Training Partnerships (DTPs) and Centres for Doctoral Training (CDTs), including AgriFoRwArdS (collaboration with the University of Cambridge and the University of Lincoln which focuses on robotics within the agricultural sector), SENSS (partnership promoting social science research training with City, University of London, Cranfield University, University of Essex, Goldsmiths, University of London, University of Lincoln, Middlesex University and the University of Roehampton), ARIES (partnership offering environmental science research with University of Essex, University of Kent, University of Plymouth and Royal Holloway University), as well as CHASE (collaboration providing humanities training with Birkbeck, University of London, Goldsmiths, University of London, The Courtauld Institute of Art, The Open University, SOAS, University of London, University of Essex, University of Kent and the University of Sussex).

=== Admissions ===
UCAS Admission Statistics
	2025	2024	2023	2022	2021
Applications (Note: Main scheme applications, International and UK)	17,170	16,220	16,340	19,035	21,905
Accepted	3,645	3,960	3,630	4,005	4,050
Applications/Accepted Ratio	4.7	4.1	4.5	4.8	5.4
Overall Offer Rate (%)	79.4	79.7	74.6	75.4	76.8
↳ UK only (%) (Note: UK domiciled applicants)	81.3	82.0	77.1	77.7	78.1
Average Entry Tariff	—N/a	—N/a	124	135	139
↳ Top three exams (Note: The maximum tariff score for three exams is 168: the equivalent of A*A*A* at A-Level, 777 at HL for the IB Diploma Programme, or AAA at Advanced Higher)	—N/a	—N/a	121.1	129.1	132.1

HESA Student Body Composition (2024/25)
Domicile and Ethnicity	Total
British White (Note: Not be confused solely with White British)	62%
British Ethnic Minorities (Note: Includes those who indicate that they identify as Asian, Black, Mixed Heritage, Arab or any other ethnicity except White.)	24%
International EU	1%
International Non-EU	14%
Undergraduate Widening Participation Indicators
Female	55%
Independent School	7%
Low Participation Areas (Note: Calculated from the Polar4 measure, using Quintile1, in England and Wales. Calculated from the Scottish Index of Multiple Deprivation (SIMD) measure, using SIMD20, in Scotland.)	14%

In the 2024/25 academic year, the student body consisted of 16,945 students, composed of 12,535 undergraduates and 4,410 postgraduate students. The university is designated as a 'medium-tariff' institution, and was previously 'high-tariff', by the Department for Education, with the average undergraduate entrant to the university in recent years amassing between 121 and 132 UCAS Tariff points in their top three pre-university qualifications – the equivalent of BBB to AAB at A-Level. Based on 2022/23 HESA entry standards data published in domestic league tables, which include a broad range of qualifications beyond the top three exam grades, the average student at the University of East Anglia achieved 135 points.

In 2024, the ratio of applications to acceptances was 4.10 to 1. In 2020/21, 8% of UEA's undergraduates were privately educated. In 2022/23, the student body was 58% female and 42% male. Additionally, in that academic year 84% of UEA students had come from the UK, 4% of students from the EU, and 12% of students were from outside the UK or EU.

=== Grade distribution and inflation ===
Data from the Higher Education Statistics Agency (HESA) showed that UEA has one of the highest proportions of First Class and Upper Second Class degrees achieved by students with more than Oxford and Cambridge. Only three universities in the United Kingdom have been awarded a higher proportion of First Class degrees than UEA between the academic years 2014/15 and 2017/18. There is a concern about grade inflation with the degrees awarded by English universities, with the University of East Anglia awarding 35.7% First Class degrees, 52.1% Upper Seconds (2:1), 11.2% Lower Seconds (2:2) and 1% Third Class degrees in 2016/17.

=== Rankings and reputation ===
Rankings
National rankings
- Complete (2027): 34
- Guardian (2027): 86
- Times / Sunday Times (2027): 40

Global rankings
- ARWU (2026): 301–400
- QS (2027): 381=
- THE (2026): 251–300

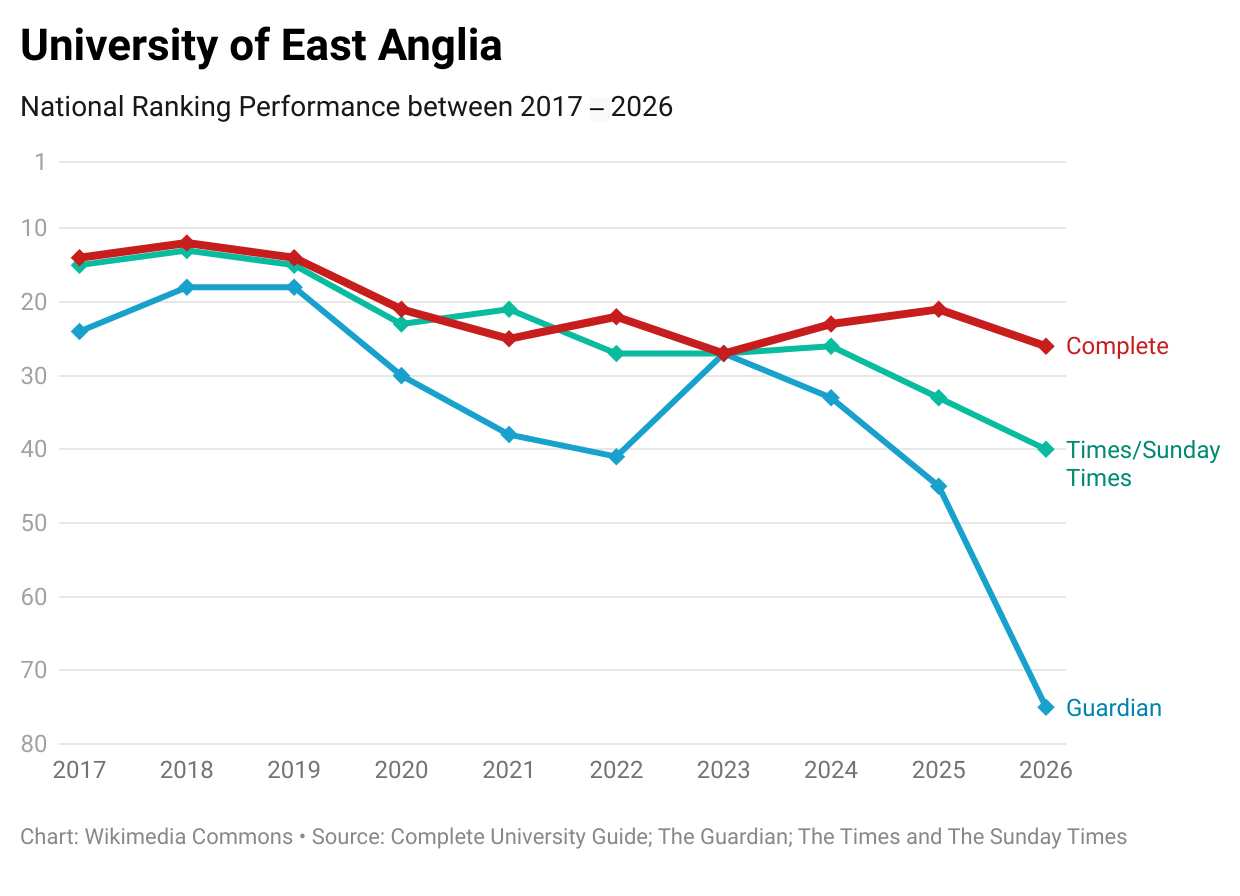
UEA's national league table performance

The results of the 2021 Research Excellence Framework, published on 12 May 2022, showed that over 91% of the university's research activity was deemed to be "world leading" or "internationally excellent" with more than 47% having the highest category of 4* of World Leading Research, significantly higher than the national average of 41%. UEA was ranked thirteenth in the UK for the quality of its research outputs and twentieth overall amongst all mainstream British institutions – a rise of nine places since the last assessment in 2014. The university ranks in the Top 1% worldwide according to the Times Higher Education world rankings, and within the world Top 100 for research excellence in the Leiden Ranking, with UEA "often out-performing Russell Group universities". In 2022, UEA was ranked within the Top 50 globally for research citations by the Times Higher Education world rankings. In 2012, UEA was named the tenth best university in the world under 50-years-old and third best within the UK. In 2017, the university was rated "gold" by the Teaching Excellence Framework (TEF) for quality of teaching. In the 2023 TEF assessment, UEA's award was revised to "silver".

In national league tables, UEA has been ranked within the Top 20 by The Times, The Sunday Times, The Guardian and The Complete University Guide. In April 2013, the university was ranked first for student experience according to the Times Higher Education Magazine. In the 2014 National Student Survey, UEA was jointly classified with the University of Exeter, the University of Law and the University of Buckingham as the UK's second most successful university in terms of student ratings, with a learner satisfaction level of 92%. In 2020, UEA had a joint third position with Exeter University on the survey with a score of 91%, ahead of Oxford and Cambridge. The 2024 survey results featured comments from students noting university staff as "knowledgeable, passionate and supportive" with 100% positivity scores in certain subject areas such as Physics, Liberal Arts, and Chemistry. UEA was also ranked first nationally for graduate job prospects by students in the 2022 Student Crowd Survey, with several schools achieving a 100% score of graduates in employment in the 2023 HESA survey, including Norwich Medical School, the School of Chemistry, and the School of Social Work and Psychology.

== Organisation ==
=== Faculties and schools ===
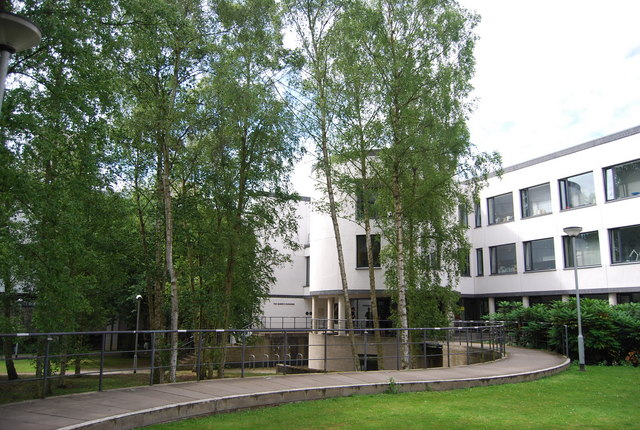
The Queen's Building

The university offers over 300 courses in its four faculties, which contain twenty-six schools of study:

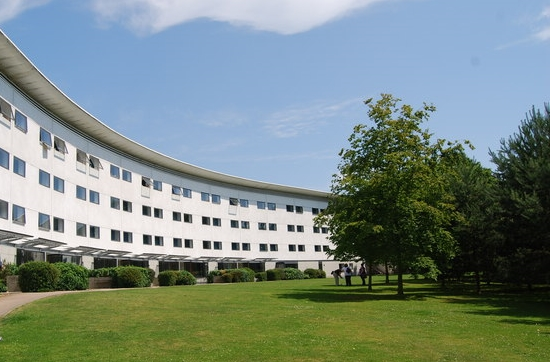
Constable Terrace

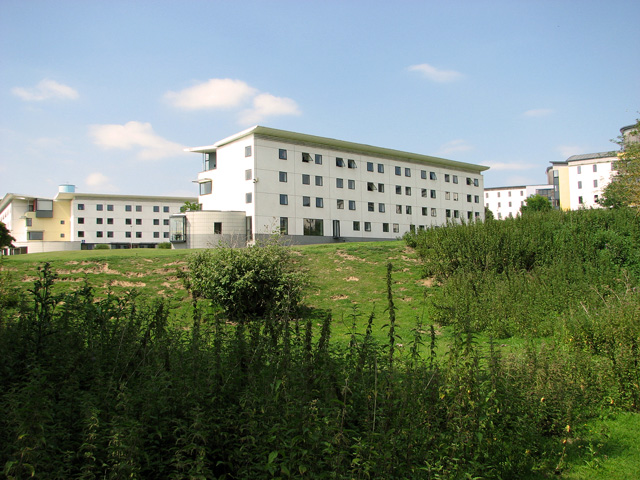
Nelson Court

==== Faculty of Arts and Humanities ====
- Media, Languages and Communication Studies
- History
- Interdisciplinary Institute for the Humanities
- Literature, Drama and Creative Writing
- Politics, Philosophy and Area Studies

==== Faculty of Medicine and Health Sciences ====
- Norwich Medical School
- Health Sciences

==== Faculty of Science ====
- Actuarial Sciences
- Biological Sciences
- Biomedical Sciences
- Biochemistry
- Chemistry
- Computing Sciences
- Engineering
- Environmental Sciences
- Geography
- Mathematics
- Natural Sciences
- Pharmacy
- Physics

==== Faculty of Social Sciences ====
- Economics
- Education and Lifelong Learning
- International Development
- UEA Law School
- Norwich Business School
- School of Social Work and Psychology

== Student life ==
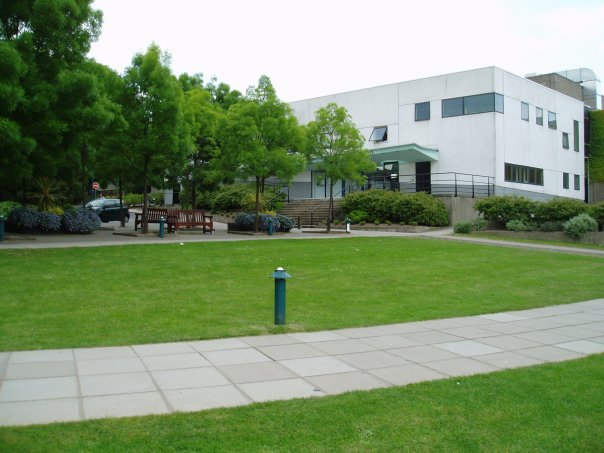
UEA Drama Studio

All students at the university and INTO UEA automatically become members of the union but do have the right to opt out of membership. Membership confers the ability to take part in the union's activities such as clubs and societies and being involved in the democratic processes of the union. The union is a democratic organisation run by its members via an elected student officer committee and student council. It is affiliated to the National Union of Students, and also campaigns on a wide range of issues, as directed by the democratic processes.

The UEA Student Union has over 200 clubs and societies; university sports teams include the Men's and Women's Football Clubs and Lacrosse Teams (UEA Eagles), a Korfball Team (UEA Tigers), a British Universities American Football League (BUAFC) Premier South Division American football Team (UEA Pirates), and the cheer dance and stunt society (UEA Angels). The UEA Media Collective encompasses the free student newspaper Concrete, UEA:TV (previously named Nexus UTV), and the student radio station Livewire 1350AM. Norwich Medical School also has various active medical societies.

The UEA Student Union hosted events like Pimp My Barrow, which was an annual fundraising event for the Big C Cancer Charity and ran from 2006 to 2019. Students acquired a wheelbarrow and decorated it in accordance with their team's theme. They were then paraded around the local area, via a selection of local pubs and with a wheelbarrow race through Eaton Park. The annual Derby Day sports event involves UEA taking on the University of Essex in approximately 40 sports. UEA won the Derby Day trophy from 2013 to 2018. The UEA Student Union organises gigs and club nights at the Lower Common Room in Union House. The union also runs the Waterfront venue, off campus in Norwich's King Street, which was awarded a Council for Advancement and Support of Education (CASE) award in 2018 for engagement with alumni. Acts that have performed at these venues include Captain Beefheart, The Cure, Coldplay, Pere Ubu, U2, Haim, The Smiths, Sparks, Red Hot Chili Peppers, Radiohead and Iron Maiden. The union operates a number of other services within Union House which underwent a refurbishment in 2015 after a £6m investment.

== Notable people ==
=== Alumni ===
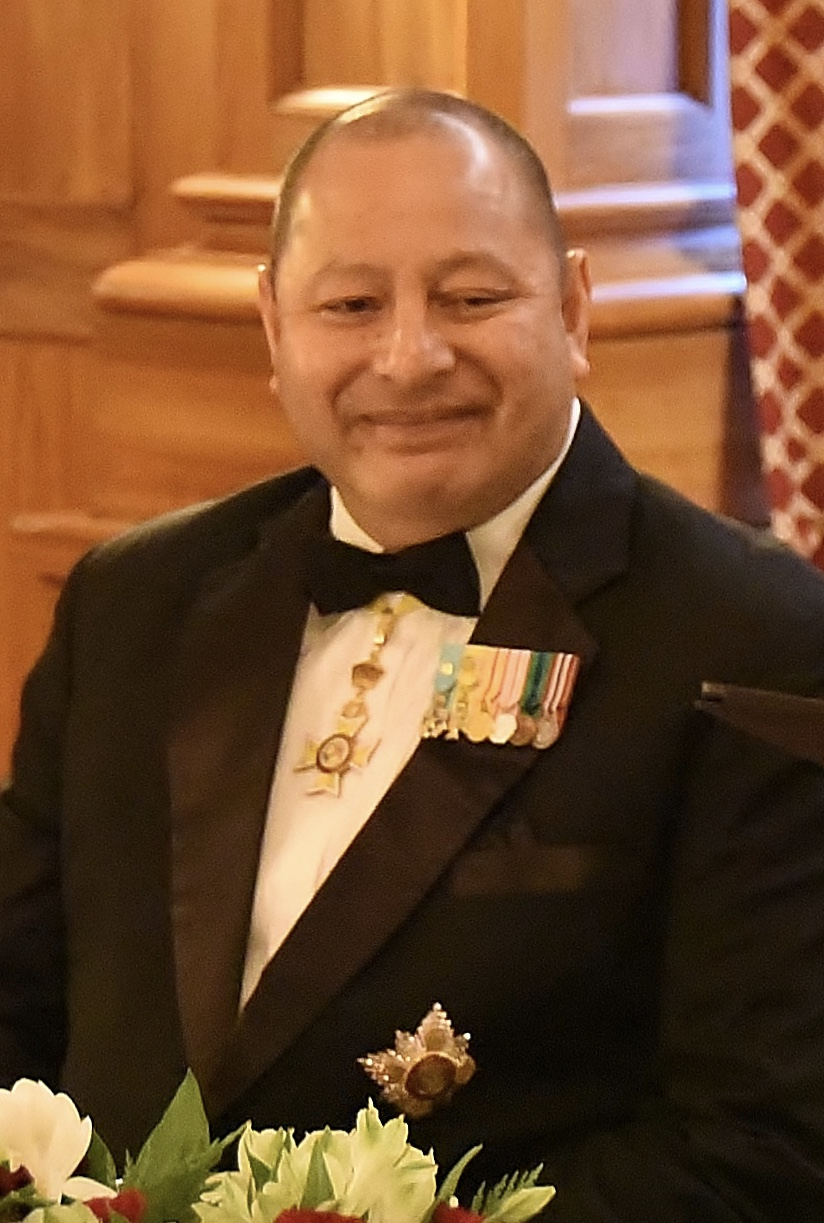
King of Tonga, Tupou VI (BA, 1980)

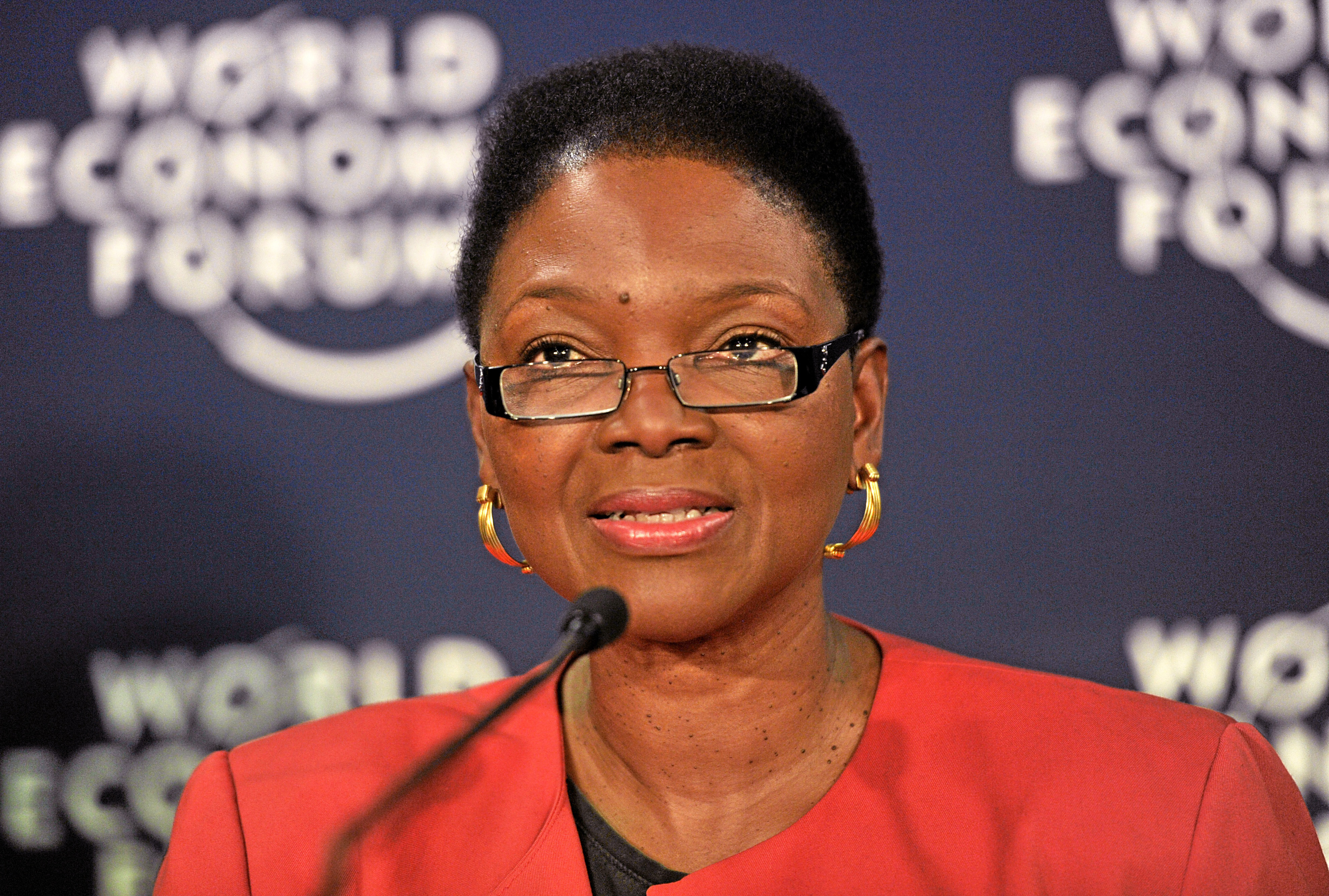
Master of University College, Oxford, Baroness Amos (Applied Research in Education, 1978)

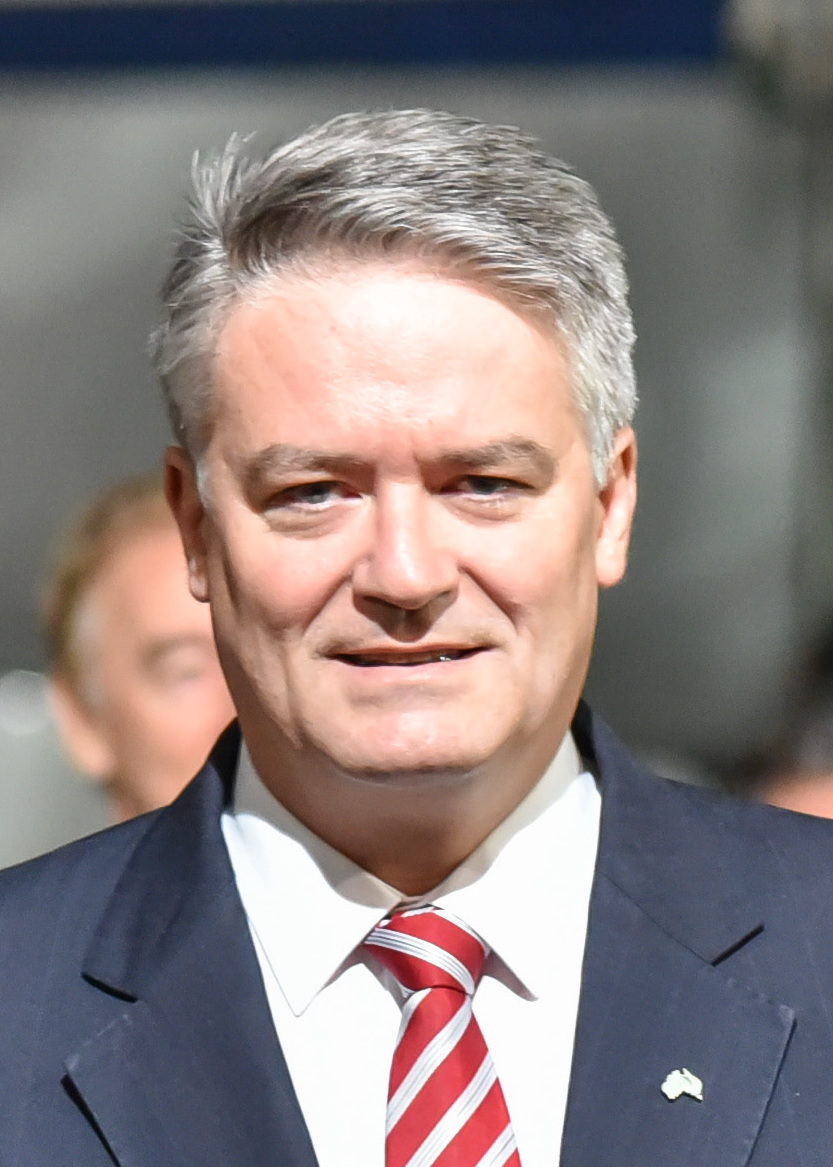
Secretary-General of the OECD, Mathias Cormann (Law, 1994)

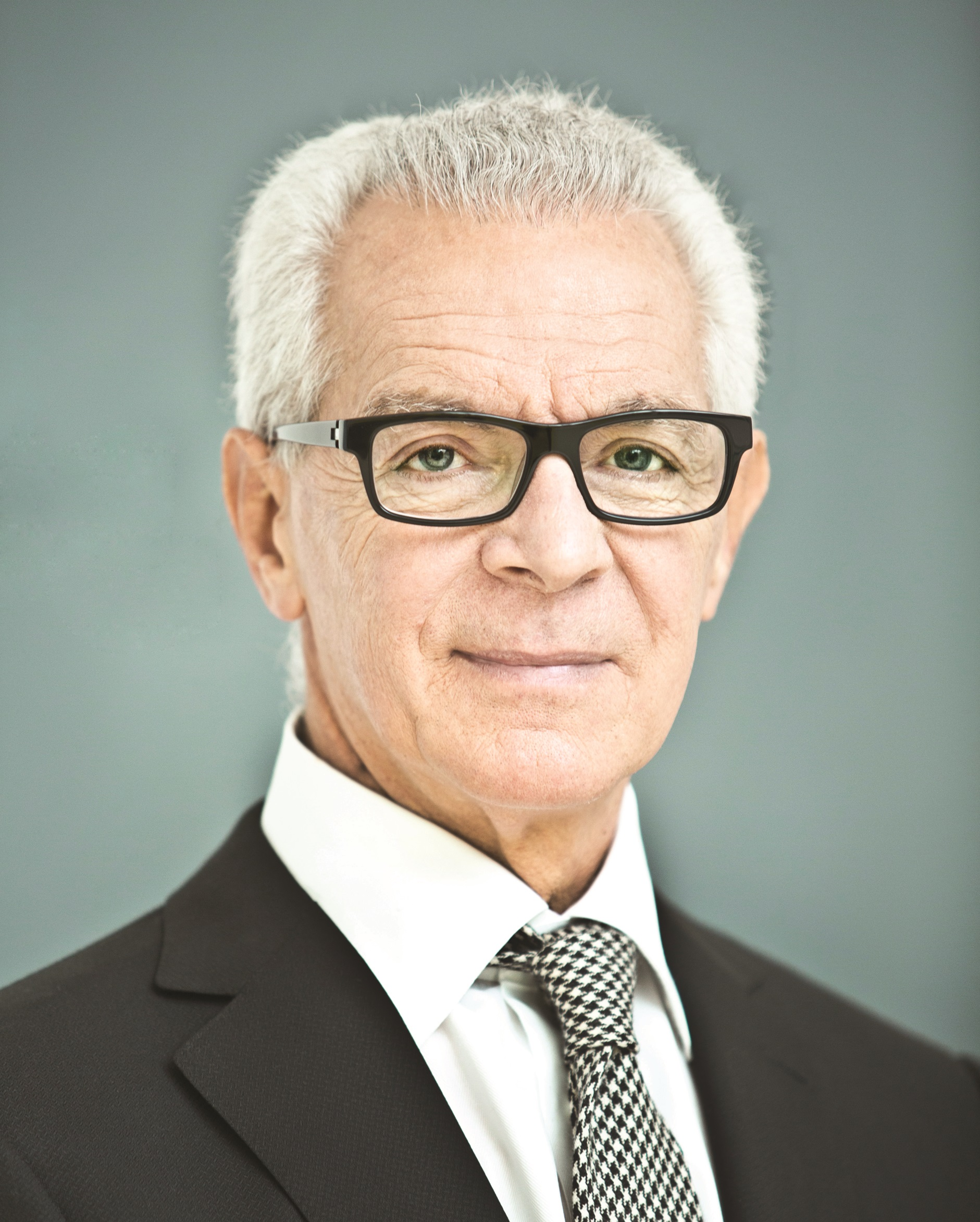
Argentine billionaire businessman, Eduardo Costantini (MA, 1975)

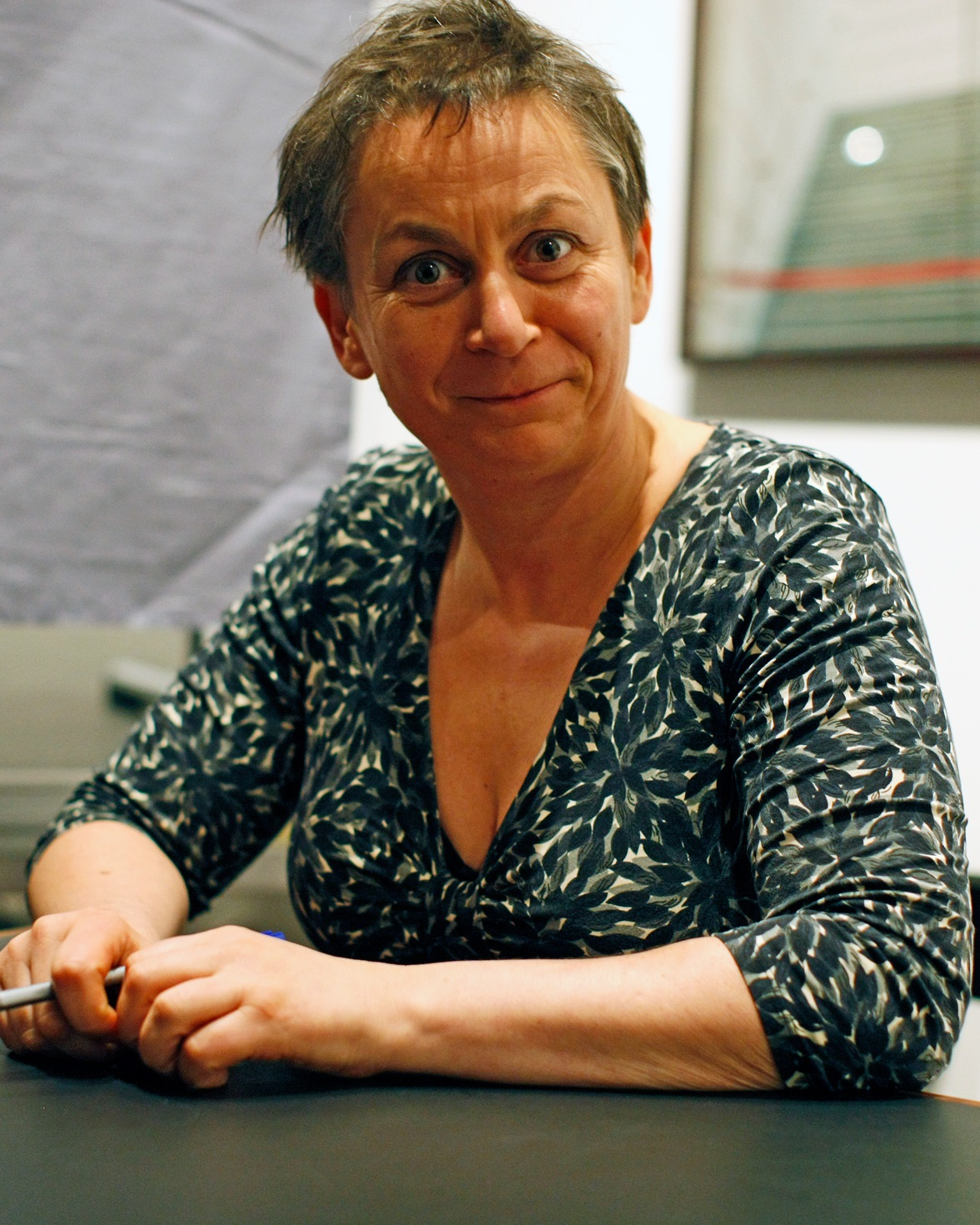
2007 Booker Prize winner, Anne Enright (MA, 1988)

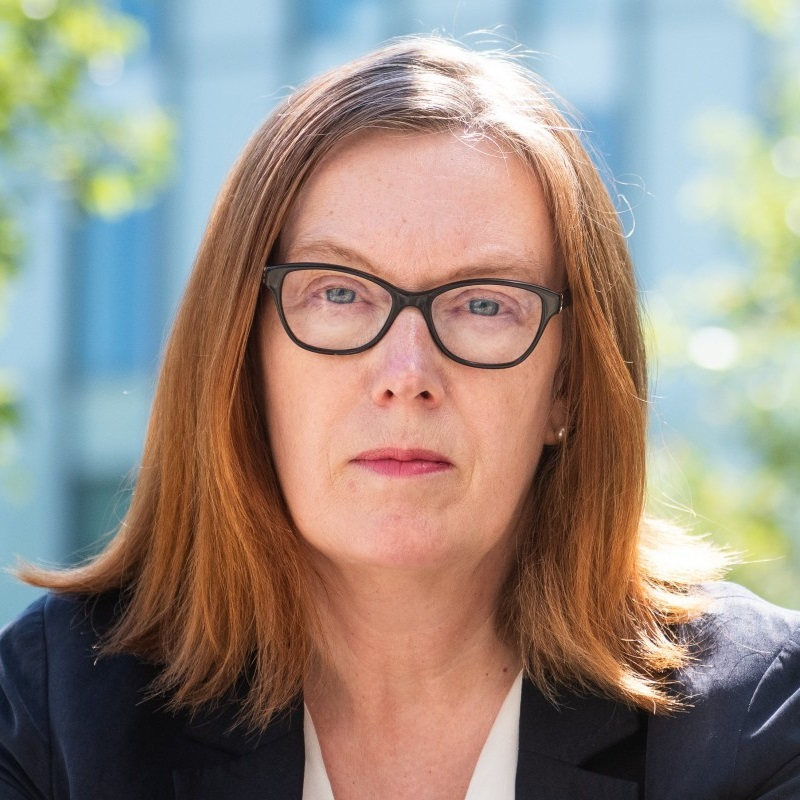
Vaccinologist, Dame Sarah Gilbert (BSc, 1983), was the project lead on the Oxford–AstraZeneca COVID-19 vaccine

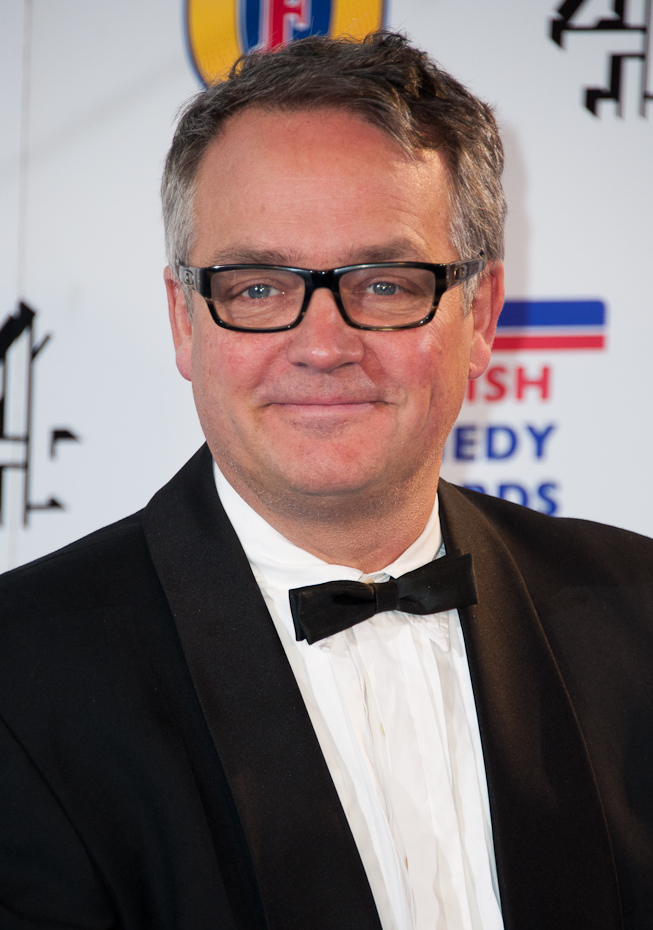
Comedian Charlie Higson (BA, 1980)

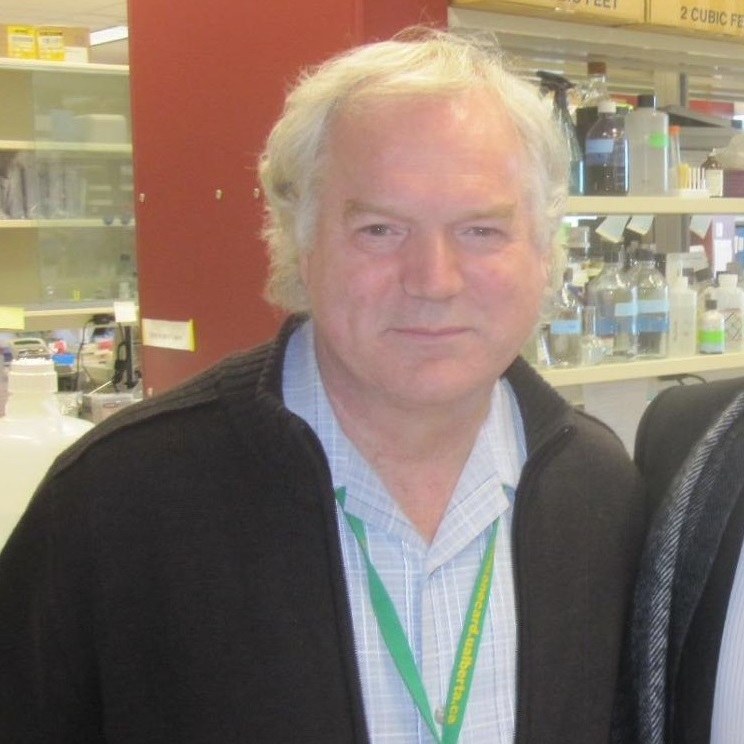
2020 Nobel Prize in Medicine laureate, Sir Michael Houghton (BSc, 1972), co-discovered Hepatitis C in 1989

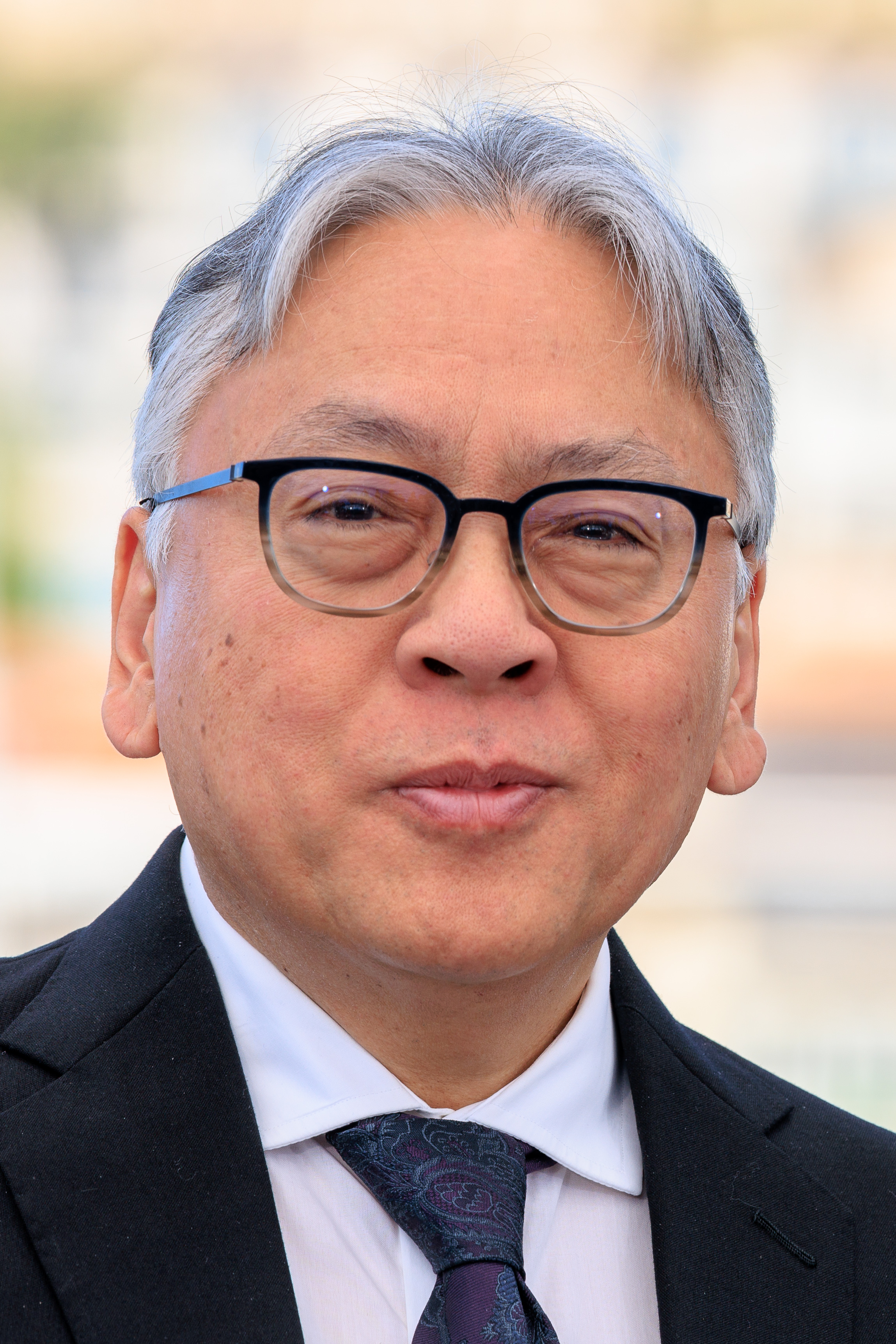
2017 Nobel Prize in Literature and 1989 Booker Prize winner, Sir Kazuo Ishiguro (MA, 1980)

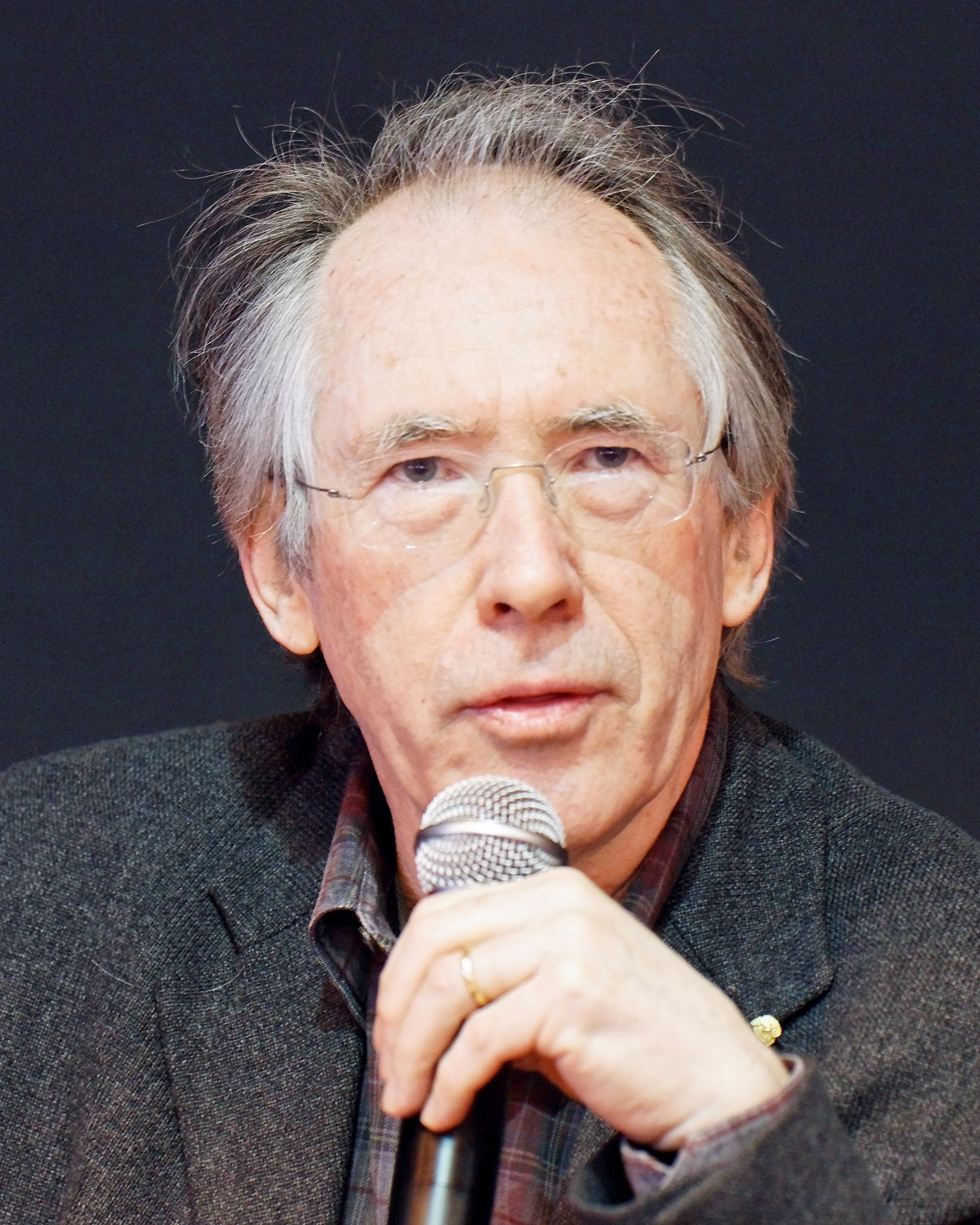
1998 Booker Prize winner, Ian McEwan (MA, 1971)

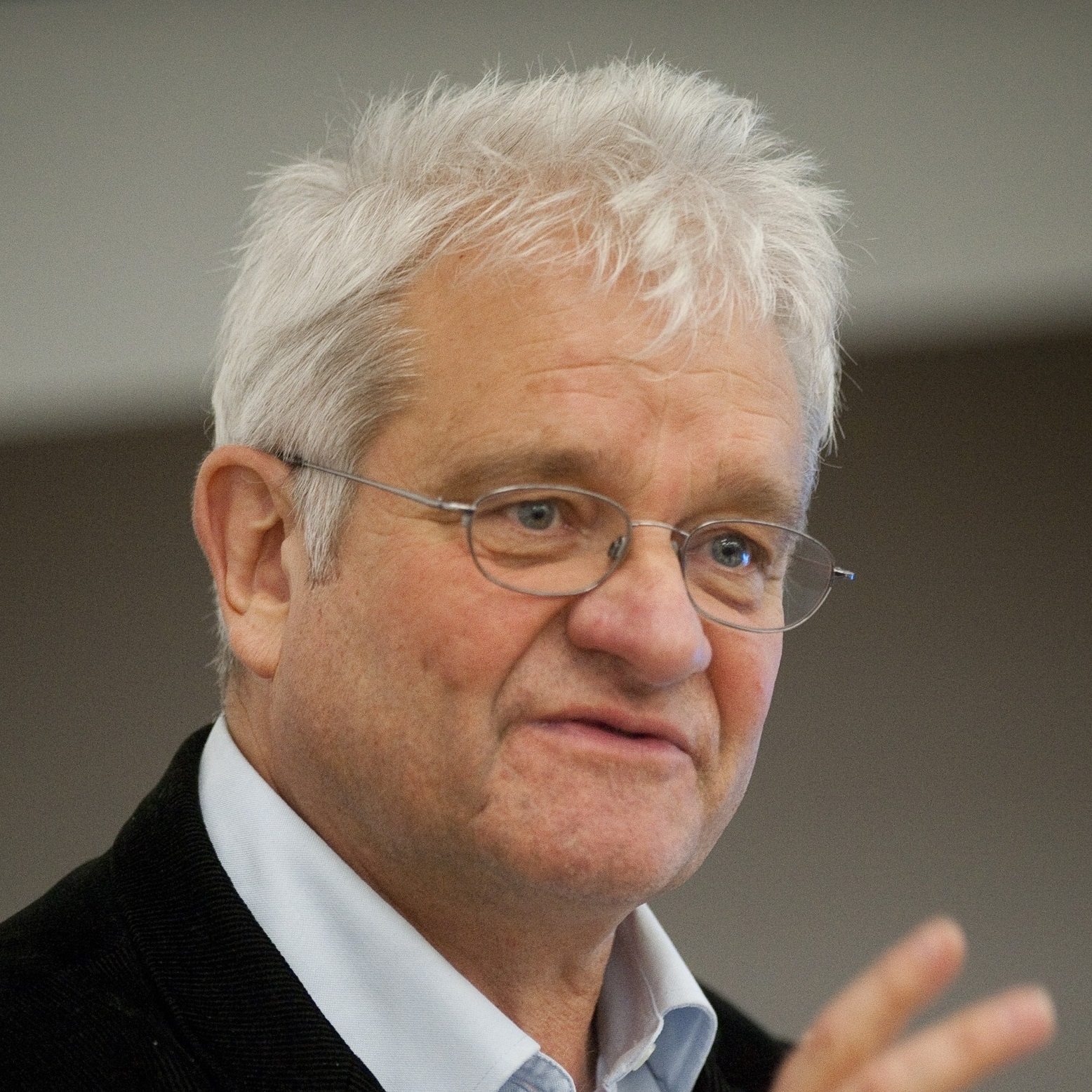
2001 Nobel Prize in Medicine laureate and President of the Royal Society, Sir Paul Nurse (PhD, 1973)

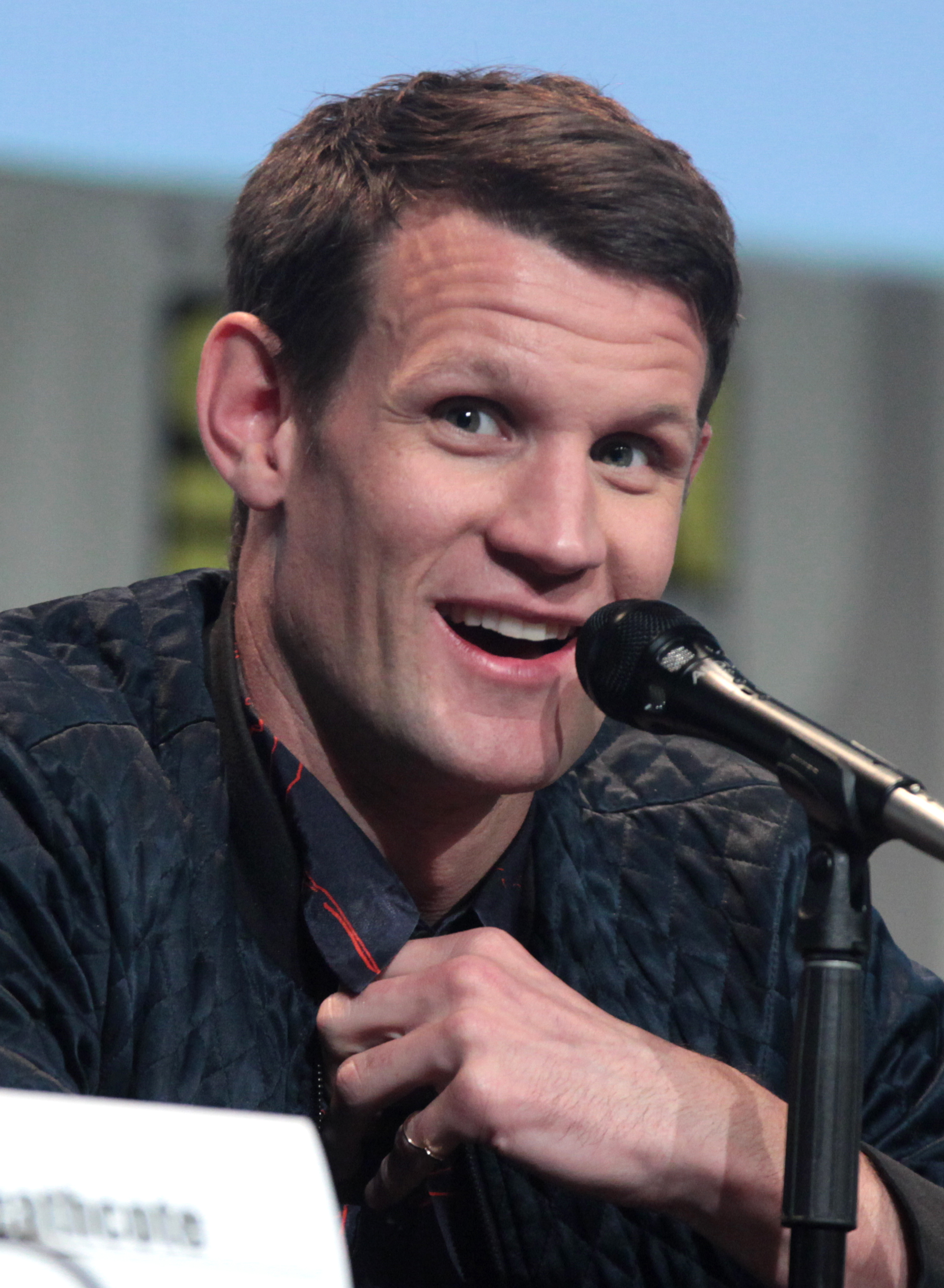
Actor Matt Smith (BA, 2005)

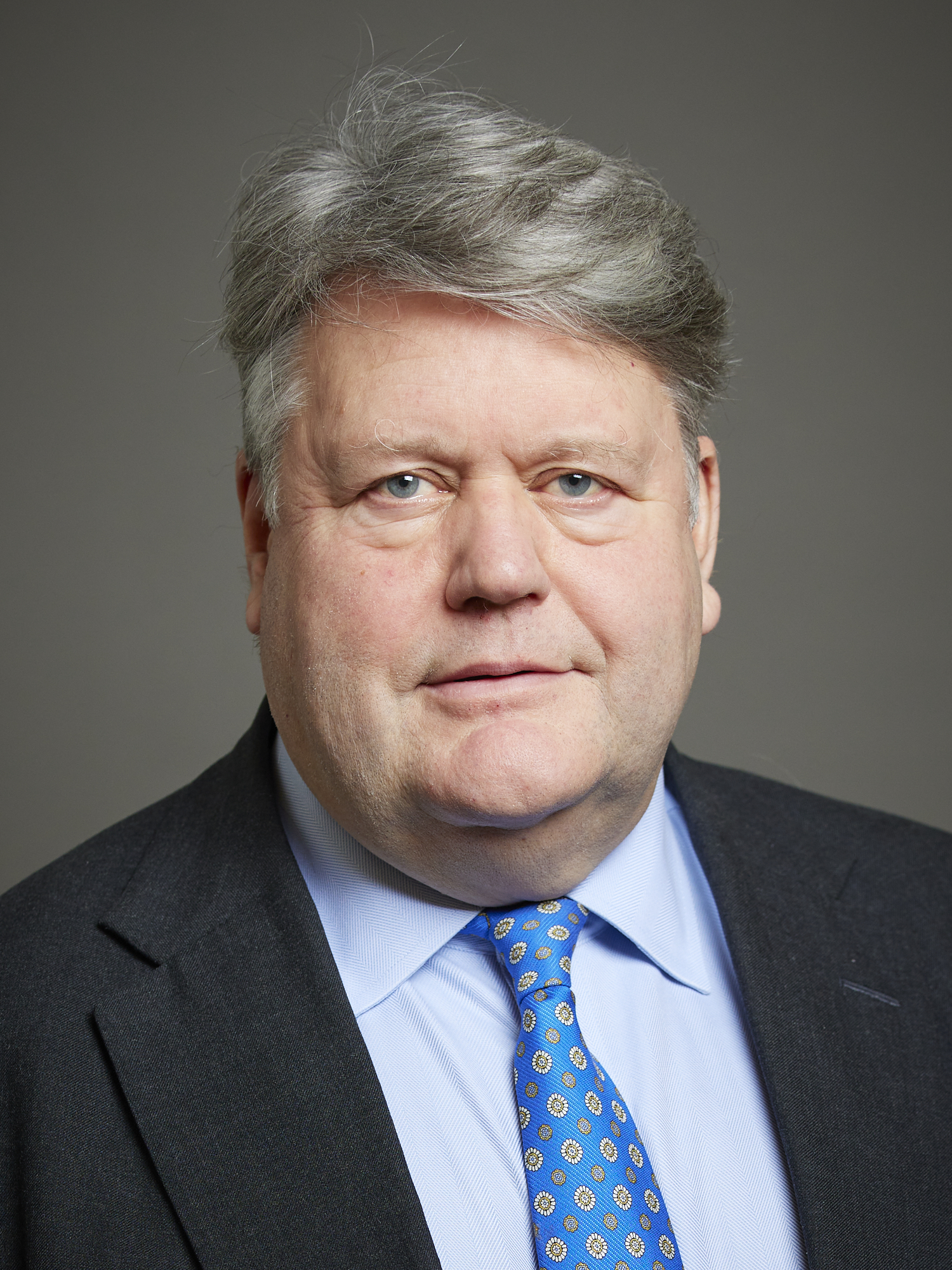
Former Leader of the House of Lords, Lord Strathclyde (BA, 1982)

=== Chancellors ===
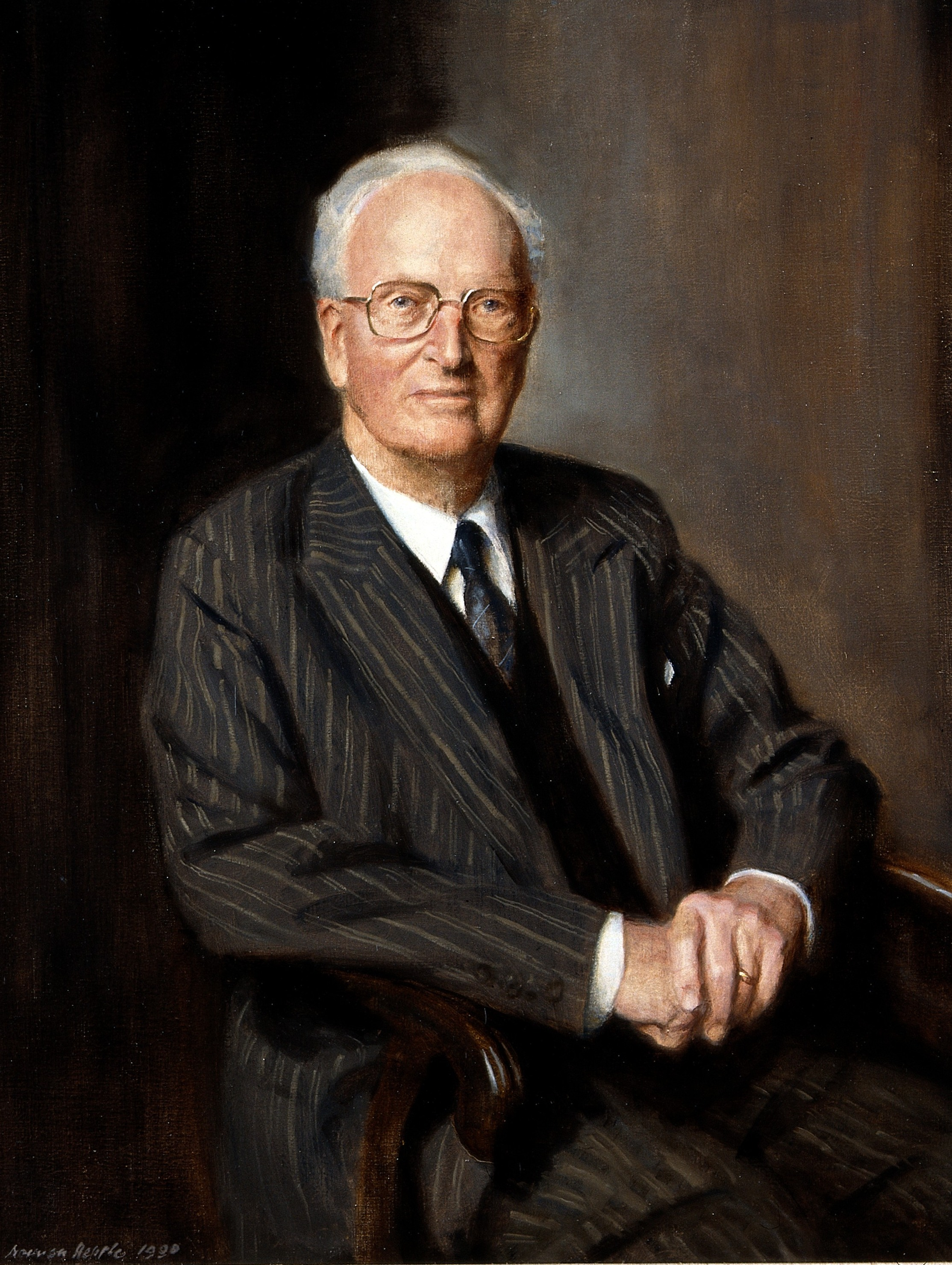
Chancellor from 1965 to 1984 Oliver Franks, Baron Franks

- Harold Mackintosh, 1st Viscount Mackintosh of Halifax (1962–1964)
- Oliver Franks, Baron Franks (1965–1984)
- Owen Chadwick (1984–1994)
- Sir Geoffrey Allen (1994–2003)
- Sir Brandon Gough (2003–2012)
- Dame Rose Tremain (2013–2016)
- Dame Karen Jones (2016–2024)
- Dame Jenny Abramsky (2024–present)

=== Vice-Chancellors ===
- Frank Thistlethwaite (1961–1980)
- Sir Michael Thompson (1980–1986)
- Derek Burke (1987–1995)
- Dame Elizabeth Esteve-Coll (1995–1997)
- Vincent Watts (1997–2002)
- Sir David Eastwood (2002–2006)
- Bill MacMillan (2006–2009)
- Edward Acton (2009–2014)
- David Richardson (2014–2023)
- David Maguire (2023–present)

== See also ==
- Armorial of British universities
- East Anglia
- List of universities in the United Kingdom
- List of University of East Anglia alumni
- Plate glass university
