= David Richardson (biochemist) =

British academic (born 1964)

Professor David Richardson

Vice-Chancellor of the University of East Anglia
- In office 2014–2023
- Chancellor: Rose Tremain; Karen Jones
- Preceded by: Edward Acton
- Succeeded by: Christine Bovis-Cnossen

Personal details
- Born: August 1964 (age 62) Whitley Bay, England, United Kingdom
- Education: University of Keele (BSc); University of Birmingham (PhD)
- Profession: Biochemist

David John Richardson (born August 1964) is a British academic who was formerly the Vice-Chancellor of the University of East Anglia. As a result of the financial crisis that engulfed the university in early 2023, under his management, he resigned from the position on 27 February 2023, effective immediately, with Deputy Vice-Chancellor and Provost Christine Bovis-Cnossen taking over as acting Vice-Chancellor.

== Biography ==
Richardson was born in Whitley Bay near Newcastle upon Tyne. He was educated at the University of Keele (BSc, Biochemistry) and the University of Birmingham (PhD, 1988), and undertook post-doctoral research at the University of Oxford from 1988 to 1991.

Richardson joined the University of East Anglia as a lecturer in 1991, and became a Professor in 2001. His research group in UEA's School of Biological Sciences is involved in investigating bacteria. In 1999, he was awarded the Society for General Microbiology Fleming Medal, and is a recipient of the Royal Society Wolfson Research Merit Award. He has an h-index of 83.

David Richardson was appointed Deputy Vice-Chancellor of the University of East Anglia in 2012 before becoming Vice-Chancellor in September 2014. Other positions he has held at the university include Dean of the Faculty of Science and Pro-Vice-Chancellor for Research, Enterprise and Engagement.

During his time as Vice Chancellor Professor Richardson has worked on a Universities UK taskforce focused on stamping out harassment on campus, and was particularly vocal in promoting the Higher Education case for the UK remaining in the EU in the 2016 EU Referendum.

Richardson's other roles include chair of the Norwich Research Park board and President of the Royal Norfolk Agricultural Association. He is a Non-Executive Director of the Norfolk and Norwich University Hospital Board of Directors.

== Personal life ==
Richardson is married with two children in their twenties. His interests include following the Norwich City and Newcastle United F.C. football teams.
