= UEA School of Social Work and Psychology =

English school department

The School of Social Work and Psychology is a department of the University of East Anglia, Norwich, England.

== History ==
The origins of the School can be traced back to 1975 when Professor Martin Davies was brought from Manchester to design and launch a new Graduate Program in Social Work. As a result, UEA welcomed its first 12 social work students in 1976. The School grew steadily, originally operating as a sector of the School of Economic and Social Studies. A new research degree was launched in 1983, and the School's first doctoral student graduated in 1984. In the late 1980s there began a series of collaborations with local authority and probation departments in East Anglia which lay the foundations for a burgeoning program of post-qualifying courses in social work.

In 1993 the School performed a key role in the development of health studies at UEA in the formation of the School of Health and Social Work. To support the development the Elizabeth Fry Building was built, which has been occupied by all social work and psychosocial sciences staff and students since January 1995. The School of Social Work became an entity in its own right in 1997 and was renamed the School of Social Work and Psychosocial Sciences in 2000, changing to the School of Social Work and Psychology in 2008 in recognition of the British Psychological Society approval of the BSc Psychology (formerly psychosocial sciences) degree program. The School is also home to the Centre for Research on Children and Families. Launched in 1996, the Centre provides a focus for internationally recognized research in this field. In 2006 the Centre hosted the Second International Conference on Adoption Research and the First International Conference on Children and Divorce, attracting delegates from all around the world.

In 1989, 1992, 1996 and most recently in December 2001, the School's research was recognized by the Higher Education Funding Council when social work at UEA was top-rated 5 on each occasion in the Research Assessment Exercise (RAE). External funding for research has been awarded by a range of organizations including the UK and Welsh Government, Economic and Social Research Council, NSPCC, Nuffield Foundation, and the Big Lottery.

The quality of the teaching received by social work students was also given the highest possible ranking by the Funding Council. This was consolidated in the first ever National Student Survey in 2005 where students on the School's undergraduate program ranked gave the course the best ranking for courses of its kind in the whole UK, a result which was repeated in the 2006 and 2007 National Student Survey.

The undergraduate Psychology program (formerly Psychosocial Sciences) was launched in 1997, with the first cohort of students graduating in July 2000. The program provided a new undergraduate degree focusing on the scientific study of human relations in a social context. The program was able to draw on the teaching and research skills of existing members of faculty and to attract new appointments to strengthen the School's expertise in psychology. The BSc Psychology at UEA achieved accreditation from the British Psychological Society in 2008. In 2012, the School was split to form two separate Schools: the School of Psychology and the School of Social Work.

== Notable alumni ==
- June Thoburn, Emeritus Professor
