= UEA Broad =

Lake in Norfolk, England

Coordinates: 52.6183°N 1.2400°E

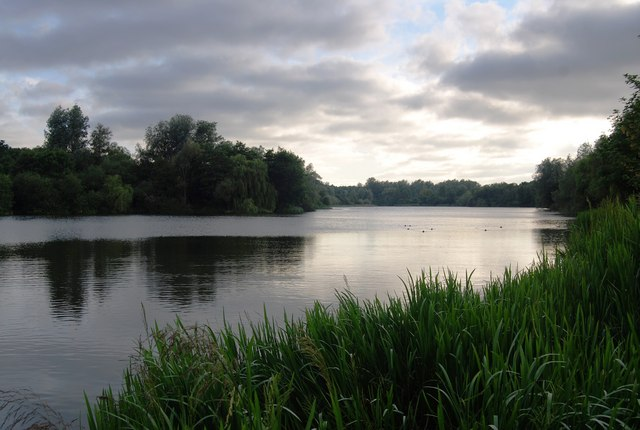
UEA Broad

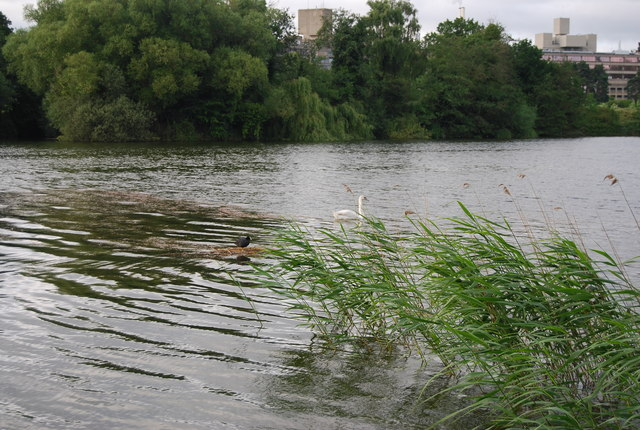
Birds on the Broad

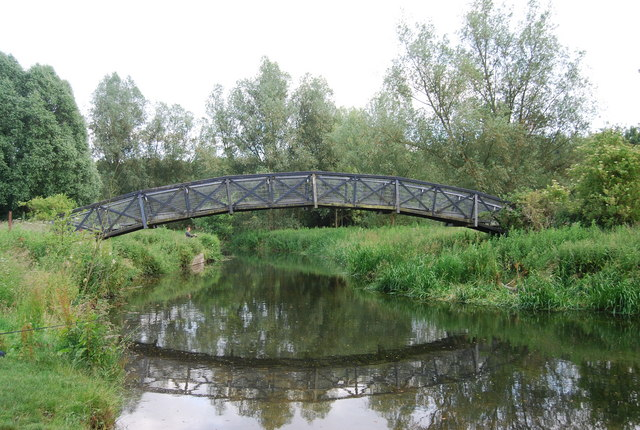
Footbridge across the River Yare

UEA Broad is an area of open water that neighbours the University of East Anglia, from which it gets its name. It is a part of The Broads in Norfolk.

== Creation ==
UEA Broad was developed by Atlas Aggregates in conjunction with the university between August 1973 and June 1978. It has an area of 7.8 hectares (19 acres), with sides that slope very steeply down to a maximum depth of 6 metres (20 ft), which constrains it as a wildlife habitat. It is one of the few Broads produced by gravel extraction rather than peat digging. There is still machinery under the water.

== Wildlife ==
The Broad is particularly well known for its bird life, with great crested grebes, kingfishers, herons, swans, sedge warblers and cuckoos a common sight.

It is also well stocked with carp and commonly used for fishing with platforms positioned at regular intervals round the edge.

Non-native terrapins have also been spotted at the edge of the water.

== Amenities ==
While in the past the lake was used for windsurfing by university students, health and safety concerns have put an end to this practice.

Fishing and viewing platforms are located around the edges of the Broad, along with several pieces from the nearby Sainsbury Centre for Visual Arts's Sculpture Park.

The length of the lake on the northern side hosts several barbeque stands available for use by students and staff of the university. The favoured one lies next to a sandy area of the shoreline often known as "The Beach", where seagulls and ducks often congregate to be fed.
