= David Maguire =

British University Vice-Chancellor and Geographer

David John Maguire (born 22 August 1958) is a British-American academic and IT executive currently serving as the Vice-Chancellor of the University of East Anglia (UEA). Formerly he was the Vice-Chancellor of the Universities of Dundee, Greenwich and Sussex, and a senior executive at Esri Inc, California for 13 years.

== Early life ==
Maguire was born on 22 August 1958 in Lancaster, Lancashire and educated at Lancaster Royal Grammar School. He studied biology and geography at the University of Exeter, graduating in 1979, and completed a PhD in geography at the University of Bristol in 1983.

== Career ==
The main body of Maguire’s career has been spent working in the field of Geographic Information Systems both in academia and at Esri (Environmental Systems Research Institute) in the UK and US. His main contributions have been: lead editor of the major two volume definitive history of the field Geographical Information Systems: Principles and Applications (edited with Michael Goodchild and David Rhind in 1991); the four editions of the leading student text Geographic Information Science and Systems (co-authored with Paul Longley, Michael Goodchild and David Rhind, Fourth Edition 2015) and as contributor to the development of the Esri product strategy (along with Jack Dangermond, Scott Morehouse and Clint Brown) including ArcGIS 8, 9 and 10.

Maguire has served on several boards including as Chair of Jisc, from 2015-21.

He led the national review of Technology Enhanced Learning during Covid that resulted in the report Learning and Teaching Reimagined: a new dawn for higher education? (Nov 2020).

He has served as a Vice-Chancellor for over 10 years, mainly at the University of Greenwich. More recently he has had briefer spells as Vice-Chancellor at the Universities of Dundee, Sussex and, currently UEA.

== Honours ==
Maguire was elected Fellow of the Royal Geographical Society in 1998 and Principal Fellow of the Higher Education Academy in 2016 based on his contribution to Technology Enhanced Learning. He received a Doctor honoris causa from the University of Agronomic Sciences and Veterinary Medicine of Bucharest in 2009.
