= Frank Thistlethwaite =

English academic (1915–2003)

Frank Thistlethwaite

Frank Thistlethwaite CBE (24 July 1915 – 17 February 2003) was an English academic who served as the first vice-chancellor of the University of East Anglia.

== Early life ==
Thistlethwaite was born on 24 July 1915 at 11 Powell Street, Burnley, Lancashire, the elder son of Lee Thistlethwaite (1885–1973), cotton cloth merchant and manufacturer, and his wife Florence Nightingale née Thornber (1892–1983), youngest child of Sharp Thornber (1858–1933), cotton manufacturer, alderman and J.P., and Florence Nightingale (m. 1883; 1859–1917). He was initially educated at Burnley Grammar School, before attending Bootham School, York, and then St John's College, Cambridge (MA), and at the University of Minnesota.

== Career ==
Thistlethwaite served in the RAF 1941–45, during which time he was seconded to work for the War Cabinet 1942–45. A fellow of St John's College, Cambridge, Thistlethwaite served as a lecturer in the Faculty of Economics and Politics at the University of Cambridge from 1949 to 1961. He was founding chairman of the British Association for American Studies (1955–59). He became the first vice-chancellor of the University of East Anglia in 1961 and remained the post until 1980. He was appointed a CBE in 1979.

== Publications ==
- The Great Experiment: An Introduction to the History of the American People (1955)
- The Anglo-American Connection in the Early Nineteenth Century (1958)
- Dorset Pilgrims: The Story of West Country Puritans who went to New England in the 17th Century (1989)
- A Lancashire Family Inheritance (1996)
- Our War 1938–45 (1997)
