= Pimp My Barrow =

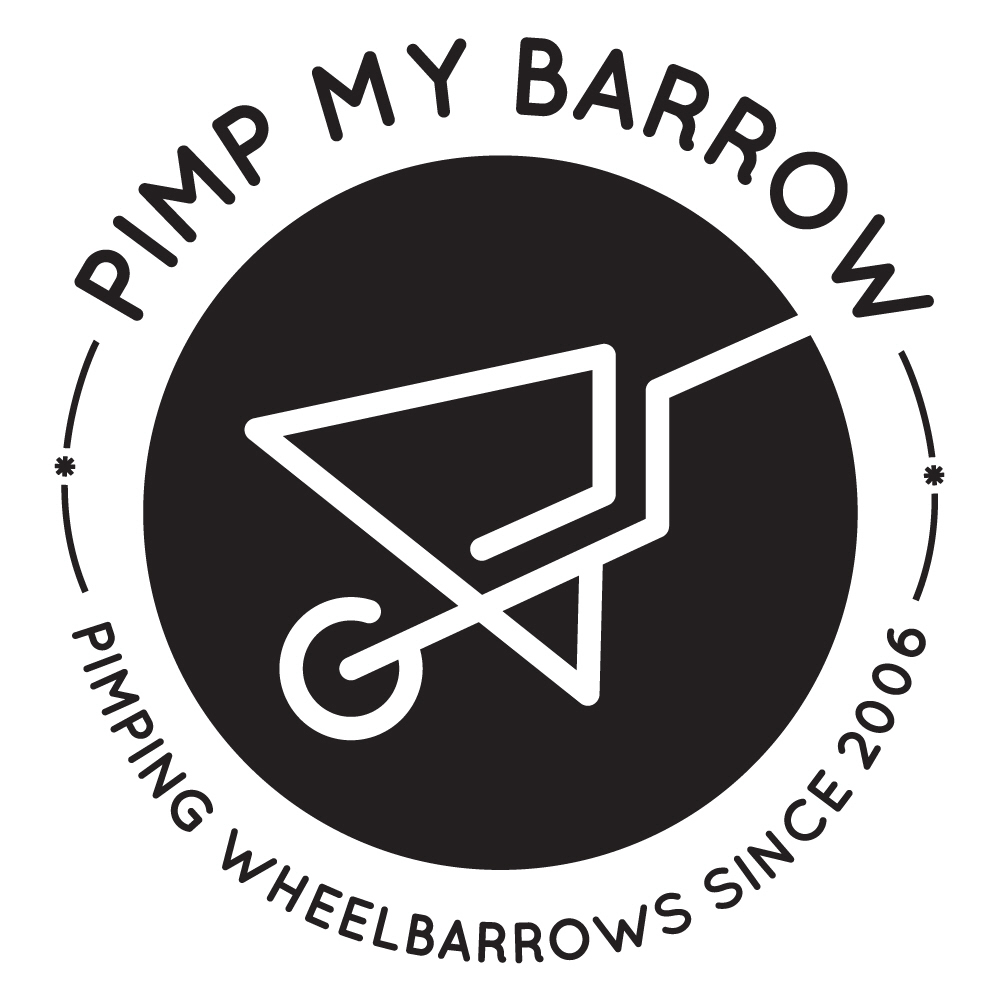
Pimp My Barrow is a registered trademark

Pimp My Barrow was a charity event established by Paul Wheeler and Thomas Tapper in 2006 which ran every year until 2019 at the University of East Anglia in Norwich, UK. Several other successful events have also taken place in Suffolk and Cambridge.

Students acquire a wheelbarrow and decorate it in accordance with their team's theme. The day commences with drinking and music in the UEA square. Barrows are then paraded around the local area, via a selection of local pubs and with a wheelbarrow race through Eaton Park.

During the time the event ran at UEA, entry fees and donations on the day from members of the public totalled almost £80k. All of which was donated to The Big C Cancer charity based in Norfolk.

In March 2012 the founders of Pimp My Barrow offered the rights to manage the Norwich event to the Union of UEA Students at the University of East Anglia. This agreement required the University to uphold the ethos of previous events and continue to operate for a charitable cause.

Pimp My Barrow is a registered trademark owned by founders Paul Wheeler and Thomas Tapper

== Sources ==
- Lowthorpe, Shawn (4 June 2011). "Picture gallery: Nearly 2,000 students take part in UEA pimp my barrow event around Norwich". Norwich Evening News. Archived from the original on 9 June 2011.
- "Council backs Pimp My Barrow event". Ipswich Borough Council. 6 February 2012. Archived from the original on 4 September 2012.
