= Bill MacMillan (academic) =

Bill MacMillan (born 1950) is a British academic and former Vice-Chancellor of the University of East Anglia.

He was educated at the University of Bristol where he graduated with a first class undergraduate degree in Civil Engineering and earned his PhD in Economic Geography. Prior to being appointed Vice-Chancellor of the University of East Anglia in 2006, he worked as an academic at the University of Kent, the University of Amsterdam, and at the University of Oxford where he became a Fellow of Hertford College, and a Pro-Vice-Chancellor of the University. He stepped down from his position as Vice-Chancellor of University of East Anglia in 2009.
