= Brandon Gough =

University chancellor (1937 - 2012)

Sir Brandon Gough DL

Chancellor of the University of East Anglia
- In office 2003–2012
- Preceded by: Sir Geoffrey Allen
- Succeeded by: Rose Tremain

Personal details
- Born: 8 October 1937
- Died: 26 April 2012 (aged 74)
- Education: Jesus College, Cambridge

Sir Brandon Charles Gough DL (8 October 1937 – 25 April 2012 ) was a British businessman, and Chancellor of the University of East Anglia.

Charles Brandon Gough was educated at Douai School and Jesus College, Cambridge, where he read natural sciences and law. He held chairmanships of Yorkshire Water, Coopers & Lybrand and De La Rue plc, and was chairman of the Higher Education Funding Council for England. He was knighted in 2002.
