= The Trick (film) =

2021 British film

- Directed by: Pip Broughton
- Country of origin: United Kingdom
- Original language: English

Production
- Producer: Adrian Bate
- Running time: 89 minutes

Original release
- Network: BBC One
- Release: 18 October 2021

The Trick is a 2021 British television film directed by Pip Broughton and produced by Adrian Bate. It aired on BBC One on 18 October 2021. The film is a dramatisation of the Climatic Research Unit email controversy.

== Plot summary ==
"The Trick" is a film based on the true story of the 2009 "Climategate" affair, where emails from climate scientist Phil Jones were hacked and used to undermine public confidence in climate change science. The film dramatizes the events surrounding the "Climategate" scandal and its impact on climate change research and policy.

Climategate was not so much a scandal about the relatively straightforward facts behind the science, but a crisis of communication. Hackers selectively released a series of emails which gave the false impression that scientists had manipulated climate data, which was not the case.

== Reviews ==
The drama "The Trick" struggles to balance explaining what happened in Climategate with hammering home an environmental message. The characters often feel like they are lecturing the audience rather than having natural conversations.

One review said that The drama fails to effectively dramatize the complex issues around Climategate and turn it into compelling television. Some reviewers described it as a "conspiracy thriller" and cautionary tale" while others said "it was not a thriller".

The performances, especially by Jason Watkins as Professor Jones and Victoria Hamilton as his wife, are strong. However, the characters often come across as less interesting than the scientific data itself.

== Cast ==
- Jason Watkins as Phil Jones
- Victoria Hamilton as Ruth Jones
- George MacKay as Sam Bowen
- Jerome Flynn as Neil Wallis
- Aneirin Hughes as Trevor Davies
- Adrian Edmondson as Edward Acton
- Pooky Quesnel as Stella Acton
- Tara Divina as DS Anita Suppiah
- Rhashan Stone as Gareth Ellman
- Justin Salinger as DSI Julian Gregory
- David Calder as Sir David King
- Andrew Dunn as Graham Stringer

== Reception ==
On the review aggregator website Rotten Tomatoes, there were four critics' reviews with an average rating of 60%. The Daily Telegraph's Anita Singh gave the film a rating of two out of five stars, concluding that the attempts to force the story to be a thriller fell flat. The Independent's Ed Cumming found the characters boring and also rated the film two out of five stars. The New Scientist's Elle Hunt wrote that the film was lacking in action, but felt that the filmmakers deserved kudos nonetheless for tackling such an important story.
