= Karen Jones =

British business executive (born 1956)

Dame Karen Jones DBE FRSA
- Born: Karen Elisabeth Dind Jones; 29 July 1956 (age 70); York, England
- Education: Mill Mount County Grammar School for Girls
- Alma mater: University of East Anglia; Wellesley College
- Occupation: Business executive
- Known for: Co-founder of Pelican Group Plc, owner of restaurant chains including Café Rouge, CEO of Spirit Group

Dame Karen Elisabeth Dind Jones DBE FRSA (born 29 July 1956) is a British business executive.

== Life and career ==
Jones was educated at the University of East Anglia (BA, 1978) and went on to study at Wellesley College, Massachusetts. She co-founded, and subsequently floated, The Pelican Group Plc, owner of a number of restaurant chains including Café Rouge. She was CEO of Spirit Group from 1999 to 2006, which was later purchased by Punch Taverns. She was appointed Chancellor of the University of East Anglia in 2016, and stepped down in 2024.

Having previously become Commander of the Order of the British Empire (CBE), she was appointed Dame Commander of the Order of the British Empire (DBE) in the 2022 Birthday Honours for services to business and the hospitality industry.
