= Mahnaz =

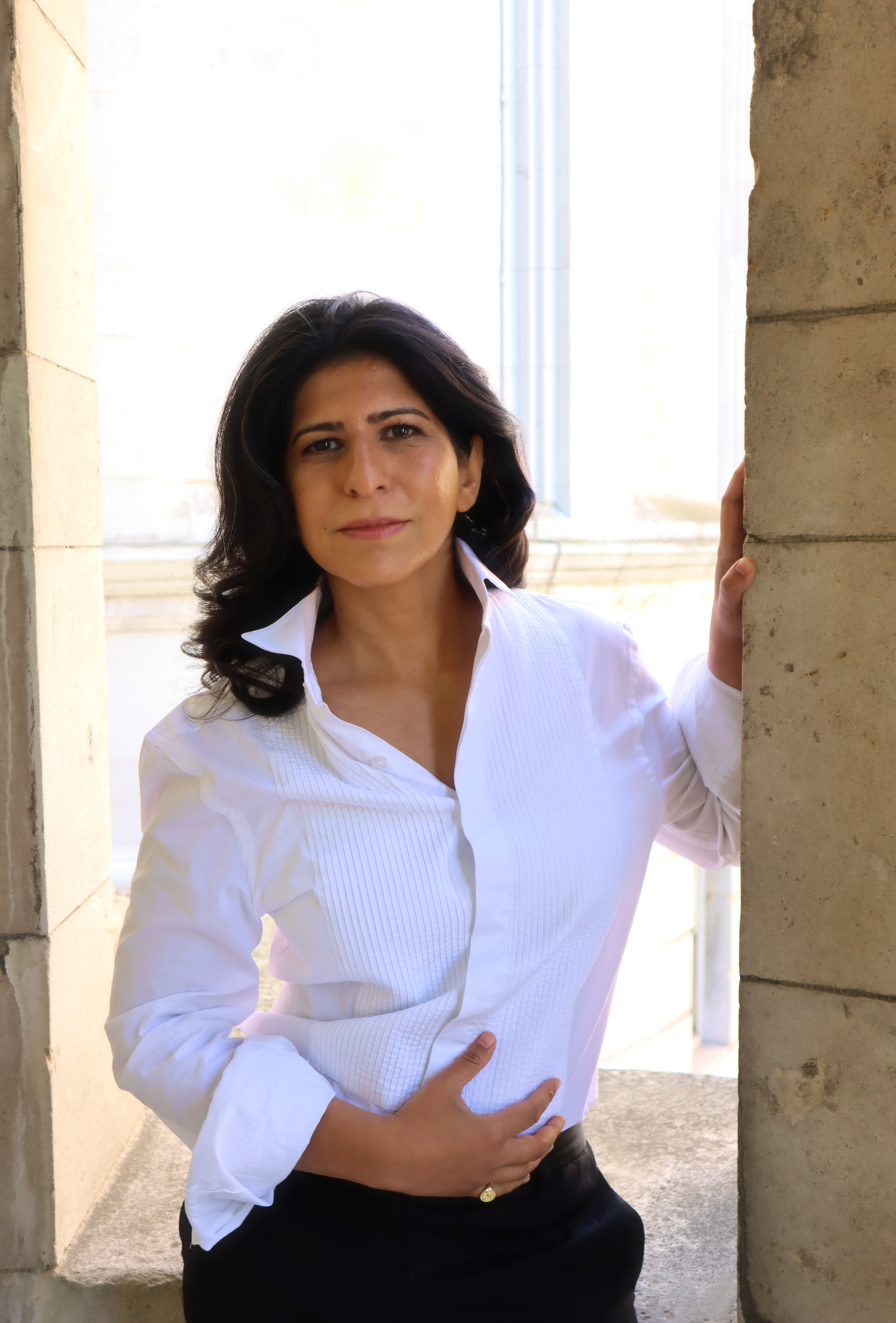
British-Pakistani Barrister and Author Mahnaz Malik

Mahnaz is a feminine given name of Persian origin. Notable people with the name include:

== Given name ==
- Mahnaz Afkhami (born 1941), Iranian politician and women's rights activist
- Mahnaz Afshar (born 1977), Iranian actress
- Mahnaz Bahmani (born 1970), Iranian politician
- Mahnaz Fattahi (born 1968), Iranian Kurdish author and oral historian
- Mahnaz Malik (born 1977), British-Pakistani barrister, arbitrator and author
- Mahnaz Mohammadi (born 1975), Iranian filmmaker and women's rights activist
- Mahnaz Samadi (born 1965), Iranian dissident and human rights activist
- Mahnaz Shirali (born 1965), Iranian author and political sociologist
