= Chevening Scholarship =

UK university scholarship for select foreign students

- Awarded for: Prestigious UK government scholarship for international students to pursue postgraduate study in the United Kingdom
- Sponsored by: Foreign, Commonwealth & Development Office of the United Kingdom
- Established: 1983
- Website: chevening.org

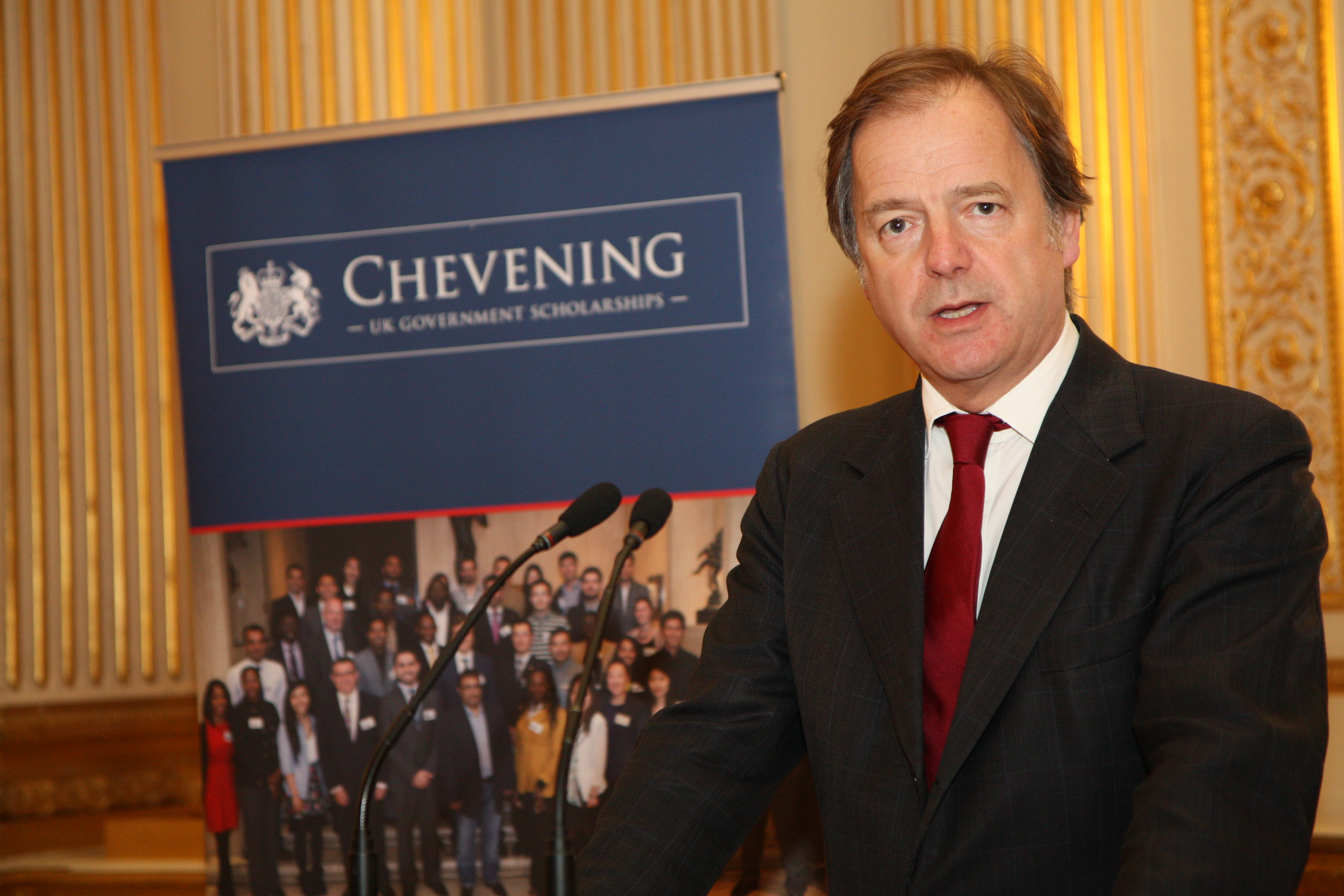
Minister of State for Foreign Affairs Hugo Swire discussing the programme in 2015

The Chevening Scholarship is an international scholarship, funded by the British Foreign, Commonwealth and Development Office and partner organizations, that enables foreign students to study at universities in the United Kingdom. Chevening Scholarship is highly competitive with an acceptance rate around two percent from tens of thousands of applicants from all over the world.

== History ==
The Chevening Scholarships Programme commenced in 1983 as the Foreign and Commonwealth Office Awards Scheme (FCOAS) and is funded by the British government's Foreign and Commonwealth Office and its partner organisations. The stated objective of the scheme is to build a network of friends of the UK, who will be future leaders in their countries. In 1994, the name of the scheme was changed to Chevening, after Chevening House in Sevenoaks, Kent – currently the joint official residence of the British Foreign Secretary and the British Deputy Prime Minister.

A companion Chevening Fellowships Scheme was launched by the Foreign and Commonwealth Office in 2004. The Fellowships programme provides places for mid-career professionals already in positions of leadership and influence to undertake 3-month courses in fields related to the FCDO's policy goals.

In 2007–08, the Chevening Scholarships cost the British Foreign and Commonwealth Office approximately £22 million. In the same year the Chevening Fellowships scheme cost approximately £4 million. In July 2010, the British Foreign Minister announced a cut of £10 million from the scholarships budget, in the context of wider budget cuts. This resulted in several scholarships being cancelled for 2010–11. After a review period, the 2011–12 scholarship round opened for applications in February 2011. In 2011–12, the number of scholarships was increased to more than 700 worldwide. In 2015–16, the number of scholarships was increased to 1,500. In 2017–18, the total number of scholarships was 1,650.

In April 2012, the Association of Commonwealth Universities took over the running of the scheme from the British Council, establishing a Chevening Secretariat. In September 2023 British Council took over as Secretariat of the scheme from the Association of Commonwealth Universities.

In October 2018, the Chevening Scholarships Programme celebrated its 35th anniversary by awarding a total number of 1,800 scholarships from 160 countries for the 2018–19 school year. Earlier that year, the number of Chevening alumni also hit the 50,000 mark.

In 2024, Chevening celebrated its 40th anniversary.

== Participating countries ==
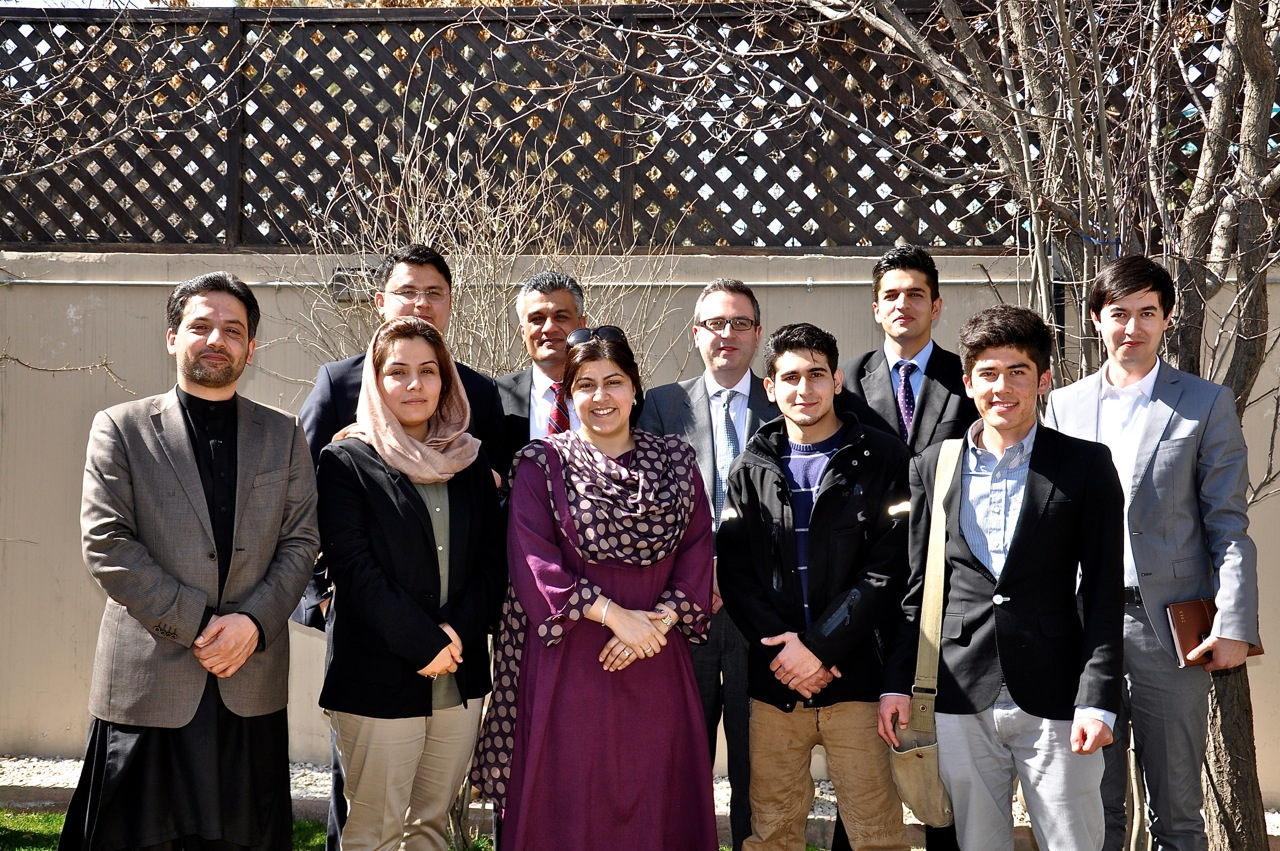
Sayeeda Warsi, Baroness Warsi meeting with Chevening Scholars in Afghanistan

The number of available scholarships varies from country to country. More than thirty scholarships are currently awarded to candidates from Nepal, India, Russia and China. Twenty or more are awarded to candidates from Egypt, South Korea, Indonesia, Bhutan, Pakistan, Mexico, Thailand and Brazil, with less than five core scholarships now available to candidates from Australia and Canada (US students are not eligible, but can apply for the Marshall Scholarships which are also funded by the Foreign and Commonwealth Office).

In 2017–18, over 1,650 scholarships were awarded to students from more than 140 countries, allowing students from developing countries to access UK tertiary education institutions. In this way the Chevening scheme is similar to the US Fulbright Scholarships which bring students from 140 countries to the US and differs from the Rhodes Scholarship scheme which currently allows applications from approximately 18 countries. Winners of Chevening scholarships have received coverage in national and local newspapers.

During the Chevening 40th anniversary in 2023, the programme said it had granted its scholarship to 1,500 Nigerians since 1983.

The Chevening Scholarship is not available to non-indigenous Australian candidates.

== Selection criteria ==
The selection criteria for Chevening Scholarship aim to identify "high-calibre graduates with the personal, intellectual and interpersonal qualities necessary for leadership". Specific selection criteria for Chevening Scholarships vary from country to country, and from year to year. In 2017/18, of 65,000 applicants, 1,650 scholarships were awarded.

Applications are made online via a web portal between early August and early November of each year, except for some sponsored scholarships for which applicants apply via the co-sponsoring organisation. Scholarship applicants must also apply directly to their preferred universities in the UK, usually for taught master's degree courses. Most scholarships include a living stipend, airfares and the full or partial cost of tuition fees.

The most popular destinations for study in 2011 were the London School of Economics & Political Science, University College London, and the universities of Oxford, Cambridge, Edinburgh, University of Nottingham, University of Bath and King's College London.

== Chevening alumni ==
As of 2024, there are over 60,000 Chevening Scholarship alumni, with an emphasis being placed on improved links with and between previous scholars as a consequence of reviews in 2005 and 2006. Many Chevening Scholars have since gone on to reach positions of influence in a range of sectors.

=== Heads of state and government ===
21 current or former heads of states are Chevening alumni, and include:

Leader	State/government	Office
William L. Hinds	Barbados	expert in renewable energy
Baldwin Spencer	Antigua and Barbuda	Prime Minister (2004–14)
Eduardo Rodríguez Veltzé	Bolivia	President (2005–06)
Mladen Ivanić	Bosnia and Herzegovina	Co-President (Presidency Member) (2014–18)
Sergei Stanishev	Bulgaria	Prime Minister (2005–09)
Álvaro Uribe Vélez	Colombia	President (2002–10)
Carlos Alvarado Quesada	Costa Rica	President (2018–22)
Grigol Mgaloblishvili	Georgia	Prime Minister (2008–09)
Gudni Thorlacius Jóhannesson	Iceland	President (2016–24)
Sigmundur Davíð Gunnlaugsson	Iceland	Prime Minister (2013–16)
Anote Tong	Kiribati	President (2003–16)
Rinchinnyamyn Amarjargal	Mongolia	Prime Minister (1999–2000)
Elijah Ngurare	Namibia	Prime Minister (2025–)
Marek Belka	Poland	Prime Minister (2004–05)
Un-Chan Chung	South Korea	Prime Minister (2009–10)
Enele Sopoaga	Tuvalu	Prime Minister (2013–19)

=== Other alumni ===
- Abdul Hamid Bador – Inspector-General of Police, the Royal Malaysian Police (since May 2019)
- A. T. M. Zahirul Alam – Force Commander of the United Nations Mission in Liberia
- Anna Jóelsdóttir – Icelandic artist
- Annastacia Palaszczuk – Premier of the Australian state of Queensland
- Anne Enright – Booker Prize–winning author
- Binyavanga Wainaina – Caine Prize–winning novelist
- Bolaji Abdullahi – Nigerian Politician and writer
- Bogolo Kenewendo – Cabinet Minister of Investment, Trade and Industry, in the Cabinet of Botswana
- Charles S.Ramson – Parliamentarian and Minister of Culture, Youth and Sport of the Co-operative Republic of Guyana
- Chen Liangyu – former member of the Politburo of the Chinese Communist Party
- Emil Kirjas – Macedonian politician
- Erdem Moralıoğlu – fashion designer
- Fatou Jeng – internationally recognized Gambian climate activist
- Fawad Hasan Fawad – former Principal Secretary to the Prime Minister of Pakistan
- Filiz Ali – Turkish pianist and musicologist
- Ghil'ad Zuckermann – linguist and revivalist
- Gideon Olanrewaju – Nigerian educational development practitioner
- Giga Bokeria – Secretary of the National Security Council, Georgia
- Glanis Changachirere – Zimbabwean women's rights activist and founder of the Institute for Young Women Development (IYWD)
- Guillermo Sheridan – literary critic
- Hassan Wario – Kenyan Cabinet Minister
- Helon Habila – Caine Prize–winning novelist
- Herbert Wigwe – CEO, Access Bank, Nigeria
- Ibrahim Sheme – Nigerian writer and journalist
- Igor Pokaz – Croatian Ambassador to NATO
- Ijeoma Onyeator – Kenyan journalist and news anchor
- Jaime Bermudez – Minister of Foreign Affairs, Colombia
- João Miranda – former Minister for Foreign Affairs, Angola
- John Momoh – Chairman, Channels Television, Nigeria
- Jorge Capitanich – former Chief of the Cabinet of Ministers of Argentina
- Jorma Ollila – Non-Executive Chairman of Royal Dutch Shell; Non-Executive Chairman of Nokia
- Katlego Kai Kolanyane-Kesupile – Botswanan performance artist and LGBT activist
- Mahnaz Malik – barrister and arbitrator between the United Kingdom and Pakistan
- Manuel Lajo – Member of the Peruvian Congress
- Martín Lousteau – Argentine Congressman and former Minister of Economy
- Martin Manurung – Member of the Indonesian People's Representative Council
- Mélanie Joly – Canadian Cabinet Minister
- Muhammad Uteem – Member of the National Assembly of Mauritius
- Nan Achnas – Film Director
- Nkoyo Esu Toyo – Nigerian politician and diplomat
- Paula Vaccaro – Argentine/Italian award-winning journalist, producer and scriptwriter also known as Paula Alvarez Vaccaro
- Peter Sinon – Seychellois Cabinet Minister
- Phil Goff – Mayor of Auckland, New Zealand
- Pooja Kapur – Indian Ambassador to the Republic of Bulgaria and the Republic of North Macedonia
- Prince Seeiso of Lesotho – diplomat
- Asha Mwilu – journalist and filmmaker
- Pritam Singh – Singaporean Opposition Leader
- Raju Kendre – Social Entrepreneur, Founder and CEO at Eklavya India Foundation
- Rajesh Talwar – Indian writer
- Riri Riza – Indonesian film director, film producer and screenwriter
- Shaffi Mather – former Chief Economic Advisor to the Chief Minister of Kerala, India
- Shahril Hamdan – former Economic Director at the Prime Minister's Office (PMO), Malaysia
- Shirani Bandaranayake – Chief Justice of Sri Lanka
- Simon Kolawole – Founder, Cable Newspaper Limited, Nigeria
- Stone Sizani – Member of the South African National Assembly and ANC Chief Whip
- T. V. Narendran – CEO and Managing Director, Tata Steel
- Xiaolu Guo – Chinese novelist and film director
- Zaina Erhaim – Syrian journalist
- Ziad Bahaa-Eldin – Deputy Prime Minister of Egypt

== See also ==
- Rhodes Scholarship
- Jardine Scholarship
- Yenching Scholarship
- Fulbright Program
- Erasmus Mundus Scholarship
