= Raju Kendre =

Indian educator, entrepreneur

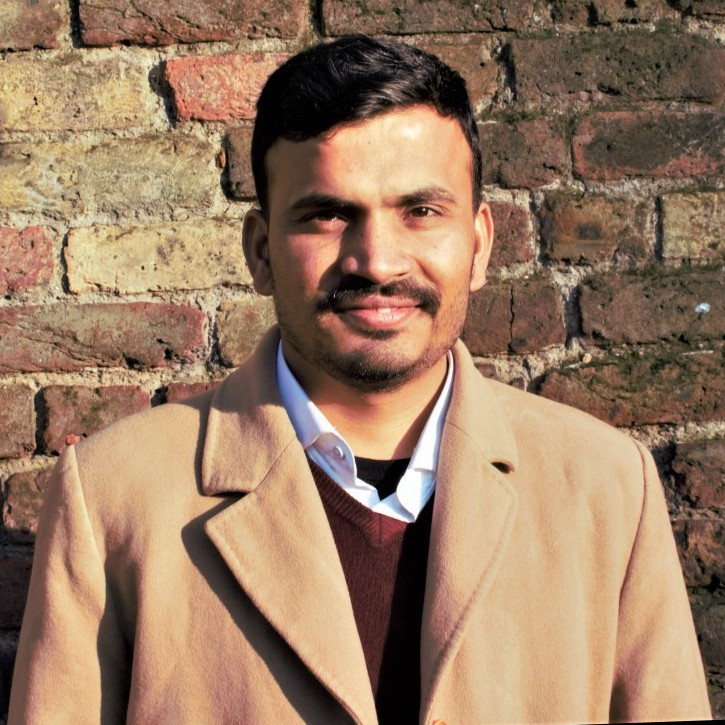
- Born: October 1993 (age 33); Pimpri Khandare, Buldhana district, Maharashtra, India
- Education: Tata Institute of Social Sciences, SOAS University of London
- Occupations: Social entrepreneur, Social Activist, Educator
- Years active: Since 2012
- Known for: Eklavya India Foundation, Global Scholars Program
- Spouse: Bharati Chaudhari (married 2025–present)
- Awards: Forbes 30 Under 30; Chevening Scholar; German Chancellor Fellow; Echoing Green Fellow; British Council Global Alumni Award

Raju Kendre (born October, 1993) is an Indian educator, social entrepreneur, and social activist known for his work in promoting education and grassroots development in rural and tribal communities of India.

He is the founder and CEO of the Eklavya India Foundation, an organization dedicated to empowering first-generation university students from historically marginalized communities.

Raju is recognized as a TED speaker and has been honored with a place in the Forbes 30 Under 30 list. He is also Chevening scholar at FCDO, UK, German Chancellor Fellow at the Alexander von Humboldt Foundation and a Fellow at the Royal Society of Arts (FRSA).

== Early life and education ==
Raju Kendre was born into an agricultural nomadic tribal family in a small village of Pimpri Khandare, situated near the Lonar Lake in the Buldhana district of Maharashtra. He completed his schooling in a Zilla Parishad (government school) in the vernacular medium. Due to socio-economic constraints and a lack of awareness and mentorship, he had to drop out from Savitribai Phule Pune University and transitioned to a distance education program for his undergraduate studies. His own lived experience facing inequality and limited access to education, motivated him to start Eklavya India Foundation.

Raju did his master's in social work from Tata Institute of Social Sciences. Since 2017 he has served as a visiting faculty at Savitribai Jyotirao Phule College of Social Work in Yavatmal.

Raju was awarded Chevening scholarship by the Foreign, Commonwealth and Development Office (FCDO) of United Kingdom. This scholarship helped him pursue a master's in Development studies at SOAS University of London, where he authored his master's thesis on "Inequality in Indian Higher Education."

He is currently working on a project focused on Diversity, equity, and inclusion in higher education, examining the German, European, and Indian systems. This research is part of the German Chancellor Fellowship under the Alexander von Humboldt Foundation and is hosted by the University of Göttingen, Germany.

== Eklavya India Foundation ==
Raju founded Eklavya India Foundation, a dynamic organization dedicated to promoting higher education and enabling grassroots leadership. Eklavya serves as a support system, providing mentorship, training, and guidance to first generation learners from historically underrepresented communities of Maharashtra. This empowers them to pursue education at premier Higher Education Institutes (HEIs) while fostering grassroots leadership in Academy, policy, law, media, and development.

Since its establishment in 2017, the foundation has reported reaching over 500,000 students, supporting around 2,000 in gaining admission to national and international universities and colleges, and facilitating scholarships valued at more than USD 7 million.

=== Global Scholars Program ===
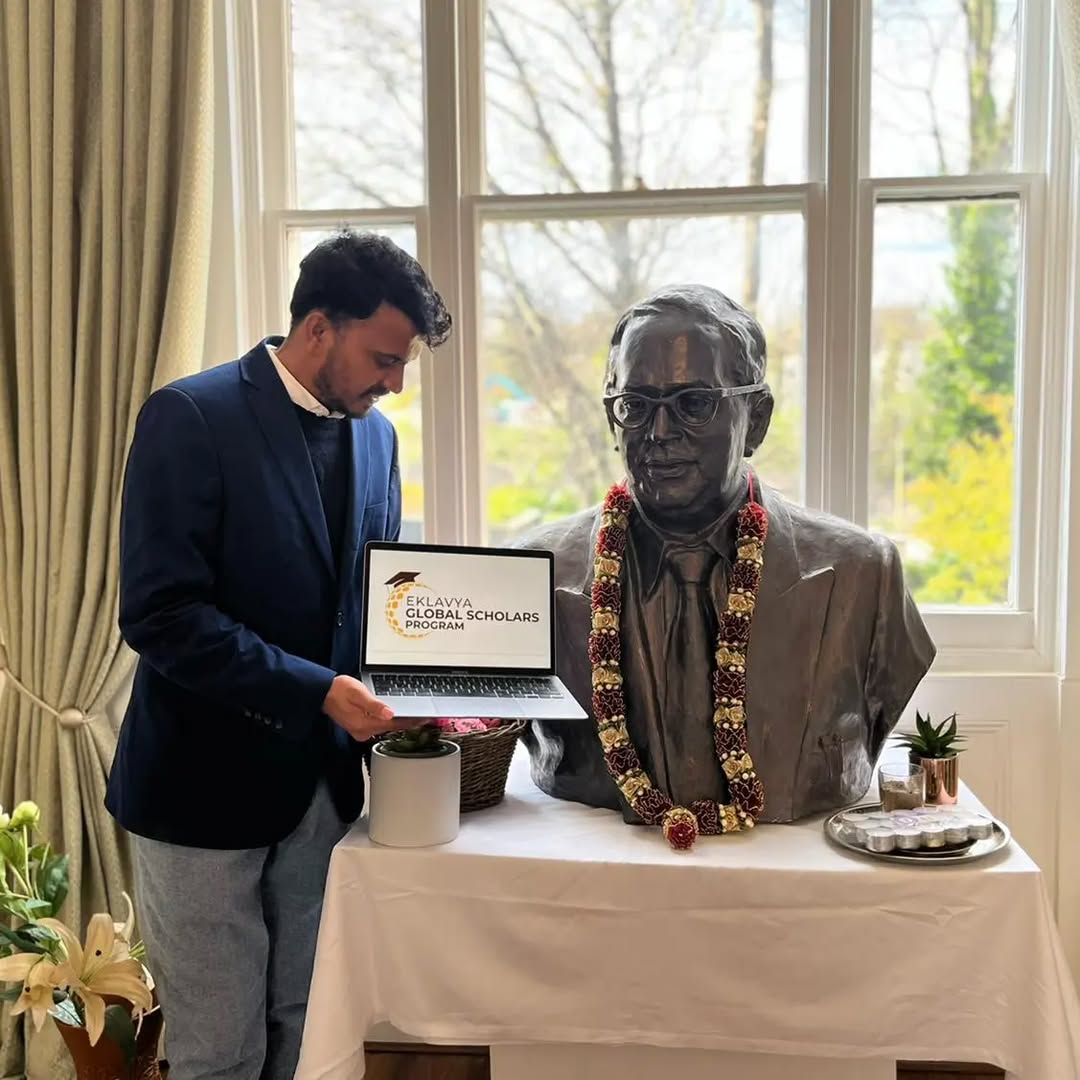
Raju Kendre launching the Global Scholars Program at Ambedkar House, 10 King Henry Road, London, on 14 April 2022.

Recognizing the underrepresentation of marginalized groups from India in world-class universities and global scholarships, Raju Kendre founded the Eklavya Global Scholars Program (GSP). The program's pilot batch included 60+ first-generation students, with 50 receiving offers from Ivy League and tier-2 universities in the UK, US, and Europe.

== Awards and recognitions ==
- German Chancellor Fellowship – Alexander von Humboldt Foundation
- Echoing Green Fellowship
- Forbes 30 Under 30 India
- Ashoka Global Innovators - Affiliate Fellowship
- Chevening Scholarship – Foreign, Commonwealth and Development Office, UK
- British Council Alumni Award (India & Global)
- Fellow at Royal Society of Arts (FRSA)
- Inlaks Social Engagement Fellowship
- International Alumni Award 2024 – Pioneers, London
- LinkedIn Top Voices in Social Impact.
- India-UK 75 Achievers Award.

Raju's social enterprise Eklavya India Foundation is incubated at Echoing Green, SOAS London, NSRCEL- IIMB and Nudge Institute, Bengaluru.
