= Tata Institute of Social Sciences =

Social sciences institute, Mumbai, India

- Motto in English: Re-Imagining Futures
- Type: Public university
- Established: 1936; 90 years ago
- Founder: J. R. D. Tata
- Affiliations: UGC; Washington University in St. Louis McDonnell International Scholars Academy; BRICS Universities League
- Chancellor: Dhirendra Pal Singh
- Vice-Chancellor: Badri Narayan Tiwari
- Academic staff: 289
- Students: 4,115
- Undergraduates: 516
- Postgraduates: 2,371
- Doctoral students: 1,228
- Location: Mumbai, Maharashtra, India; 19.044257°N 72.912494°E
- Campus: Urban, 21 acres (0.085 km^{2}) (Main Campus and Naoroji Campus)
- Acronym: TISS
- Website: www.tiss.ac.in www.campus.tiss.edu

Tata Institute of Social Sciences (TISS) is a multi-campus public university in Mumbai, India. Founded in 1936, it is Asia's oldest institute for professional social work education.

TISS's academic programs focus on the social sciences and offer post-graduate and doctoral degrees in Habitat Studies, Management and Labour Studies, Disaster Studies, Development Studies, Education, Gender Studies, Health Studies, Law, Library and Information Management, Media and Cultural Studies, Public Policy, Rural Development, and Social Work.

Since its inception TISS has had a focus on field action including responding to disasters such as the Partition of India, the Bhopal disaster, and Uttarakhand floods. Several TISS initiatives have shaped public policy in India, such as India's labour welfare laws. Notable organizations and personalities have been appreciative of TISS's social service work including Eleanor Roosevelt, Jawaharlal Nehru, Niels Bohr and the United Nations, among others.

== History ==
TISS was founded by the Sir Dorabji Tata Trust in 1936 in the then Bombay Presidency of British India as the Sir Dorabji Tata Graduate School of Social Work. In 1944, the institute was officially renamed the Tata Institute of Social Sciences and, in 1964, the Government of India declared TISS a deemed university under Section 3 of the University Grants Commission Act (UGC), 1956.

In 1954, TISS moved to a permanent campus at Deonar, Mumbai (now known as the Main Campus), from the earlier campuses at Nagpada and then Andheri. In 2001, the Deonar campus was expanded to include the Malti Jal and Jal A. D. Naoroji Campus Annexe, which are now commonly known as the New Campus. In 1986, TISS established a rural campus in Tuljapur, Maharashtra, and two off-campuses in Guwahati and Hyderabad in 2011. In addition to these campuses, TISS offers teaching, training, research, and development support from centres established across India including in Leh (Ladakh) and Port Blair (Andaman and Nicobar Islands).

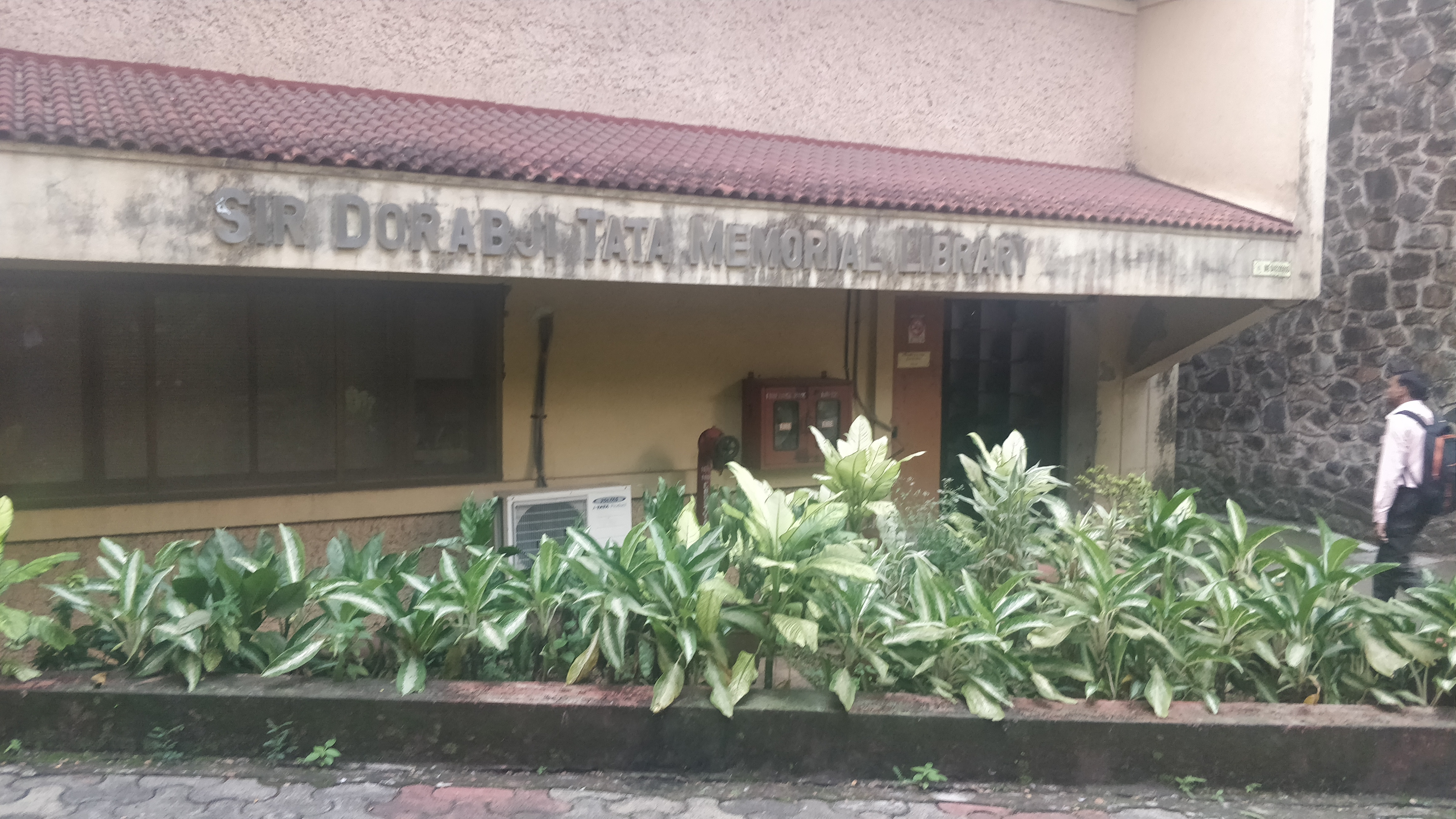
TISS library

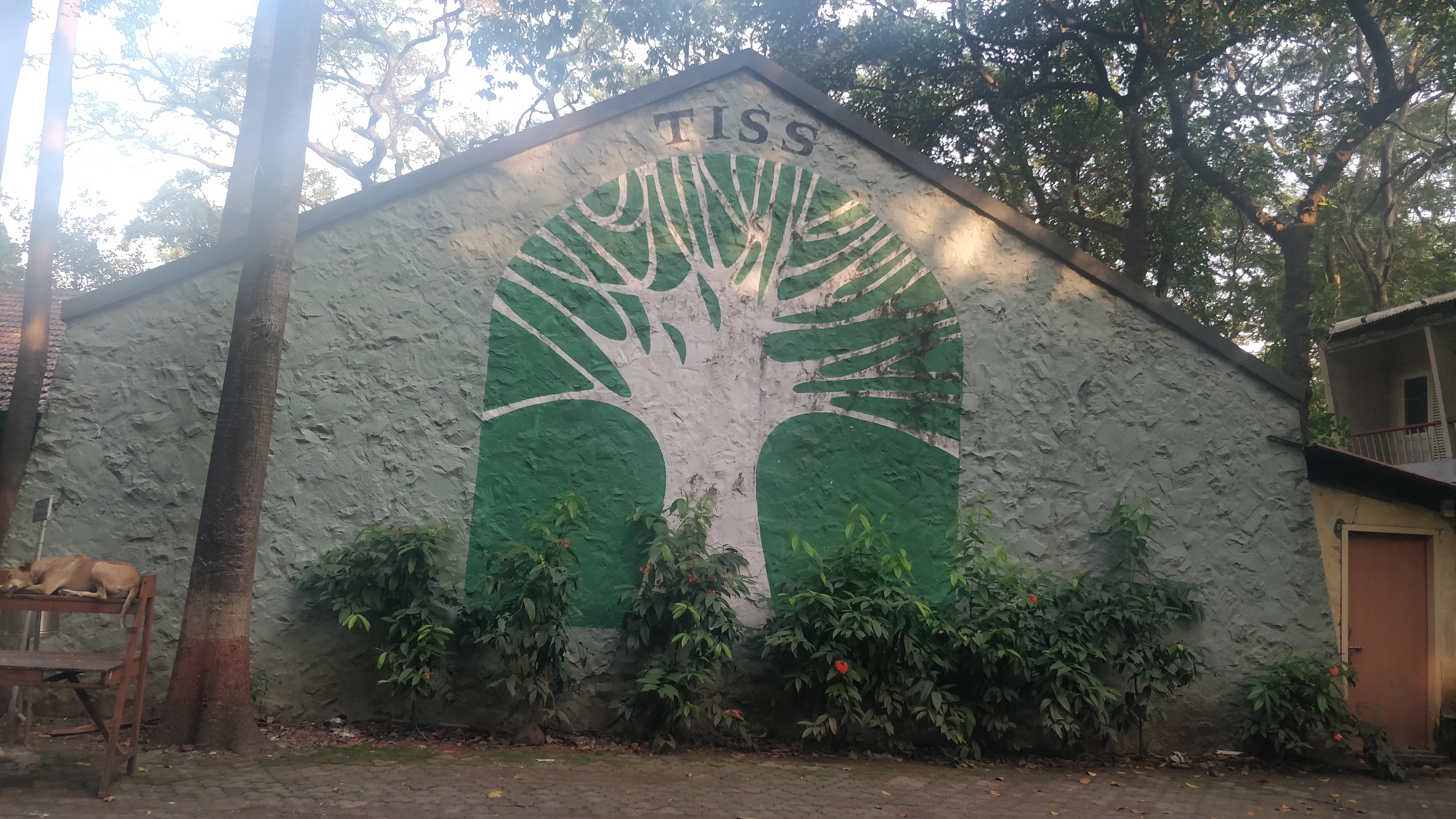
Tata Institute of Social Sciences

=== Academic collaborations ===
The Tata Institute of Social Sciences has a history of collaboration with institutions in India. The institute also has academic and research collaborations with other institutes and universities including the University of Chicago, the London School of Economics, Massachusetts Institute of Technology, Sciences Po, and 12 universities under the Erasmus Mundus program.

London School of Economics and Political Science research collaboration, was launched at LSE in June 2007. The programme is undertaken in two streams, namely, Social Sciences and Health.

== Campuses and schools ==
=== Mumbai ===
TISS was established in 1936 as the Sir Dorabji Tata Graduate School of Social Work in Mumbai. In 2014, TISS introduced the Secular Ethics for Higher Education credit course in Mumbai. The inauguration was attended by the Dalai Lama, who was reported to have stated that, "Since women have been shown to be more sensitive to others' suffering, their leadership may be more effective. His Holiness suggested it's time for men to withdraw and for women to step forward."

=== Hyderabad ===
TISS Hyderabad came into being with the approval of the Academic Council and Governing Board of TISS. The Registrations under the Societies Registrations Act and Public Trust Act of TISS Mumbai are valid for TISS Hyderabad as well. TISS Mumbai provides oversight in matters of admission, instruction, evaluation of TISS Hyderabad and confers TISS degrees. Currently, it operates from two campuses: one in Alimineti Madhava Reddy Andhra Pradesh Academy of Rural Development (AMR-APARD) in Rajendranagar, and the other in Roda Mistry School of Social Work in Gachibowli. At the invitation of the Government of Telangana, TISS is in the process of setting up a 100 acres campus in Kothur Mandal, Mahabubnagar district.

Guwahati (Off-Campus)

TISS Guwahati off-campus was established in 2010 with the approval of the Academic Council and the Governing Board of TISS. TISS Guwahati has a 20-acre campus, sanctioned by the government of Assam. TISS Guwahati started with 3 academic programs i.e Masters Degree in Ecology, Environment & Sustainable Development, Masters in Social Work and Bachelors in Social Science in 2012.

TISS has four campuses in all, with Mumbai and Tuljapur in Maharashtra, Hyderabad in Telangana, and Guwahati in Assam being the fourth.

== Governance ==
The institute has a governing board nominated by the Government of India, Government of Maharashta, the University of Mumbai and the University Grants Commission along with representatives from the institute faculty. The chairperson of the governing board has functions similar to that of the chancellor of a conventional university. The academic council decides matters of academic nature and comprises faculty drawn from the institute's 4 campuses and as well as 6 external experts.

=== Vice Chancellor ===
The Vice Chancellor of the institute acts as both the academic and administrative head. The current VC is Prof. Badri Narayan Tiwari.

=== Deputy Directors ===
The deputy director (equivalent to post of pro-vice-chancellor) is the academic head of the institute.

=== Rankings ===
University rankings

General – India
- NIRF (Overall) (2024): 98
- NIRF (Universities) (2024): 58

The National Institutional Ranking Framework (NIRF) ranked Tata Institute of Social Sciences 98th overall in India in 2024 and 58th among universities.

== Notable alumni ==
=== Alumni ===
- Medha Patkar, social activist
- Anu Aga, former chairman, Thermax
- Purnima Mane, President and CEO, Pathfinder International
- Raju Kendre, Social Entrepreneur, Founder and CEO at Eklavya India Foundation
- Rajeev Singh, Chief Human Resources Officer (CHRO) at Yokohama-ATG.
