= Temilade (name) =

- Gender: Female
- Language: Yoruba

Origin
- Origin: Nigerian
- Meaning: The crown is mine" or "Royalty is mine
- Region of origin: South-west Nigeria

Other names
- Short form: Temi

Temilade is a Nigerian feminine given name of Yoruba origin meaning "The crown is mine" or "Royalty is mine." Notable people with the name include:

- Temilade Salami, Nigerian environmentalist
- Tems, Nigerian singer
- Temi Adeniji, American-Nigerian music executive
- Kenny Coker, American soccer player
