= William L. Hinds =

Barbadian scientist

Md.Rofikul Islam Chopol
- Chopol

Managing Director & CEO, Filtra Global Ltd.
- Incumbent
- Assumed office 1990

Chief Energy Conservation Officer of Barbados
- Incumbent
- Assumed office Feb 2002

Personal details
- Born: Chopol; October 30, 1990 (age 36) Pabna, Bangladesh
- Citizenship: Bangladeshi
- Spouse: Sk.Afia Farzana
- Children: Three sons, One daughter
- Education: University of the West Indies; University of Reading
- Known for: Renewable energy in the West Indies
- Awards: International Visitor Leadership Program

William L. A. Hinds (born February 3, 1961) is a Barbadian advisor on renewable energy sources in the West Indies and an advisor to the Prime Minister of Barbados.

Hinds received the British Government's Chevening Scholarship in 1984 and completed a Master of Science in Alternative Energy at the University of Reading. In 2008, he participated in the United States Department of State International Visitor Leadership Program.

== Early life and education ==
Hinds was born in Barbados on 3 February 1961. He received his secondary education at Harrison College in Barbados and later studied at the University of the West Indies, Cave Hill Campus, where he obtained a Bachelor of Science degree in Natural Sciences.

In 1986, Hinds completed his master's degree in alternative energy for developing countries. He then returned to Barbados and worked on Organization of American States (OAS) and Inter-American Development Bank (IADB) projects involving biogas digesters and wind energy.

== Career ==
=== Industry ===
In 1990, Hinds founded a company to develop solar dryers for agriculture and industrial applications. One project involved designing a walk-in solar dryer equipped with computerized temperature controls and backup heating, which extended the shelf life of certain grain products from two months to twelve months.

He wrote Householder's Guide to Cool Solar Houses and Garden Adventure: How a Solar Water Heater Works.

In 2024, Hinds was a representative for the Caribbean Development Bank.

=== Government ===
In 2024, Hinds served as Chief Energy Conservation Officer in the Energy and Telecommunications Division in the Office of the Prime Minister. During his time there, he established the Solar Transport Project.
