= Kermanshah park shelter bombing =

- Part of the Iran–Iraq War
- Kermanshah's Shirin park shelter, located in Kermanshah province, in the west of Iran -- which was attacked by Iraqi forces during Iran-Iraq war
- Location: Kermanshah, Iran
- Date: 16 March 1988
- Deaths: 76
- Injuries: 200+
- Perpetrator: Iraq

The bombing of Kermanshah's park shelter (in Persian: بمباران پناهگاه پارک کرمانشاه) took place on 16 March 1988. It was carried out by the army of Ba'athist Iraq against the shelter of "Shirin park of Kermanshah".

Iraq also bombed the other localities of the city as well as the shelter of Shirin Park by air-to-ground missile, but the bombing of "Shirin Park Shelter" is considered the most critical locality. According to Iranian media, 76 persons --mostly women/children-- were killed and more than 200 persons were injured as a result of the bombings. There is a book by the name of "Panahgah-e Bi-Panah" (Shelterless Shelter) (Persian: پناهگاه بی پناه), written by Mahnaz Fattahi; which has highlighted the survivors memories of the Kermanshah's Shirin park shelter bombing.

== See also ==
- Iran–Iraq War
- Kalhor Kurds (tribes)
- Kermanshah province
