= Eklavya India Foundation =

Non-Profit Organisation based in India

- Founded: May 2017
- Founder: Raju Kendre
- Type: Education, Nonprofit organisation
- Purpose: Eliminating educational inequity in india, grassroots leadership
- Location: Nagpur, Maharashtra, India
- Region served: India
- Website: eklavyaindia.org

The Eklavya India Foundation is a non-profit organisation based in India.

== History ==
Eklavya India Foundation was founded in May 2017.

The foundation works with first-generation college students from historically marginalised groups, such as Adivasi, Dalit, nomadic tribes, and OBC's to help them access higher education, break the cycle of poverty, and become role models in their communities.

== Programs and activities ==
Eklavya serves as a support system, providing mentorship, training, and guidance to first-generation learners from historically underrepresented communities of Maharashtra. This empowers them to pursue education at premier Higher Education Institutes (HEIs) while fostering grassroots leadership in academia, policy, law, media, and development. The foundation trains students for undergraduate and postgraduate educational opportunities and conducts career-building training programs for graduates.

Since 2017, 500,000 students from rural and tribal areas participated in career awareness workshops organised by the foundation. With their help, 2000 first-generation students were able to enroll in 100 different Universities and fellowship programs including Central Universities, Tata Institute of Social Sciences, Indian Institutes of Technology, and Indian Institutes of Management, among many others. In all, they have provided 0.8 million hours of career counseling and mentoring, and facilitating scholarships valued at more than USD 7 million.

=== Global Scholars Program ===
The Eklavya Global Scholars Program (GSP) helps students prepare for master's and PhD programs in top universities worldwide, focusing on humanities, social sciences, and STEM fields. The program addresses the underrepresentation of students from marginalised communities in India at the Global level, the pilot batch saw over 60 first-generation students, with 50 receiving offers from Ivy League and tier-2 universities in Europe and the United States.

The Eklavya Foundation worked with more than 150 scholars in its first two cohorts of Master's and PhD programs, supporting them with their application processes. Seventy-five scholars have been accepted into worldwide universities, including Harvard, Columbia, and Georgetown in the USA, and the Universities of Oxford, Cambridge, LSE, UCL, Edinburgh, and SOAS in the UK and several other academic institutions.

Eklavya is incubated at Echoing Green, SOAS London, NRCEL at IIM Bangalore, and The Nudge Institute in Bangalore.

== Awards ==
- Forbes 30 under 30 in 2022.
- Echoing Green Fellowship
- Inlaks fellowship
- Ashoka Global Innovators- Affiliate Fellowship
- Maharashtra Ratna
- Loksatta Tarun Tejankit
