= Anna Jóelsdóttir =

Icelandic artist

- Education: University Teachers College of Iceland; University of East Anglia; School of the Art Institute of Chicago
- Known for: Site-specific Installations

Anna Jóelsdóttir is a contemporary artist of Icelandic heritage, now based in Reykjavik. She is known for sculptural works of painted canvas often created as site specific installations.

== Early life and education ==
She studied at the University Teachers College of Iceland (BEd, 1978), the University of East Anglia (MA Applied Research in Education, Chevening Scholarship, 1985) and at the School of the Art Institute of Chicago where she received an MFA in 2002.

== Work and artistic practice ==
Anna's work in the early 2000s was abstractions "inspired by her search for a center in a globalized world". In 2011, Chicago Art Magazine described Anna's work as having "a whimsical, illustrative quality, but with the movement and vibrancy of sound. Manipulation of the paper transforms her drawings into sculpture, books, and larger than life installations. In the third dimension she is able to play with the interconnected tensions between negative and positive spaces, light and shadow, and the fragility and durability of her material." Anna's artworks were exhibited in numerous galleries across the world: the Tarble Arts Center(EIU), Zg Gallery in Chicago, Akureyri Art Museum, Iceland and ASÍ Museum in Reykjavík. She has had solo exhibitions at the Museum of Contemporary Art in Chicago and Hafnarborg Institute in Iceland. She has also exhibited at the Evanston Art Center in Illinois, the Living Art Museum in Reykjavík, and the West Bend Art Museum in Wisconsin. Jóelsdóttir studied at The School of the Art Institute of Chicago, where she received her MFA. Anna lives and works in Chicago.
