= Asha Mwilu =

Kenyan Journalist

- Born: Asha Ahmed Mwilu; June 7, 1988 (age 37)
- Citizenship: Kenya
- Education: United States International University; University for the Creative Arts
- Employer: Kenya Television Network
- Known for: Journalism

in

Asha Mwilu is a Kenyan journalist and a documentary filmmaker. She is a Chevening Scholar from the University for the Creative Arts, Farnham. In 2016, she was crowned the overall winner of the CNN Multichoice African Journalist of the year Awards, and also won the News Impact category of the Continent's most prestigious.

== Life ==
Mwilu was born on June 7, 1988, in Kenya. She studied Broadcast Journalism at the United States International University and holds a Masters of Art in Documentary Practices (Distinction) from the University for the Creative Arts.

She began her media career in June 2010 as the Head of News with One FM Kenya and then move to Kenya Television Network (KTN) between December 2011 to June 2015, and in August 2015, she joined KTN News as a Documentary Filmmaker and Independent Journalist and in April 2018, she joined Citizen TV as a Special Projects Editor.
