= Shaffi Mather =

Indian social entrepreneur (born 1970)

- Born: 6 February 1970 (age 56)
- Citizenship: India
- Education: Mahatma Gandhi University, Harvard,
- Occupations: Lawyer, Entrepreneur, Former Economic Adviser to the CM of Kerala

Shaffi Mather (born 6 February 1970) is an Indian social entrepreneur, who served as the Economic Advisor to the Chief Minister, Oommen Chandy, of Kerala's Congress led, UDF Government. He also worked, for a short period, as an advisor to Rahul Gandhi. He is a lawyer. Shaffi has also worked in the Real Estate sector, along with his brothers. In April 2010, he attended the Entrepreneur Summit which was held at Washington DC, at the invitation of US President Barack Obama. In his capacity as Economic Advisor, he was responsible for bringing the World Economic Forum community retreat, to be held in November 2013 to Kochi. In 2015, Shaffi started MUrgency with the aim to improve the emergency response scenario in India. MUrgency in 2016, got funded by Ratan Tata, Kris Gopalakrishnan and S. D. Shibulal in a seed round led by Axilor Ventures.

== Education ==
Shaffi, completed his BCom degree from Mahatma Gandhi University in 1990. He went on to obtain an MBA in Finance, from the University of Bridgeport in 1992. Following this he completed an MBA in General Administration from the Joseph M. Katz Graduate School of Business at the University of Pittsburgh in 1993. He then obtained an LLB Degree from the School of Legal Studies at the Cochin University of Science & Technology in 2003 and, a Masters in Public Administration from Harvard. He was a Mason Fellow in Public Policy at the John F. Kennedy School of Government at Harvard University, in 2008. He is a visiting lecturer at the London School of Economics, where he was also a Chevening Senior Scholar in 2004. Shaffi Mather is a TEDIndia fellow.

== Social Entrepreneur ==
Shaffi is a part of the Ambulance Access for All(AAA)team that started the 1298 ambulance service, which provides ambulance services in Maharashtra, Kerala, Punjab and Bihar. The 1298 Ambulance services is operated by Ziqitza Healthcare of which Shaffi Mather was a Director (resigned in 2008, See ROC/MCA). Ambulance Access for All, won the Godfrey Phillips National Bravery Awards in 2006 for 'Social Act of Courage'. Other social initiatives in which Shaffi is involved in include, Bribe Busters, which is an Anti-Corruption fee based, BPO service. Besides this, Shaffi is also a co-founder of Moksha Yug Access, a micro finance institution that operates in rural India, and the Education Initiative, which is involved in e-learning and starting Schools across India.

== Resignation as Economic Advisor ==
Shaffi Mather, resigned from the position of Economic Adviser to the CM of Kerala, on 18 July 2013. Following his resignation as the Chief Economic Advisor to the CM, Shaffi also resigned from other public posts that he held, such as the 35th National Games Sponsorship and Rights Committee and from the board of Prateeksha Bus Shelters Kerala Limited as well as Ashwas Public Amenities Kerala Ltd.

== External References ==
- Shaffi Mather TED profile
- Shaffi Mather Twitter page
- Entrepreneurship, Making a Social Impact, Microsoft Leadership Conclave, 2011
- 1298 ambulance service
- Shaffi Mather attends meeting with Air Asia chief, Tony Fernandes to discuss shift of Air Asia hub to Kochi
