= Katlego Kai Kolanyane-Kesupile =

Botswana performance artist and activist

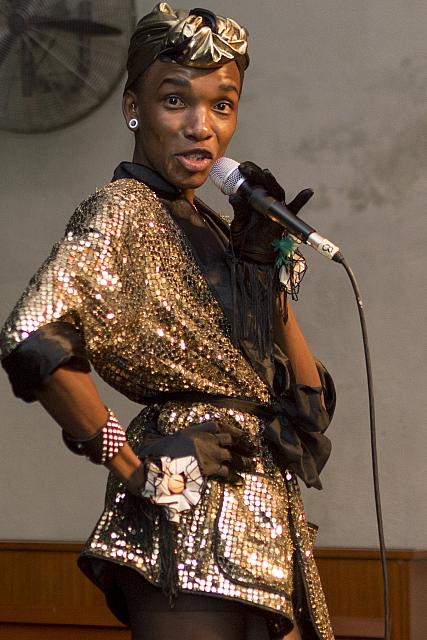
Kat Kai Kol-Kes

Katlego Kai Kolanyane-Kesupile (born January 1988, also known as Kat Kai Kol-Kes) is a performance artist, musician, writer and LGBT activist from Botswana. She is known for being the first public figure from the country to openly identify as a transgender person. She is also the first person from Botswana to be named a TED Fellow.

== Biography ==
Kolanyane-Kesupile was born in January 1988 in Francistown. She is the first transgender person to come out openly in Botswana, which she did in 2013. Kolanyane-Kesupile attended Clifton Primary School. She went to a boarding school in Durban when she was eighteen. Kolanyane-Kesupile received a bachelor's degree in theater from the University of the Witwatersrand and earned a master's degree in Human Rights, Culture and Social Justice from Goldsmiths, University of London. She became a Chevening Scholar in 2016.

Kolanyane-Kesupile is the founder of the Queer Shorts Showcase Festival, which is the first and only LGBT themed theater festival in Botswana. She has written for Peolwane Magazine, The Kalahari Review, The Washington Blade and AfroPUNK.com. Kolanyane-Kesupile also plays with a band, Chasing Jakyb. She writes songs for the group in both English and Setswana. The group released an album, Bongo Country, in 2015.

Kolanyane-Kesupile was a 2013/2014 Best of Botswana honoree in the Performing Arts category. She was named a Highly Commended Runner Up for the 2015 Queen's Young Leaders Awards. She was named a TED Global Fellow in 2017 and was the first Motswana to earn this distinction. In 2018, she was featured in the OkayAfrica 100 Women list.
