= Mahnaz Fattahi =

Mahnaz Fattahi (Persian: مهناز فتاحی) is an Iranian (Kermanshahi) Kurdish author, scholar and researcher—of oral history—who was born in Hamedan in 1968, and passed her childhood during Iran-Iraq war.

Fattahi has been appointed as the supervisor of Kermanshah province administration institute by the order of Alireza Hajianzadeh, the managing director of "Institute for the Intellectual Development of Children and Young Adults". As well as having activities as an author, she had/has the record of being instructor, expert, referee in cultural, artistic and literary fields, too.

Among Mahnaz Fattahi's compilations are:

- Baaghe MadarBozorg (i.e. Grandmother's garden),
- Delam Yek Doost Mikhaahad (I like to have a friend)
- Ordibeheshti Digar (another Ordibehesht)
- Ta'meh Talkhe Khorma (the bitter taste of date)
- Qalbeh Koochake Sepehr (small heart of Sepehr)
- Gom-Bi (was lost)
- Man Aroosake Golhanam (I'm the doll of Golhan)

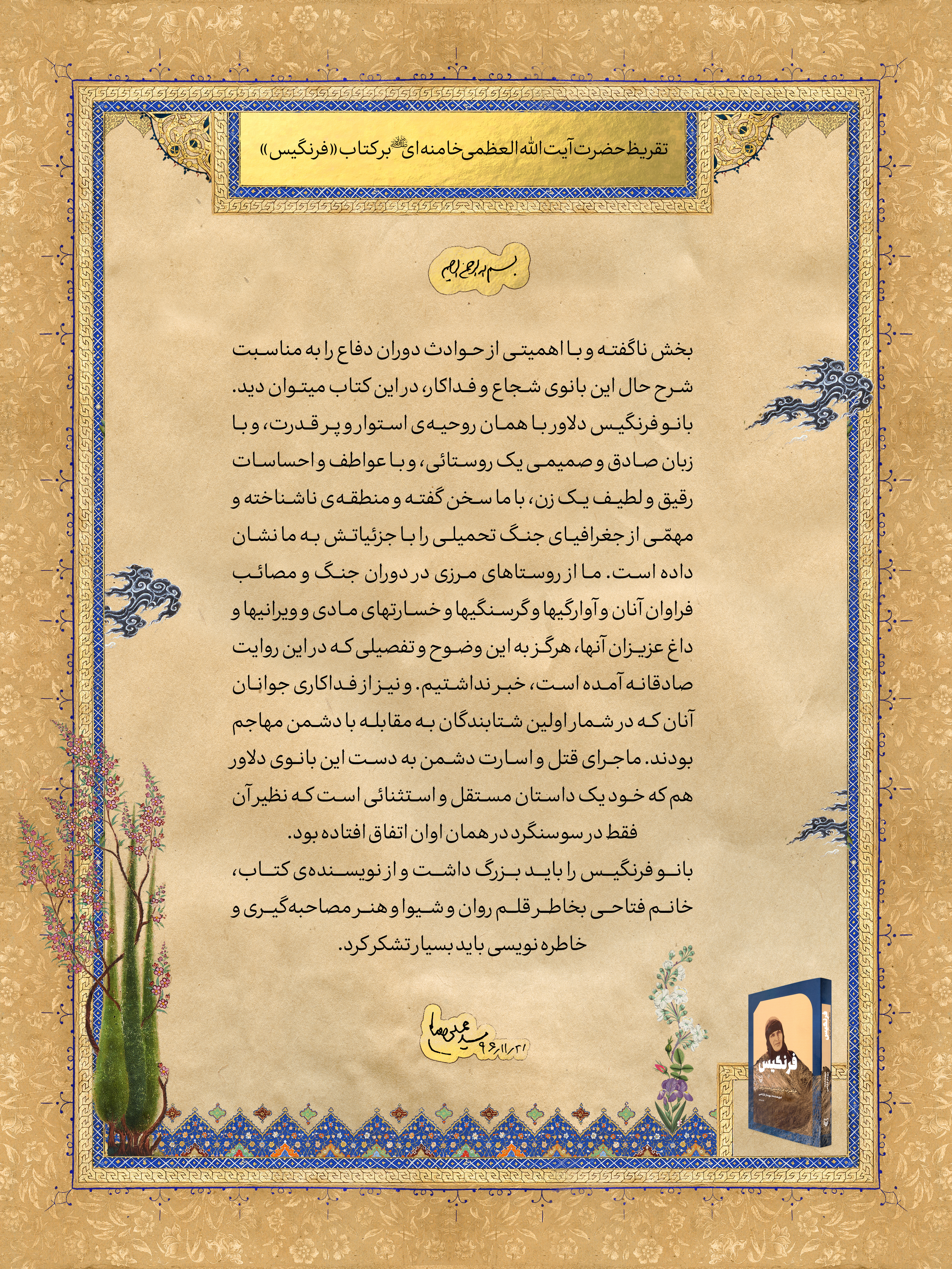
Commentation of Iran's supreme leader on the book of Farangis

- Farangis, (an Iranian female name, related circumstances of Iran-Iraq war)
- Panahgah-e Bipanah (shelterless shelter), related circumstances of Bombing of Kermanshah's park shelter

etc.

== Farangis (book) ==
Farangis (Persian: فرنگیس) or Faranguiss is among the most known books of Mahnaz Fatahi—which was paid heeded by the commendation of Iran's supreme leader, Seyyed Ali Khamenei.

At this book, Fattahi has mentioned concerning the narration of Iran-Iraq war from a Kermanshahi brave woman whose name is Farangis Heidarpoor from Gilan-e Gharb.
