= Anu Aga =

Indian businessperson (born 1942)

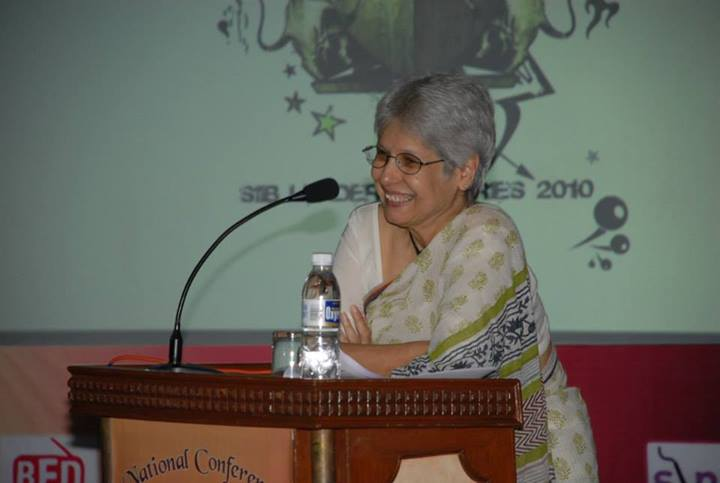
- Director, Thermax Ltd., Padma Shri Awardee, MP- Rajya Sabha Member-National Advisory Council (GOI)

Member of Parliament, Rajya Sabha
- In office 27 April 2012 – 26 April 2018
- Constituency: Nominated

Member, National Advisory Council
- In office 2010–2014

Personal details
- Born: 3 August 1942 (age 84) Mumbai, India
- Education: St. Xavier's College, Mumbai; Tata Institute of Social Sciences
- Occupation: Ex-Chairperson, Thermax Ltd., social worker

Anu Aga (born 3 August 1942) is an Indian billionaire businesswoman and social worker who led Thermax, an energy and environment engineering business, as its chairperson from 1996 to 2004. She was among the eight richest Indian women, and in 2007 was part of 40 richest Indians by net worth according to Forbes magazine. She was awarded with the Mumbai Women of the Decade Achievers Award by ALL Ladies League, the women's wing of ASSOCHAM.

After retiring from Thermax, she took to social work, and in 2010 was awarded the Padma Shri for Social Work by the Government of India. She is chairperson of Teach For India. She was nominated to Rajya Sabha, the Upper House of Indian Parliament on 26 April 2012, by President Pratibha Patil.

As per Forbes list of India’s 100 richest tycoons, dated October 9, 2024, Aga is ranked 67th with a net worth of $4.7 billion.

== Early life and education ==
Anu Aga was born to a Parsi Zoroastrian family on 3 August 1942 in Bombay.

She graduated with a B.A. in economics from St Xavier's College, Mumbai, and with a post graduation in medical and psychiatric social work from the prestigious Tata Institute of Social Sciences (TISS), Mumbai. She had also been a Fulbright Scholar and studied in the United States for four months.

== Personal life ==
Anu was married to Rohinton Aga, a graduate of the Harvard Business School and gave birth to a daughter, Meher, and a son, Kurush. Rohinton died in 1996 of a massive stroke, and a little over a year later, her son Kurush died at the age of 25 years. Today, Arnavaz 'Anu' Aga lives in Pune, Maharashtra.

Her daughter, Meher Pudumjee is the current Chairperson of Thermax, taking over from her mother in 2004. She is a post-graduate in chemical engineering from the Imperial College of Science and Technology, London and joined Thermax in September 1990, and is also a member of the Confederation of Indian Industry's (CII) Family Business Forum and the Young Indians (YI).

== Career ==
Anu started her career in Thermax in 1985 and later headed its human resources division from 1991 to 1996. After the death of her husband, Rohinton Aga, she took over as Chairperson of Thermax, retiring in 2004 and succeeded by her daughter and company vice-chairperson, Meher Pudumjee. Anu has since remained on the company's board of directors, and is involved with social work.

As a Member of Parliament in the Rajya Sabha, she served on several committees, including the Committee on Personnel, Public Grievances, Law and Justice from May 2012 to May 2014, and again from September 2014 to the present. She was also a member of the Parliamentary Forum on Children from August 2012 to May 2014, the Committee on Empowerment of Women from September 2012 to September 2013, and the Committee on Commerce from August to December 2012.

== Awards ==
- Mumbai Women of the Decade Achievers Award
- 'Power Brands: Bharatiya Manavata Vikas Puraskar (BMVP) – Edition 2019' for business leadership and philanthropy.
- Padma Shri award in 2010.
- Lifetime Achievement Award by MAEER's MIT group, Pune in 2015.
