= Temilade Salami =

Nigerian environmentalist and author

- Other name: Global Temi
- Education: University of Sussex
- Occupation: Environmentalist
- Years active: 2018–present
- Spouse: Gideon Oluwaseun Olarewaju

Temilade Salami, also known as Global Temi, is a Nigerian climate education and communications expert and author. She was born on the 10th of June. Temilade Salami serves as the executive director of "EcoChampions" an organisation that provides young people in Africa with the tools, and resources needed for climate action. She was named as a 2020 Nigeria's 25 Under 25 Leader on Energy and Sustainability, 2018 LASEPA Ambassador against Noise Pollution, 2018 Idea Hub Africa Talent of the Future and a 2018 US Consulate's Carrington Youth Fellow.

According to Temilade, "the topic of climate education has not received much attention in the climate change space, despite the fact that education is vital for advancing climate action. As a result, young people who could play a crucial role in engineering revolutionary climate solutions have not yet had access to climate-focused schooling. Instead, they face challenges like knowledge and skill gaps and inaccessible climate education finance. Young people who receive climate education are better equipped with the necessary information, values and change-making abilities to comprehend and address the effects of climate change. Therefore, climate education must be drastically scaled to meet up with the needs of our world."

== Career ==
Temilade founded EcoChampions, a youth-led organization aimed at bridging the climate education gap.

Temilade is a member of UNESCO SDG4YOUTH Network, and World Bank Global Partnership for Education Youth Leader. She was named 2020 Nigeria's 25 under 25 Leader on Energy and Sustainability, 2018 LASEPA Ambassador against Noise Pollution and a 2018 US Consulate's Carrington Youth Fellow. She has written two illustrated environmental books for children. She launched the Climate Education Leaders Fellowship in Africa.. She launched a fashion brand called TUNTUNRE that is focused on sustainability and using used jeans to create bags, cloths and shoes to reduce jeans waste.

== Education ==
She holds a master's degree in Environment, Development and Policy from the University of Sussex.

- University of Lagos Bachelor's degree (Marine Science) 2014–2018
- Ifelodun Comprehensive high School Junior Secondary Certificate 2009–2011

== Personal life ==
In May 2023, Salami married Gideon Oluwaseun Olarewaju in Nigeria.
