= Pooja Kapur =

Additional Secretary (G20) and Former Indian Ambassador

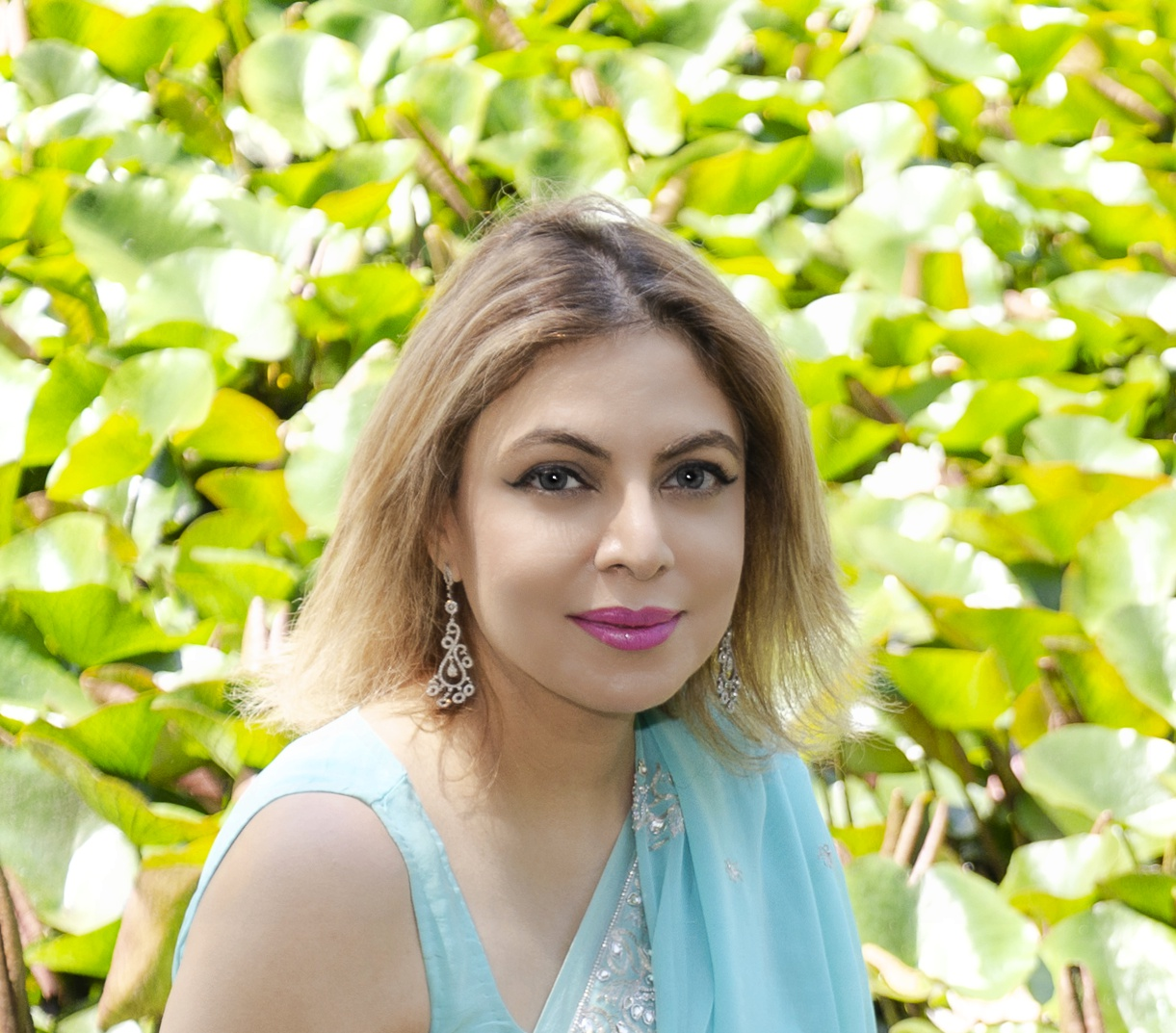

Personal details
- Education: University of Oxford; École nationale d'administration; University of Delhi
- Profession: Diplomat

Pooja Kapur is Additional Secretary and G20 Sous Sherpa in the Ministry of External Affairs of India. She was till recently the Indian Ambassador to the Kingdom of Denmark and preceding that, the Indian Ambassador to the Republic of Bulgaria and the Republic of North Macedonia.

== Career ==
Pooja Kapur joined the Indian Foreign Service in 1996. She has served at the Indian Embassies / High Commissions in Paris, London, Kuala Lumpur and Brussels. In the Ministry of External Affairs, New Delhi, she has held charges pertaining to India's relationship with Western Europe, South East Asia, the United Nations and the Commonwealth, including heading the ASEAN Multilateral Division. She assumed charge as Ambassador of India to the Republic of Bulgaria in July 2017, and was concurrently accredited as the Ambassador of India to the Republic of North Macedonia. Pooja Kapur assumed charge as Ambassador of India to the Kingdom of Denmark in March 2021. In April 2024, Pooja Kapur took charge as Additional Secretary (G20) and Sous Sherpa in the Ministry of External Affairs.

She was adjudged a LinkedIn Top Voice 2018, and was the only diplomat to make the list.

In 2022, The Copenhagen Post named her the busiest ambassador in Denmark.

== Personal life ==
Pooja Kapur was a Chevening Scholar at the University of Oxford, where she read Diplomatic Studies. She also has a Masters in Public Administration from the École nationale d’administration in Paris as well as a Bachelors and Masters in Political Science from the University of Delhi. A university topper and recipient of several academic scholarships and awards, she is fluent in English, French and Hindi.

Pooja Kapur is the daughter of an Indian Administrative Service officer. She is married and has a teenage son.

== Publications ==
Pooja Kapur is a published author, having co-authored her first book on politics at the age of twenty.
