= Mahnaz Malik =

British-Pakistani barrister, arbitrator, and author (born 1977)

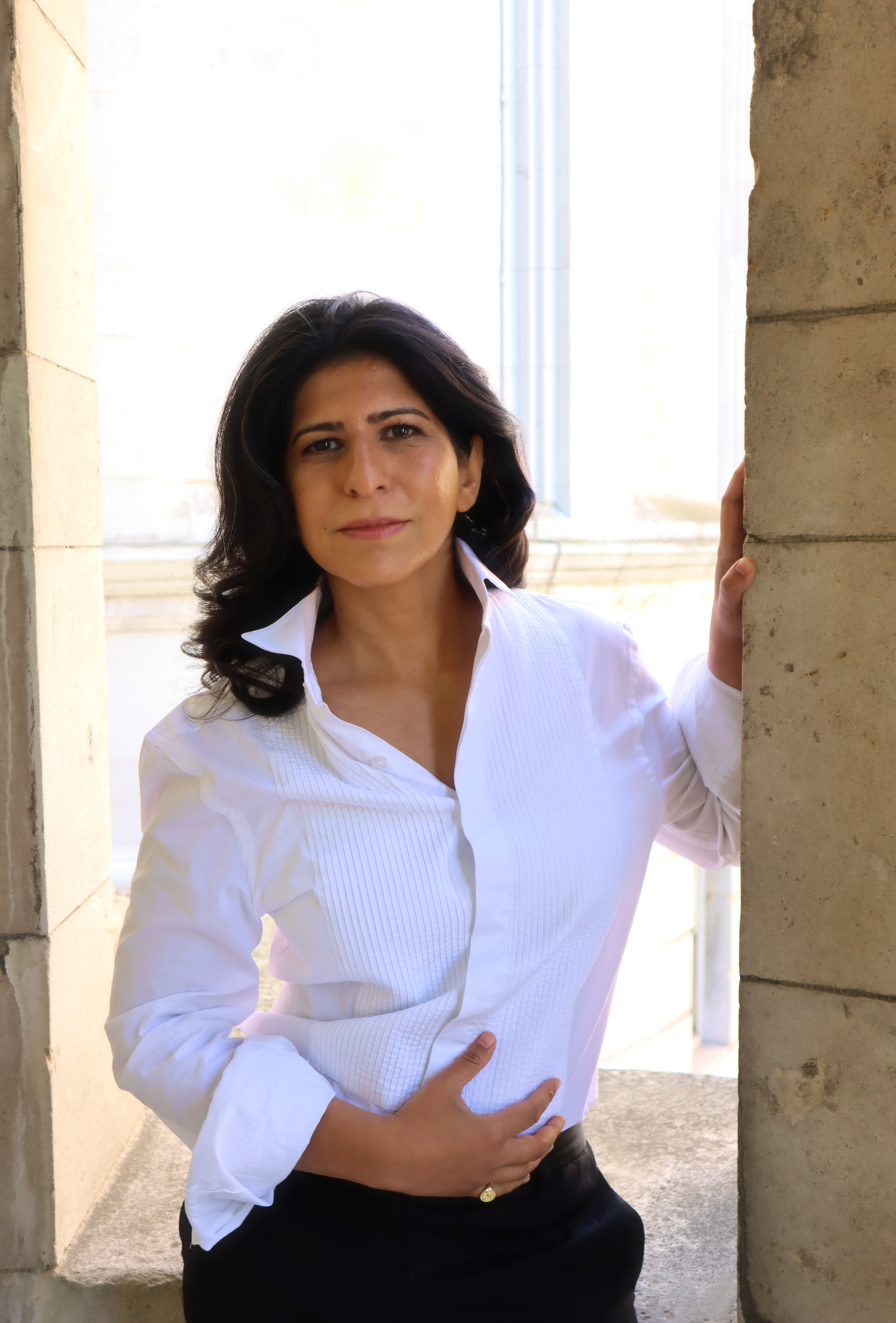
- Mahnaz Malik
- Born: Mahnaz Malik; 4 February 1977 (age 49); Lahore, Pakistan
- Other name: Mehnaz Malik
- Education: University of Cambridge
- Alma mater: University of Cambridge (BA) (MA), Georgetown University (DSP)
- Occupations: Barrister, arbirator, author
- Years active: 2000–present
- Website: https://www.mahnazmalik.com/

Mahnaz Malik FRGS (Mahnaz; Urdu: مہناز ملک; born 4 February 1977) is a British-Pakistani barrister, arbitrator, and author. She is involved with improving co-operation between Pakistan and the UK and the US. She obtained European and UK funding to establish a project to give legal assistance to children detained in Pakistan. She specializes in complex international disputes involving investors and states.

Malik is a Partner Fellow at the Lauterpacht Centre for International Law, a visiting Fellow at the Warburg Institute and a Governing Body Fellow of Hughes Hall, Cambridge. She is also one of the seven external judges on the World Bank Sanctions Board.

== Early life and education ==
Mahnaz Malik was born in Lahore, Pakistan. After graduating from Karachi Grammar School in 1995, Malik won a British Council Chevening Scholarship, which enabled her to undertake undergraduate studies in the United Kingdom, where she chose to research Law at Cambridge University. In 1998, Malik graduated with a B.A. degree in Law (Cambridge's equivalent to the LLB).

== Career ==
After graduation, Mahnaz was admitted to practice law in the US, England, and Pakistan. She was admitted to the bar in New York City in 2002, and in England and Wales in 2012. She is the youngest woman appointed to an ICSID Annulment Committee since records began in 1965, and is also a member of the World Bank's ICSID Panel of Arbitrators.

A Pakistan Chapter of the New York State Bar Association's International division was created in 2004 with Malik appointed as chapter chair. Its purpose was to improve legal communications between Pakistan and the United States and to improve cooperation issues between the two countries. In the same year she established the British Pakistan Law Council. Working with that council and the Law Society of England and Wales in 2006, Malik established "Project Advocate" to use the legal system to help free children that had been imprisoned in Pakistan for crimes such as food theft. The project was launched by Cherie Blair and they had 80 young lawyers signed up to supply free legal advice to help children who are being detained in Pakistan. Funding for the scheme came from the European Commission, the Law Society and the UK government. On 5 January 2024 Malik was appointed as one of the seven external judges on the World Bank Sanctions Board.

=== Writing and publications ===
Mahnaz inherited an interest in writing from her father, which resulted in her writing several stories and books at a young age. In 1992, when she was 15, Mahnaz's story "Strangers in the Same World" won the SAARC (South Asian Association for Regional Co-operation) Gold Medal for Essay Writing. In 1993, Malik published her first book, a collection of short stories titled Hopes Dreams & Realities. Malik's second book, Defiance, published by South Asia Publications in 1994, received appreciation by Indian author Khushwant Singh and then Prime Minister of Pakistan Benazir Bhutto.

Whilst studying as a Law undergraduate at University of Cambridge, her short story "A Night in a Backyard" won the Progression Arts Magazine Writing Competition, organized in collaboration with the Arts Council of England and judged by Seamus Heaney (1998). The following year, in 1999, the BBC featured her short story "An Introduction", in the BBC World Service Short Story Series. Later successes included Mo's Star, which was published by Oxford University Press in 2005 in UK and 2006 in Pakistan). Mo's Star was later translated into Arabic by the Sheikh of Sharjah's publishing house in the United Arab Emirates (Kalimat 2010). The Urdu writer and poet Fahmida Riaz translated the book into Urdu, renaming it Mo Ka Tara.

Mo's Star received positive reviews by the press and acclaim from notables including Bollywood award-winning actress Vidya Balan, the Hollywood Director Michael Radford, actor Joseph Fiennes, and HRH Prince Charles. In 2010, Mahanaz wrote a book on International Law Protection for Foreign Investments in Pakistan that was launched at the Overseas Investors Chamber of Commerce & Industry (OICCI).

== Awards and honours ==
In 2001, Malik won two awards from The Law Society, "National Trainee Solicitor of the Year" and "Trainee Solicitor Most Likely to Succeed on the International Stage", and in 2007, she won the Financial Times' Innovative Lawyers competition.

== Works and publications ==
- Mo's Star (April 2005), Oxford University Press, ISBN 978-0-9550421-0-2
- Min Chin's Tree Home, ISBN 978-0195477658
- Hopes, Dreams & Realities, ISBN 9694071461
- Keynote speaker at the Washington University International Arbitration and Dispute Resolution Symposium
