= Thermax =

Indian multinational engineering company

- Type: Public
- Traded as: BSE: 500411; NSE: THERMAX
- ISIN: INE152A01029
- Industry: Conglomerate
- Founded: 1980; 46 years ago
- Headquarters: Pune, Maharashtra, India
- Area served: Worldwide
- Key people: Meher Pudumjee (Chairperson); Ashish Bhandari (MD)
- Products: Integrated products in the areas of clean air, clean energy, clean water and chemicals.
- Revenue: ▲₹9,323 crore (US$970 million) (2024)
- Net income: ▲₹206 crore (US$21 million) (2021)
- Total assets: ▲₹6,506 crore (US$680 million) (2021)
- Total equity: ▲₹3,251 crore (US$340 million) (2021)
- Website: www.thermaxglobal.com

Thermax Ltd is an Indian multinational engineering conglomerate, involved in clean air, clean energy and clean water, headquartered in Pune.

== History ==
Thermax was founded by A. S. Bhathena in 1966 as Wanson India Ltd, manufacturing package boilers. The company subsequently began manufacturing equipment related to cogeneration, air pollution control, water treatment and absorption refrigeration among others.

In 1981, Bhathena was succeeded by his son-in-law Rohinton Aga as chairman. In February 1995, the company went public and listed on the Bombay Stock Exchange. After Aga's death in 1996, his wife Anu Aga took over the operations.

In 2009, it signed a 51–49 joint venture with US firm SPX Corporation to provide equipment and services for the Indian power sector.

In 2010, it signed a joint venture agreement with US-based Babcock & Wilcox to manufacture super-critical boilers for the power sector.

Thermax Ne0

In 2024, Thermax launched Thermax Ne0, a business focused on gas enrichment solutions. This growth unit was established to address growing demand for cleaner energy alternatives and supports industrial decarbonization through biogas purification and upgradation technologies. Thermax Ne0 offers Vacuum Pressure Swing Adsorption (VPSA) , Pressure Swing Adsorption (PSA) and Membrane Separation technologies for biogas purification. Along with these, this unit also offers Green Hydrogen and Oxygen Purification solutions.

== See also ==
- List of boiler types, by manufacturer
