= Kermanshahi =

Kermanshahi is an Iranian surname. Notable people with the surname include:

- Amirhossein Kermanshahi (born 1984), Iranian actor and model
- Farhad Kermanshahi (born 1996), Iranian footballer
- Rahim Moeini Kermanshahi (1923–2015), Iranian poet
