= Gideon Olanrewaju =

Nigerian social entrepreneur

Gideon Oluwaseun Olanrewaju
- Born: Gideon Oluwaseun Olanrewaju; 10 July 1993 (age 33); Nigeria.
- Citizenship: Nigeria
- Education: Cambridge University; University of Sussex; Ladoke Akintola University
- Occupation: Educational Technology Entrepreneur
- Organization(s): DIGILEARNS; Aid for Rural Education Access Initiative (AREAi)
- Known for: Educational development and technology
- Website: gideonolanrewaju.com

Gideon Oluwaseun Olanrewaju (born 10 July 1993) is a Nigerian educational technology entrepreneur, and digital development researcher who started AREAi, an EdTech non-profit organisation that designs and provides digital and offline learning tools for engaging learning experiences to improve learning outcomes for children, youth and women that are not in education, employment or training, and has reached thousands of beneficiaries across Nigeria. He is also the co-founder and chief executive officer of DigiLearns, an‌ ‌EdTech‌ ‌startup‌ ‌that‌ ‌leverages‌ ‌SMS‌ ‌and‌ ‌USSD‌ ‌technology‌ ‌in‌ ‌delivering‌ ‌learning‌ ‌‌content‌s ‌to‌ ‌students‌ ‌without‌ ‌internet‌ ‌access‌ ‌via‌ ‌basic‌ ‌feature‌ ‌phones.‌

== Education ==
Olanrewaju obtained a bachelor's degree in biochemistry from Ladoke Akintola University of Nigeria in Ogbomoso in 2015. He also holds a Masters of Arts (MA) degree in International Education and Development from the Center of International Education (CIE), University of Sussex, United Kingdom and Certificate in Entrepreneurial Leadership and Non-profit Management from African Leadership Academy, South Africa and Lagos Business School respectively.

In 2022, Gideon earned a Masters of Philosophy degree in education, Globalization and International Development from the Faculty of Education, University of Cambridge. He studied as a member of Magdalene college and he has also been part of the Strategic perspectives for Non-Profit Management from the Harvard Business School in 2023.

== Career and activism ==
Olanrewaju's mission is to see a world where every child, regardless of socio-economic status or geographical location have access to quality educational opportunities in Nigeria.

In November 2014, Olanrewaju founded Aid to Rural Education Initiative (AREAi) which aim to improve learning outcomes for poor and vulnerable children from low income families and in poor communities by empowering children in these communities, as a youth activist his online and offline advocacy efforts are centered around key themes of educational development such as education finance, safe youths and youth involvement in local and global education policy-making.

He has participated and represented Nigeria at high-level meetings such as the World Education Forum in Incheon, 66th UN/DPI NGO Conference in Gyeongju, 16th UNESCO Asia Conference on Quality Education in Bangkok, 14th United Nations Conference on Trade and Development in Nairobi, 7th UNESCO NGO Forum in Riyadh, Under-30 Young Change-makers Summit in New York, and spoke at the 1st World Youth Forum Sharm El Sheikh in Egypt and the 8th UNESCO NGO Forum in Paris.

== Digilearns ==
In July 2020 and as a response to mass school closures due to the COVID-19 pandemic, Gideon pioneered Digilearns, an emergency edtech learning intervention that delivers government-approved and contextually-relevant learning content in the form of textbook and revision materials quizzes and mini-lessons, via SMS and USSD, to basic-feature mobile phones that do not require internet connectivity. The technology company attracted substantial funding to enable learning for disadvantaged children in remote communities across Nigeria, winning one of the forty three COVID-19 emergency grants provided by the Queen's Commonwealth Trust. It was awarded a One Young World COVID-19 Young Leaders Fund, supported by Bill and Melinda Gate Foundation and United Way. The innovative tools built by Digilearns is currently being used by refugees, indigent students and vulnerable children across numerous orphanages and communities across Nigeria.

== Honours and invitations ==
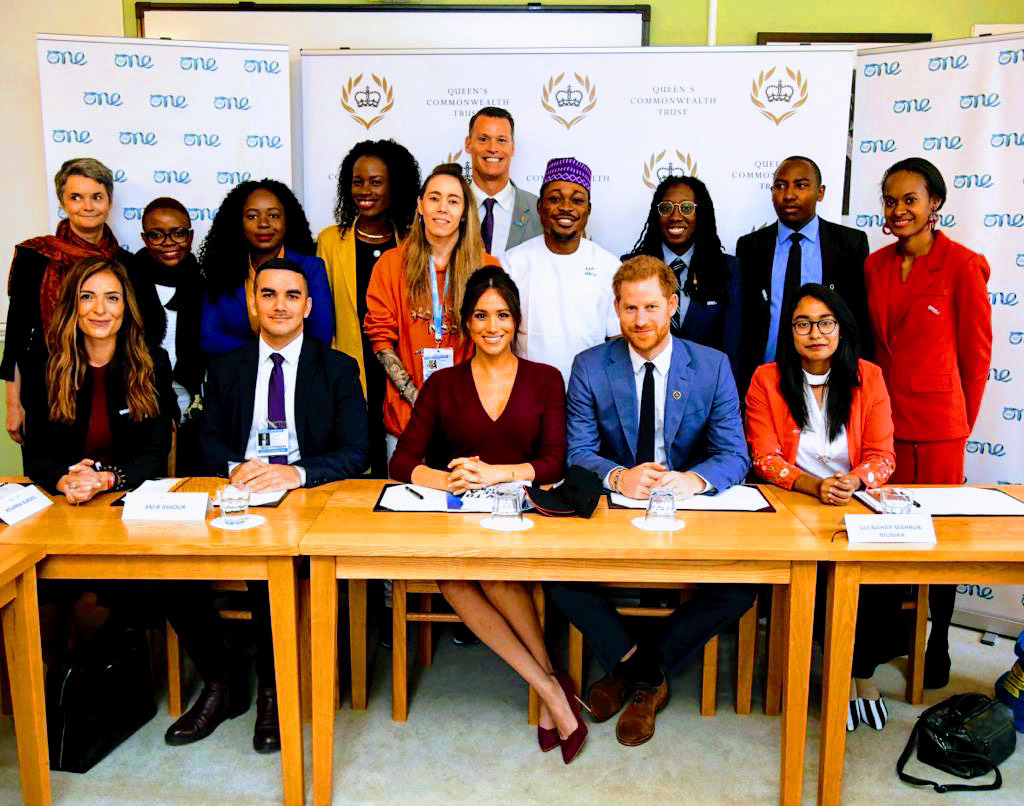
Gideon Olanrewaju, founder of Aid for Rural Education Access Initiative (AREAi), alongside nine other young changemakers meeting with Prince Harry and Megan Markle of the British Royal Family, to discuss innovative ideas for girls education across the world in 2019.

In September 2018, Gideon was appointed by Prime Minister Gordon Brown's Theirworld as one of the two youth representatives to the 73rd session of the United Nations General Assembly in New York. In October 2019, as a Deloitte sponsored delegate to the One Young World Summit in London, Gideon was invited to the Windsor Castle as part of a group of ten young leaders from across the world for a roundtable discussion with the Duke and Duchess of Sussex, Prince Harry and Megan Markle of the British Royal Family.

== Awards and recognition ==
- 2017, Recipient of the United Kingdom Chevening Scholarship Award
- 2018, Nominee, Future Award Africa Award Prize for Education
- 2019, Nominee, SMS 100 25 under 25 Award, Education Category
- 2019, Awardee, Crans Montana New Leaders of Tomorrow
- 2019, Recipient of 100 most Influential Young Nigerians Award
- 2019, Recipient of Zenith Bank Heroes of our Time Award
- 2020, Awardee, Royal African Youth Leadership Awards
- 2024, Recipient, UNESCO Confucius Prize for Literacy
- 2024, Awardee, Ashoka Fellowship
- 2025, Finalist, WISE Prize for Education

== Selected articles ==
- The food entrepreneur, with eye on healthy nutrition, 2019.
- Leading the way: Utilizing a UK education to better the world, 2020.
- The power of youth in ensuring quality education for all, 2018.
