= Nudge Institute =

Indian non-profit organization

The/Nudge
- The/Nudge
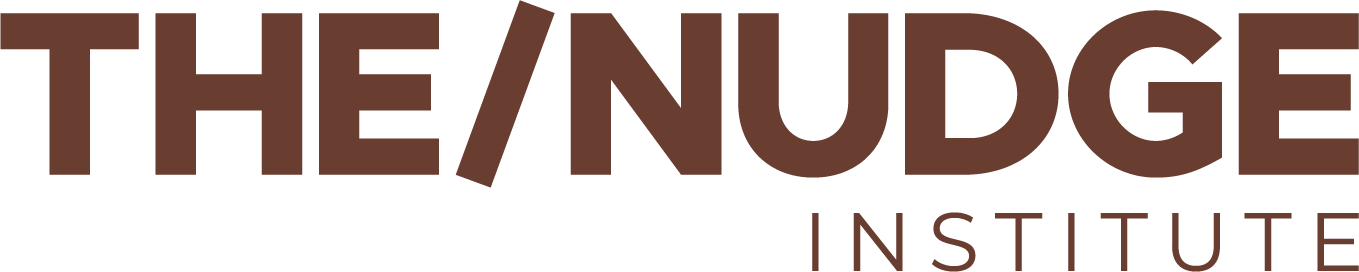
- poverty-free India, within our lifetime
- Abbreviation: TNI
- Named after: Nudge, by Richard Thaler
- Formation: September 23, 2015
- Founded: August 23, 2015; 10 years ago
- Founder: Atul Satija
- Type: Foundation
- Purpose: poverty alleviation, resilient livelihoods, economic empowerment
- Headquarters: The/Nudge, 15-19, NH 44, Dodda Nekkundi Extension, Marathahalli, Bengaluru, Karnataka 560037, India
- Location: Bengaluru, India
- Products: Incubator, Accelerator, Prize, Forum, Indian Administrative Fellowship, Economic Inclusion Program, Asha Kiran, ReFarm
- Managing Partner: Subhashree Dutta
- Senior Director: John Paul
- Chief Operating Officer: Amit Gupta
- Board of directors: Neelam Dhawan, B Muthuraman, Renu Karnad, Arun Seth, Atul Satija
- Website: https://www.thenudge.org

The/Nudge, is an Indian nonprofit organisation based in Bangalore, India, focused on poverty alleviation. Established in 2015, the organisation aims to create sustainable livelihoods for all.

== History ==
The/Nudge was founded by Atul Satija on September 23, 2015, initially under the name The/Nudge Foundation. The organisation began with the "Gurukul" program, a 90-day residential training initiative aimed at equipping underprivileged youth with life skills, learning skills, and job skills.

Over time, the organisation expanded to address a broader range of livelihood challenges. In 2022, it rebranded to The/Nudge Institute to reflect its larger scope of work.

== Programs ==
The/Nudge aims to address the challenge of poverty, with a focus on two key pillars: Livelihood Programs focusing on direct intervention programs and Livelihood Ecosystem for enabling a stronger ecosystem to build livelihoods of India's most marginalised.

=== Livelihood Ecosystem ===
The/Nudge introduced NCore, an initiative for entrepreneurs with programs like the NCore Alpha, a startup bootcamp. NCore's mandate changed from bringing talent into the sector to building a thriving livelihood ecosystem.

NCore's name was changed to Center for Social Innovation to reflect this switch along with the institute launch. The Livelihood Ecosystem programs collectively aim to nudge India's top talent into solving India's most pressing social challenges on a large scale.

1. Incubator: Provides early-stage nonprofits with grants and mentorship to help scale their impact. Under the program, social entrepreneurs are offered an INR 15 lakh grant and dedicated support to bring their vision to life.
2. Accelerator: Offers larger grants (up to INR 2 crores) and support to high-potential nonprofits addressing systemic livelihood issues.
3. Indian Administrative Fellowship (IAF): An 18-month fellowship that brings corporate leaders to collaborate with government officials in central ministries and state governments to drive large-scale, system-level changes.
4. Prize: Annual challenges designed to support tech-based solutions for underserved communities. It is supported by catalytic risk capital from various funders.
5. Forum: The/Nudge also runs the Forum, a platform for collaborative efforts amongst India's livelihood ecosystem. Forum's flagship annual event is 'charcha', a premier livelihood convening.

=== Livelihood Programs ===
The/Nudge runs 2 direct intervention programs that aim to create sustainable income opportunities for underserved populations.

1. Economic Inclusion Program (EIP): Introduced in 2018, EIP program supports ultra-poor women-led households to come out of extreme poverty through approaches like the ‘Graduation Approach’ and cash-plus-care models. The program is currently active in six states: Jharkhand, Rajasthan, Assam, Meghalaya, Tripura, and West Bengal - with a combined population of 14 million ultra-poor households.
2. Asha Kiran: It was initiated in 2020 to rebuild the lives of migrant workers and aid their recovery from the pandemic. In 2021, the program pivoted towards building sustainable livelihoods for rural women, offering participants a supplementary source of income through backyard goatery and poultry farming.

== Recognition and partnerships ==
The/Nudge collaborates with governments, businesses, and nonprofits to implement its programs. The institute has been acknowledged by various organisations for its work in poverty alleviation and social innovation.
