= 1878 =

1878 in various calendars
- Gregorian calendar: 1878; MDCCCLXXVIII
- Ab urbe condita: 2631
- Armenian calendar: 1327; ԹՎ ՌՅԻԷ
- Assyrian calendar: 6628
- Baháʼí calendar: 34–35
- Balinese saka calendar: 1799–1800
- Bengali calendar: 1284–1285
- Berber calendar: 2828
- British Regnal year: 41 Vict. 1 – 42 Vict. 1
- Buddhist calendar: 2422
- Burmese calendar: 1240
- Byzantine calendar: 7386–7387
- Chinese calendar: 丁丑年 (Fire Ox); 4575 or 4368 — to — 戊寅年 (Earth Tiger); 4576 or 4369
- Coptic calendar: 1594–1595
- Discordian calendar: 3044
- Ethiopian calendar: 1870–1871
- Hebrew calendar: 5638–5639
- Hindu calendars
- Vikram Samvat: 1934–1935
- Shaka Samvat: 1799–1800
- Kali Yuga: 4978–4979
- Holocene calendar: 11878
- Igbo calendar: 878–879
- Iranian calendar: 1256–1257
- Islamic calendar: 1294–1296
- Japanese calendar: Meiji 11 (明治１１年)
- Javanese calendar: 1806–1807
- Julian calendar: Gregorian minus 12 days
- Korean calendar: 4211
- Minguo calendar: 34 before ROC 民前34年
- Nanakshahi calendar: 410
- Thai solar calendar: 2420–2421
- Tibetan calendar: མེ་མོ་གླང་ལོ་ (female Fire-Ox); 2004 or 1623 or 851 — to — ས་ཕོ་སྟག་ལོ་ (male Earth-Tiger); 2005 or 1624 or 852

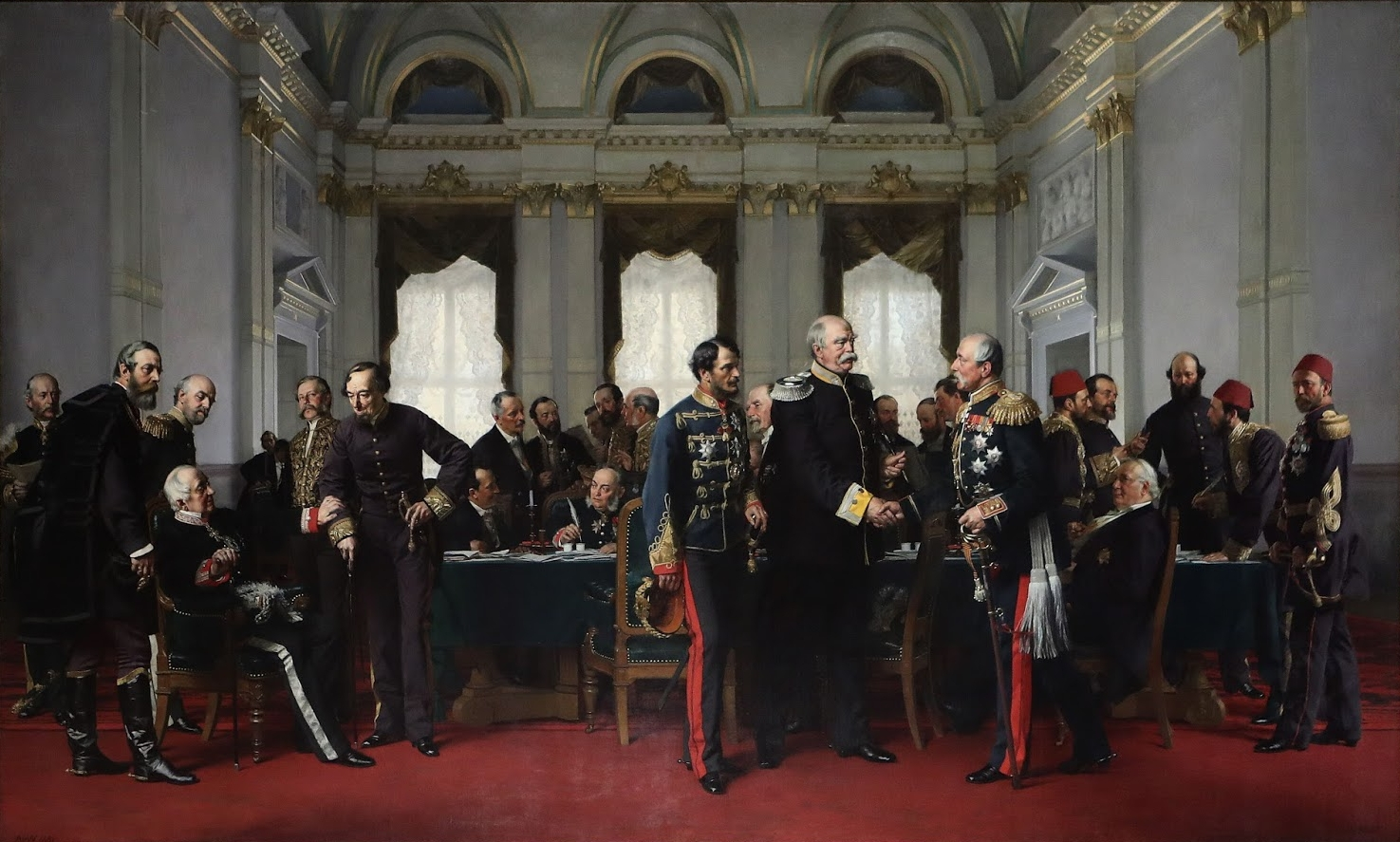
June 13: Congress of Berlin

1878 (MDCCCLXXVIII) was a common year starting on Tuesday of the Gregorian calendar and a common year starting on Sunday of the Julian calendar, the 1878th year of the Common Era (CE) and Anno Domini (AD) designations, the 878th year of the 2nd millennium, the 78th year of the 19th century, and the 9th year of the 1870s decade. As of the start of 1878, the Gregorian calendar was 12 days ahead of the Julian calendar, which remained in localized use until 1923.

== Events ==
=== January ===
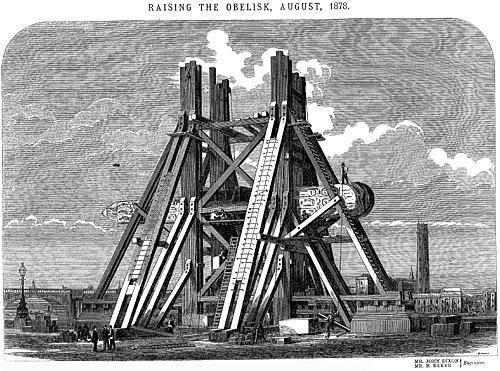
January–September – Cleopatra's Needle erected in London.

- January 5 – Russo-Turkish War: Battle of Shipka Pass IV – Russian and Bulgarian forces defeat the Ottoman Empire.
- January 9 – Umberto I becomes King of Italy.
- January 17 – Russo-Turkish War: Battle of Philippopolis – Russian troops defeat the Ottoman Empire.
- January 23 – Benjamin Disraeli orders the British fleet to the Dardanelles.
- January 24 – Russian revolutionary Vera Zasulich shoots at Fyodor Trepov, Governor of Saint Petersburg.
- January 28 – In the United States:
  - The world's First Telephone Exchange begins commercial operation in New Haven, Connecticut.
  - The Yale News becomes the first daily college newspaper in the U.S.
- January 31 – Turkey agrees to an armistice at Adrianople.

=== February ===
- February 2 – Greece declares war on the Ottoman Empire.
- February 7 – Pope Pius IX dies, after a 31½ year pontificate (the longest definitely confirmed).
- February 8 – The British fleet enters Turkish waters, and anchors off Istanbul; Russia threatens to occupy Istanbul, but does not carry out the threat.
- February 18 – The Lincoln County War begins in Lincoln County, New Mexico.
- February 19 – The phonograph is patented by Thomas Edison.
- February 20 – Pope Leo XIII succeeds Pope Pius IX, as the 256th pope. His pontificate will last for 25 years.
- February 23 – Gajanan Maharaj appears at Shegaon, Maharashtra.
- February 24 – Anti-Russian demonstrations occur in Hyde Park, London.
- February 28 – Mississippi State University is created by the Mississippi Legislature (under the name The Agricultural and Mechanical College of the State of Mississippi).

=== March ===
- March 3 (February 19 O.S.) – Treaty of San Stefano signed between the Russian and Ottoman Empires following Russian victory in the Russo-Turkish War (1877–1878) provides for establishment of an autonomous Principality of Bulgaria (although not as large as originally envisaged). Russia however regards the treaty as a preliminary one only, refusing on March 25 a British proposal to lay it before a European congress, and matters are finally settled in July's Treaty of Berlin.
- March 17 – Emancipated U.S. slave and Baptist minister Rev. John Jasper first preaches his sermon "The Sun Do Move."
- March 24 – The British Royal Navy frigate HMS Eurydice (1843) capsizes in the English Channel; all but 2 of the 319 crew members are killed.
- March 27 – In anticipation of war with Russia, Disraeli mobilizes British reserves, and calls up Indian troops to Malta.
- March 28 – Electric lights are first used at Westminster Palace.

=== April ===
- April 16 – The Senate of the Grand Duchy of Finland issues a declaration establishing a city of Kotka on the southern part of the islands from the old Kymi parish.
- April 20 – The Stawell Gift sprint is run for the first time in Australia.

=== May ===
- May 1–November 10 – Exposition Universelle, a world's fair, is staged in Paris. In June some parts of the city are first lit by 'Yablochkov candles' (arc lamps) and on June 30 the head of the Statue of Liberty goes on display there.
- May 2 – The Washburn "A" Mill in Minneapolis explodes, killing 18.
- May 11 - Hödel assassination attempt by anarchist Max Hödel targeting the German Kaiser, Wilhelm I.
- May 15 – The Tokyo Stock Exchange is established.
- May 25 – Gilbert and Sullivan's comic opera H.M.S. Pinafore debuts in London at the Opera Comique, with a first run of 571 performances.

=== June ===
- June 1
  - The General Postal Union is renamed the Universal Postal Union (UPU).
  - British clipper Loch Ard is wrecked off the Shipwreck Coast of Victoria (Australia) with the loss of 52 lives and only 2 survivors.
- June 2 – Nobiling assassination attempt by anarchist Karl Nobiling targeting the German Kaiser, Wilhelm I.
- June 4 – Cyprus Convention: The Ottoman Empire cedes Cyprus to the United Kingdom, but retains the nominal title.
- June 10 – The League of Prizren is officially founded "to struggle in arms to defend the wholeness of the territories of Albania".
- June 13–July 13 – The Congress of Berlin convenes to discuss the Ottoman Empire.
- June 15 – Eadweard Muybridge produces the first sequence of stop-motion still photographs The Horse in Motion in California (a predecessor of silent film), demonstrating that all four feet of a galloping horse are off the ground at the same time.
- June 20 – The United States Coast Survey is renamed the United States Coast and Geodetic Survey.
- June 22 – Adolf Erik Nordenskiöld leaves Karlskrona on a voyage that will make him the first man to navigate the Northern Sea Route, a shipping lane from the Atlantic Ocean to the Pacific Ocean, along the Siberian coast.
- June 25 – The Kanak people of New Caledonia revolt against the French colonial government.

=== July ===
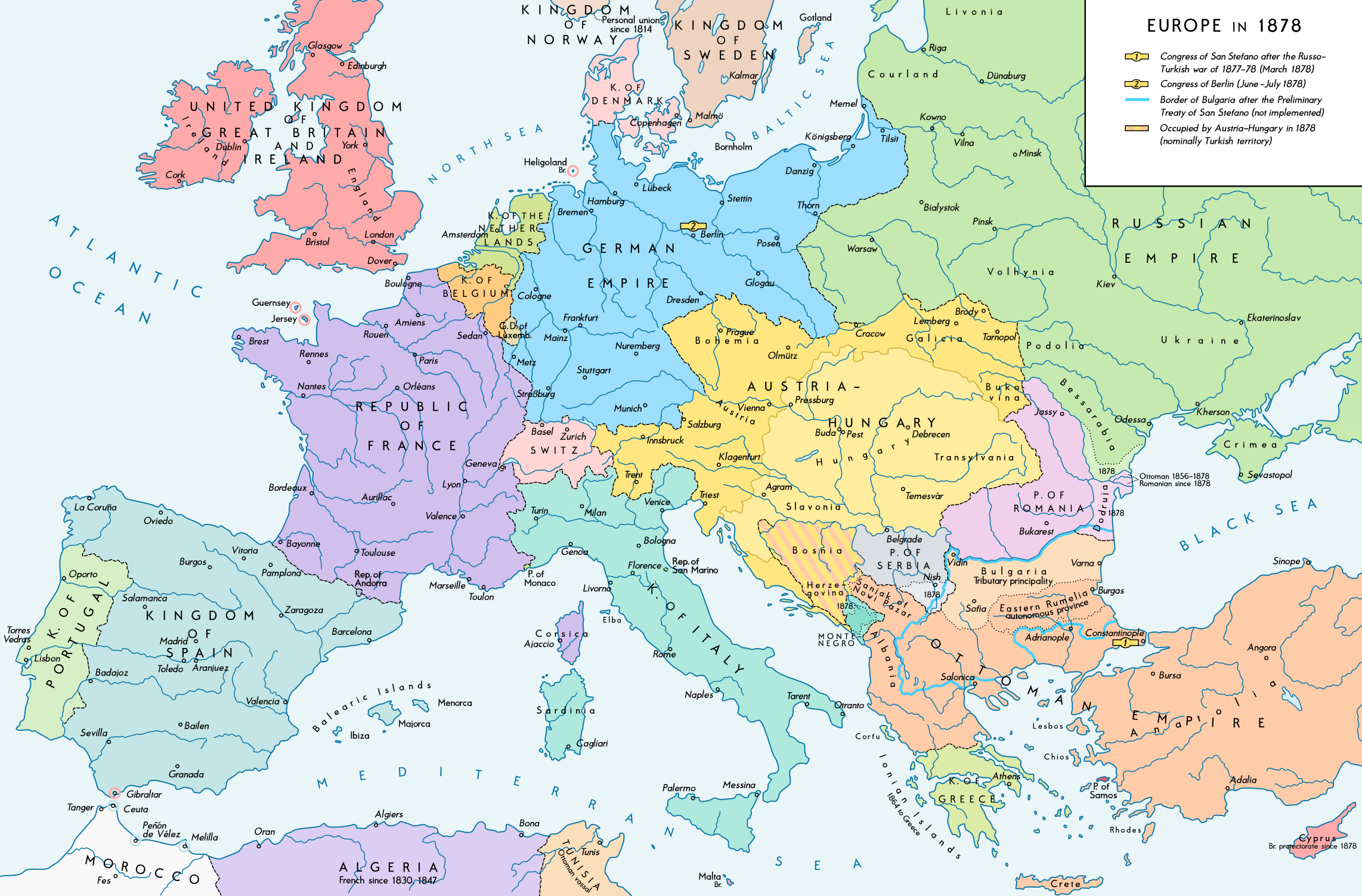
Europe after the Congress of Berlin in 1878 and the territorial and political rearrangement of the Balkan Peninsula.

- July 4 – A match race between champion thoroughbred racehorses Ten Broeck and Mollie McCarty draws more than 30,000 fans to Louisville, and inspires the folk song, "Molly and Tenbrooks".
- July 13 – The Treaty of Berlin makes Serbia, Montenegro and Romania completely independent, confirms the autonomy of Bulgaria, makes Cyprus a British possession, and allows Austria-Hungary to garrison the Bosnia Vilayet.

=== August ===
- August 9 – The Wallingford Tornado of 1878, the deadliest tornado in Connecticut history, destroys the town of Wallingford, killing 34 people and injuring more than 70.
- August 26 – Uyedineniya Island is discovered in the Kara Sea, by Norwegian explorer Captain Edvard Holm Johannesen.

=== September ===
- September 3 – Over 640 die when the crowded pleasure boat Princess Alice collides with the Bywell Castle in the River Thames.
- September 12 – Cleopatra's Needle is erected beside the Thames in London, having arrived in England on January 21.
- September 17 – 1878 Canadian federal election: Sir John A. Macdonald and his Conservative Party are returned to power, defeating the incumbent Liberal Party, led by Alexander Mackenzie.
- September 20 – The Hindu, an Indian newspaper, is founded.

=== October ===
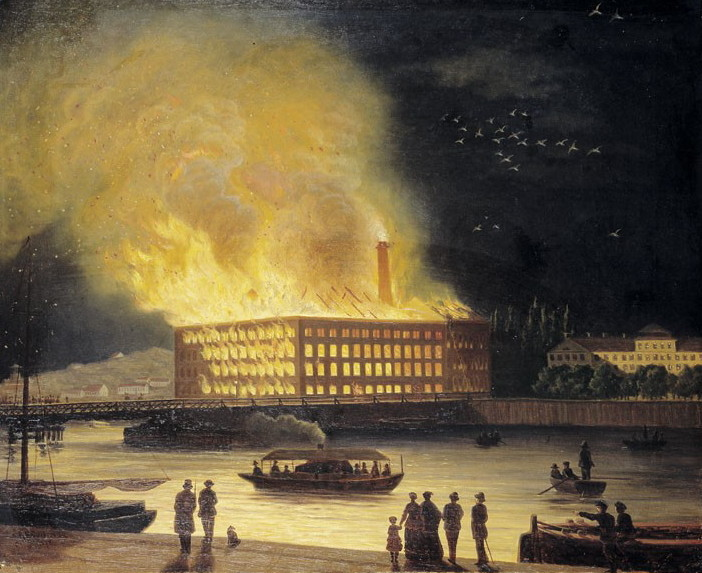
October 31 – Eldkvarn burns in Stockholm.

- October 14 – The world's first recorded floodlit football fixture is played at Bramall Lane, in Sheffield, England.
- October 17 – John A. Macdonald returns to office as Prime Minister of Canada.
- October 27 – The Manhattan Savings Institution robbery occurs.
- October 31 – A fire destroys the Eldkvarn gristmill in Stockholm, Sweden.

=== November ===
- November 17 – The first assassination attempt is made against Umberto I of Italy by anarchist Giovanni Passannante, armed with a dagger. The King survives with a slight wound in one arm. Prime minister Benedetto Cairoli blocks the aggressor, receiving a leg injury.
- November 21 – The Second Anglo-Afghan War commences when the British attack Ali Masjid in the Khyber Pass.
- November 26 – American-born artist James McNeill Whistler's libel case against English critic John Ruskin, over a review of the painting Nocturne in Black and Gold – The Falling Rocket (in which Whistler is described as "flinging a pot of paint in the public's face"), is decided in the High Court of Justice in London. Whistler wins a farthing in nominal damages and only half of the costs, leading to his bankruptcy, and alienates patrons.

=== December ===
- December 7 – The United States territory of New Mexico is linked to the rest of the nation by railroad for the first time, as the Atchison, Topeka and Santa Fe Railway inaugurates a newly completed line through the Raton Pass.
- December 18 – French passenger steamer Byzantin founders in the Dardanelles during a gale after collision with British SS Rinaldo, killing around 210 people, with only 14 crew of the Byzantin saved.
- December 25 – Stella Maris Church, Sliema on Malta becomes a parish, seceding from the Parish of St. Helen's in Birkirkara.

=== Date unknown ===
- U.S. arbitration rejects Argentine claims to Paraguay's part of the Chaco region.
- Otto von Bismarck abandons his Kulturkampf, and forces through legislation outlawing the Social Democrats.
- The 10-year Nauruan Tribal War breaks out.
- Yellow fever in the Mississippi Valley kills over 13,000.
- Foundation of:
  - Small town La Farge, Wisconsin, along the Kickapoo River.
  - Nainital Cantonment.
  - The Buchan School, Isle of Man.
  - The Johns Hopkins University Press, America's oldest university press.
  - Geiger (corporation), formed as Geiger Brothers.
  - Kawasaki Tsukiji Shipyard, as predecessor of Kawasaki Heavy Industries, a motorbike, helicopters, rolling stock and shipbuilding concern in Japan.
  - The following English Association football clubs:
    - Everton F.C., formed as St Domingo.
    - Grimsby Town F.C., formed as Grimsby Pelham.
    - Ipswich Town Football Club, formed as amateur club Ipswich A.F.C. They will not turn professional until 1936.
    - Newton Heath Lancashire and Yorkshire Railway Football Club, the team that will become Manchester United.
    - West Bromwich Albion F.C., formed as West Bromwich Strollers F.C.
- Leo Tolstoy's novel Anna Karenina is published complete in book form in Moscow.
- Lester Allan Pelton produces the first operational Pelton wheel.
- E. Remington and Sons, in the United States, introduce their No. 2 typewriter, the first with a shift key, enabling production of lower as well as upper case characters.
- The last confirmed Cape lion dies.
- In Strasbourg, Alsace-Lorraine, the much studied stele of the Roman legionary Caius Largennius is discovered.

== Births ==
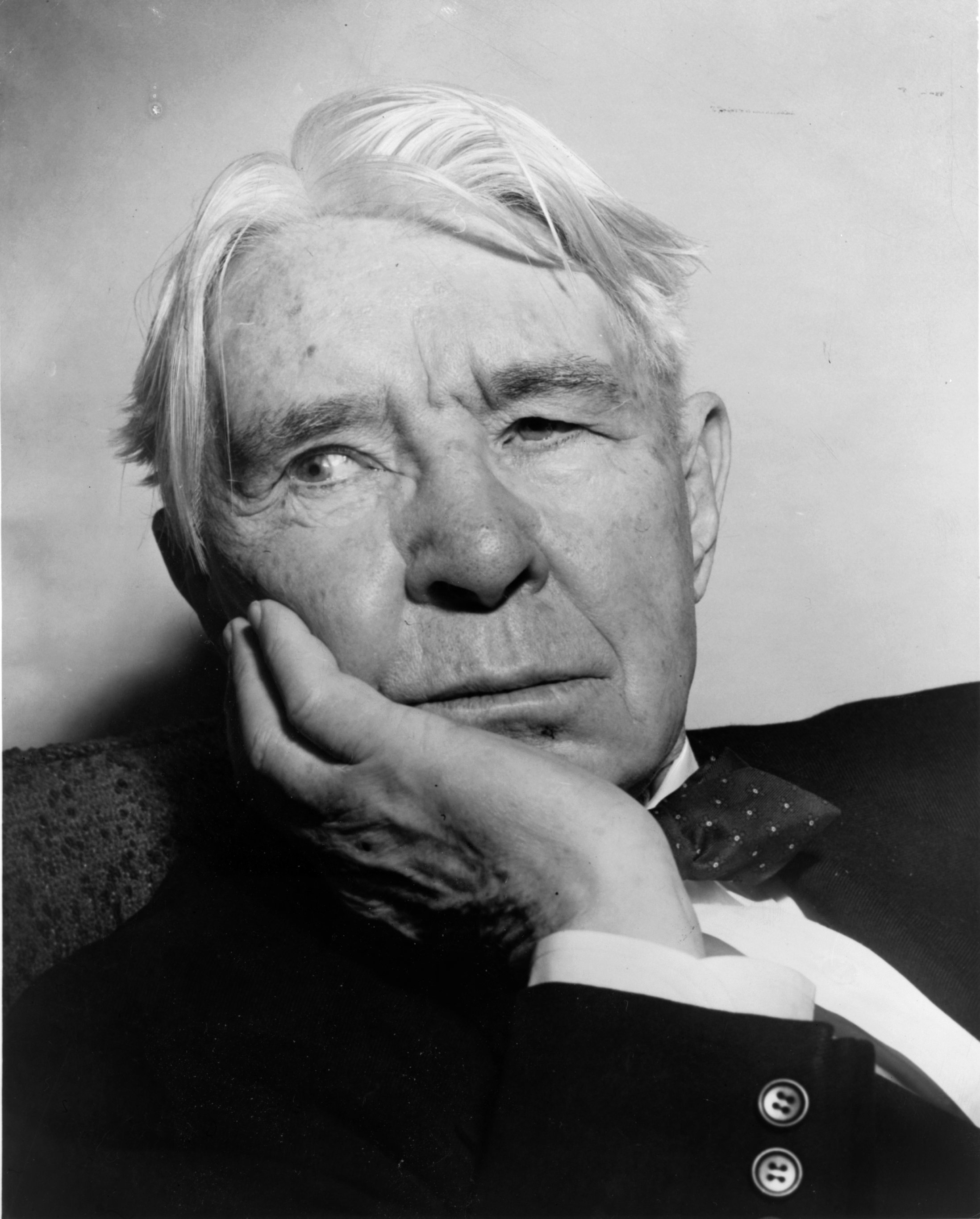
Carl Sandburg

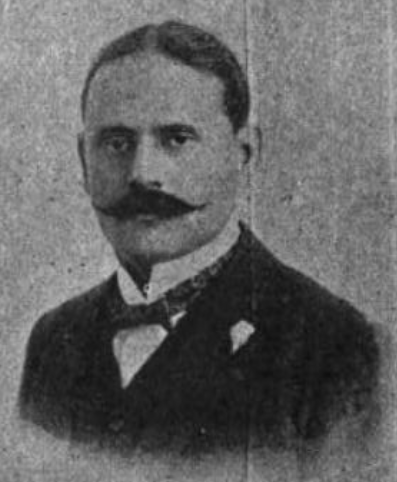
Shaikh Shahid Husain

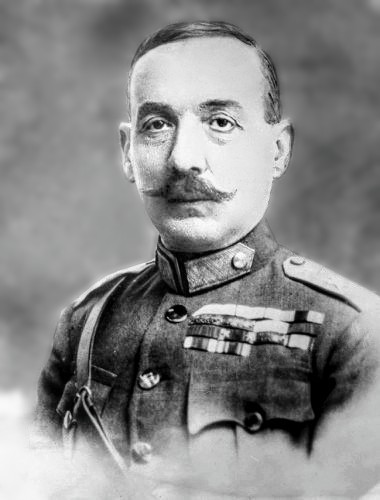
Theodoros Pangalos

=== January ===
- January 2 – Jaakko Mäki, Finnish politician (d. 1938)
- January 4
  - A. E. Coppard, English short story writer and poet (d. 1957)
  - Augustus John, Welsh painter (d. 1961)
- January 6 – Carl Sandburg, American poet and historian (d. 1967)
- January 8 – Shaikh Shahid Husain, Indian Barrister and the father of novelist Attia Hosain and Air Commodore FS Hussain (d. 1924)
- January 9 – John B. Watson, American psychologist (d. 1958)
- January 11
  - Theodoros Pangalos, Greek general, politician and President of Greece (d. 1952)
  - Leopoldo Saro, Spanish general (d. 1936)
- January 12 – Ferenc Molnár, Hungarian-born author (d. 1952)
- January 16 – Harry Carey, American actor (d. 1947)
- January 19 – Suzanne Noël, French plastic surgeon, the first female plastic surgeon in the world (d. 1954)
- January 20 – Finlay Currie, Scottish actor (d. 1968)
- January 22 – Constance Collier, English stage, screen actress (d. 1955)
- January 23 – Rutland Boughton, English composer (d. 1960)
- January 25 – Ernst Alexanderson, Swedish-born American television pioneer (d. 1975)
- January 26
  - Luís of Orléans-Braganza, Brazilian royalty
  - Harry Rountree, New Zealand illustrator (d. 1950)

=== February ===
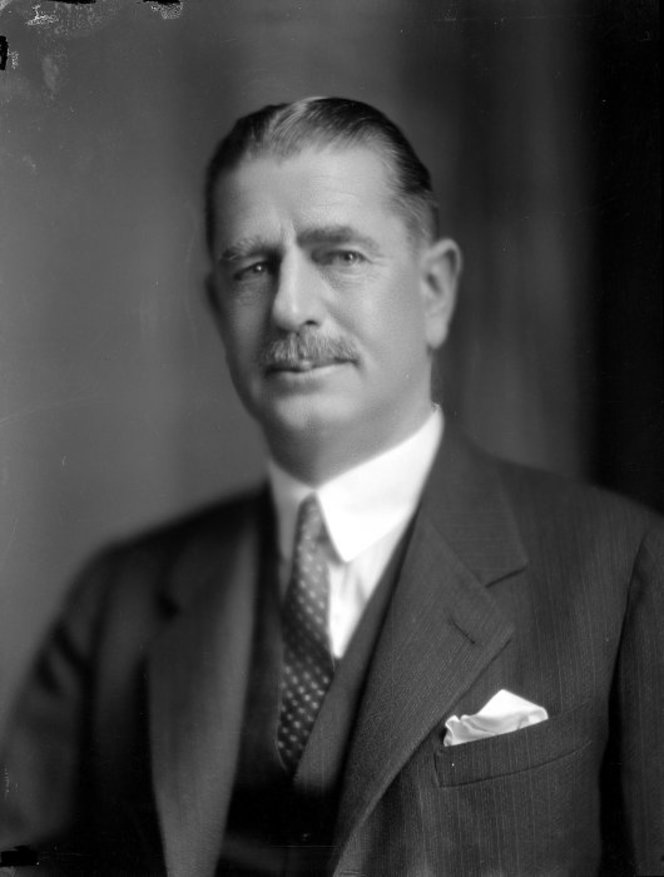
Gordon Coates

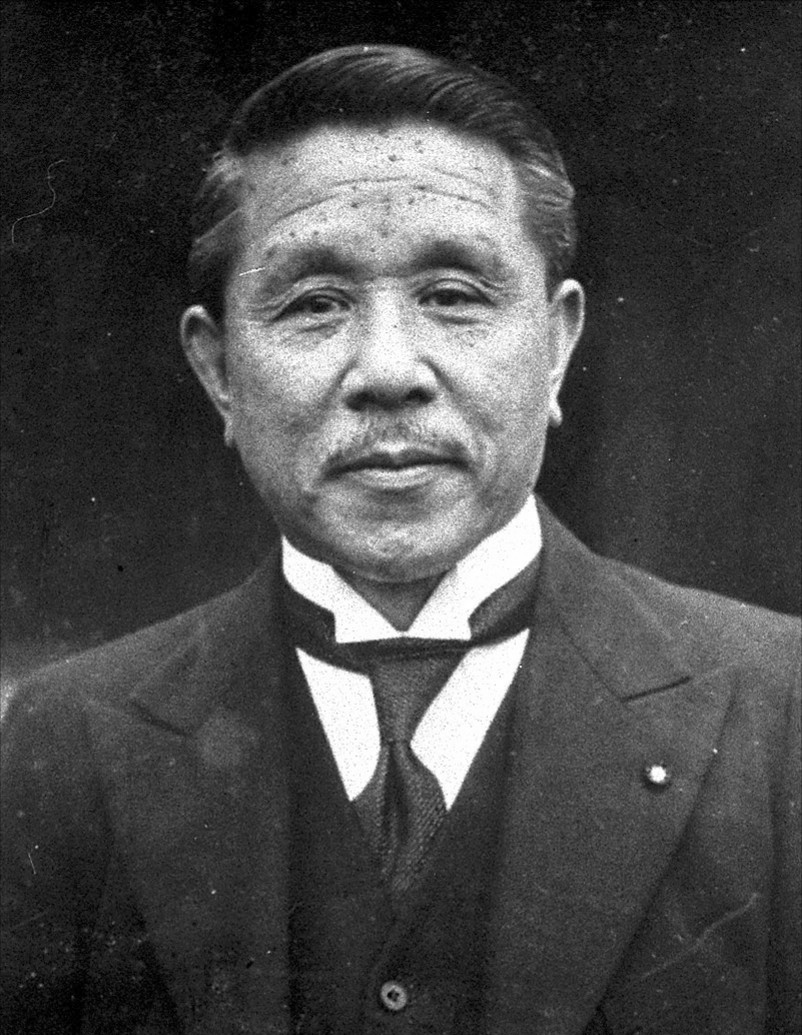
Kōki Hirota

- February 1 – Milan Hodža, Slovak politician, champion of regional integration in Europe (d. 1944)
- February 2
  - Alfréd Hajós, Hungarian swimmer, architect (d. 1955)
  - Katharine Martha Houghton Hepburn, American suffragist (d. 1951)
- February 3 – Gordon Coates, 21st Prime Minister of New Zealand (d. 1943)
- February 4 – Grigory Petrovsky, Ukrainian Soviet politician and Old Bolshevik (d. 1958)
- February 5 – André Citroën, French automobile manufacturer (d. 1935)
- February 8 – Martin Buber, Austrian philosopher (d. 1965)
- February 14 – Kōki Hirota, 21st Prime Minister of Japan (d. 1948)
- February 16 – Big Jim Colosimo, Italian-born American gangster (d. 1920)
- February 18 – Kate Gordon Moore, American psychologist (d. 1963)
- February 21 – Mirra Alfassa, multi-origined spiritual leader and founder of Auroville, India (d. 1973)
- February 26 – Emmy Destinn, Czech soprano (d. 1930)
- February 28 – Pierre Fatou, French mathematician (d. 1929)

=== March ===
- March 3 – Edward Thomas, British poet (d. 1917)
- March 4
  - Egbert Van Alstyne, American songwriter, pianist (d. 1951)
  - Arishima Takeo, Japanese novelist, short-story writer and essayist (d. 1923)
- March 5 – P. D. Ouspensky, Russian mathematician and philosopher (d. 1947)
- March 7 – Boris Kustodiev, Soviet painter and designer (d. 1927)
- March 16
  - Reza Shah Pahlavi, Shah of Iran (d. 1944)
  - Clemens August Graf von Galen, German Catholic cardinal (d. 1946)
- March 20 – Heinrich XXIV, Prince Reuss of Greiz (d. 1927)
- March 22 – Michel Théato, Luxembourg athlete (d. 1923)
- March 23 – Franz Schreker, Austrian composer (d. 1934)
- March 25 – Frances Glessner Lee, American forensic scientist; known as "mother of forensic science" (d. 1962)
- March 26 – Henry Gullett, Australian politician (d. 1940)
- March 31 – Jack Johnson, American boxer (d. 1946)

=== April ===
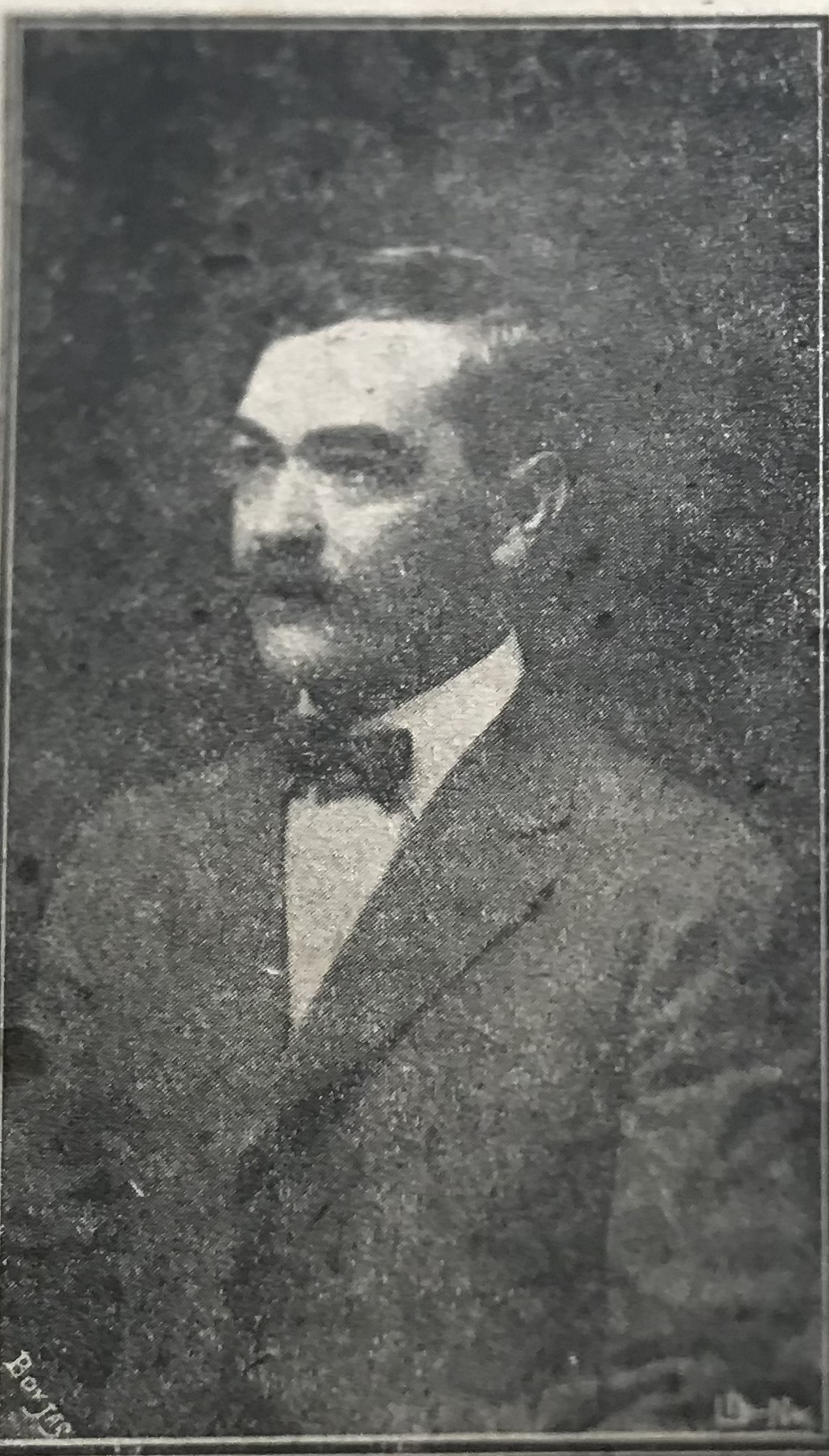
Vicente Mejía Colindres

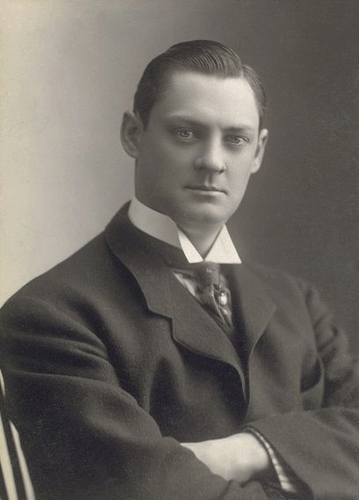
Lionel Barrymore

Roy Atwell

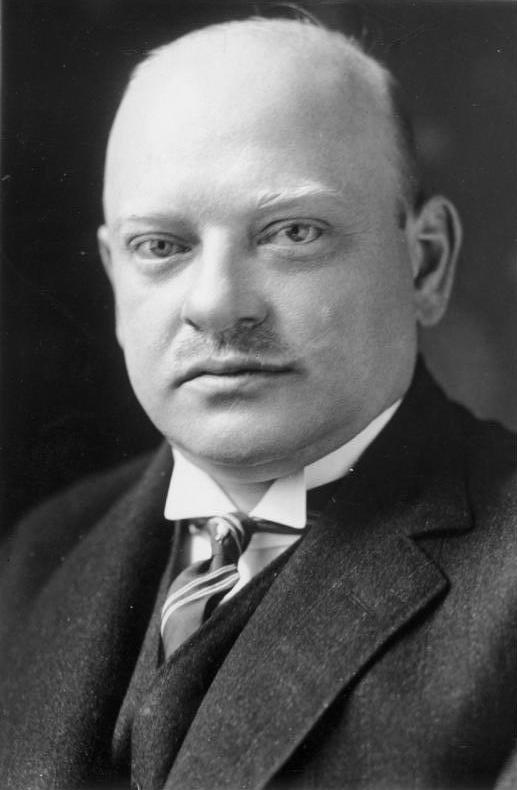
Gustav Stresemann

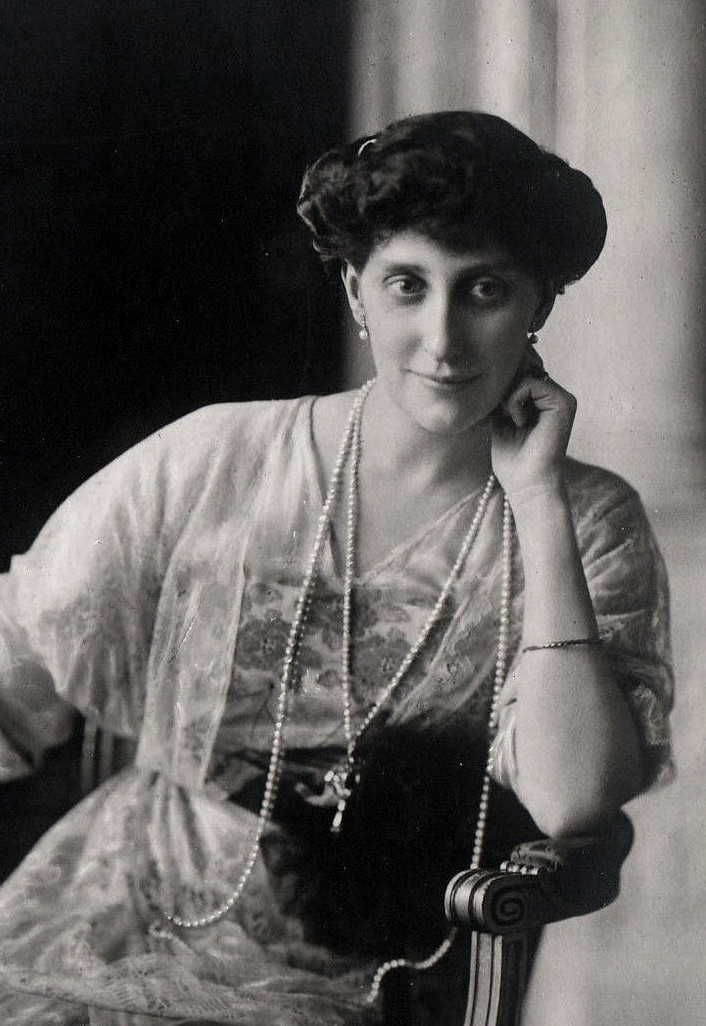
Princess Ingeborg of Denmark

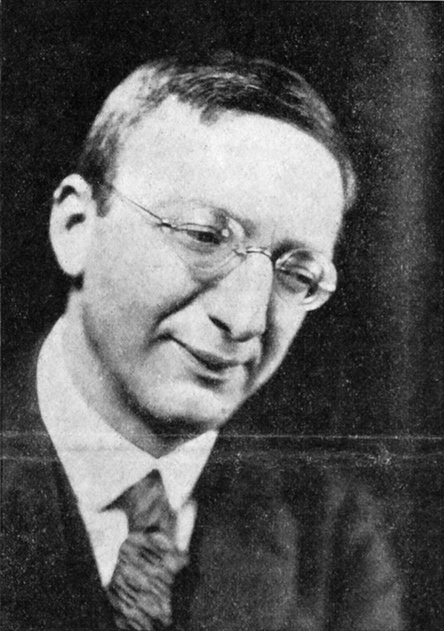
Alfred Döblin

- April 1 – C. Ganesha Iyer, Ceylon Tamil philologist (d. 1958)
- April 4 – Stylianos Lykoudis, Greek admiral (d. 1958)
- April 6
  - Erich Mühsam, German author (d. 1934)
  - Vicente Mejía Colindres, 23rd President of Honduras (d. 1966)
- April 24 – Jean Crotti, Swiss artist (d. 1958)
- April 28
  - Lionel Barrymore, American actor (d. 1954)
  - Willem Mengelberg, Dutch conductor (d. 1951)
- April 30 – Władysław Witwicki, Polish psychologist, philosopher, translator, historian (of philosophy and art) and artist (d. 1948)

=== May ===
- May 2 – Roy Atwell, American actor, comedian and composer (d. 1962)
- May 10 – Gustav Stresemann, Chancellor of Germany, recipient of the Nobel Peace Prize (d. 1929)
- May 13 – Julia Dean, American actress (d. 1952),
- May 16 – Taylor Holmes, American actor (d. 1959)
- May 17 – Conway Tearle, American actor (d. 1938)
- May 21 – Glenn Curtiss, American aviation pioneer (d. 1930)
- May 22 – The Great Gama, Punjabi wrestler (d. 1960)
- May 25 – Bill Robinson, African-American tap dancer (d. 1949)
- May 28 – Paul Pelliot, French sinologist (d. 1945)
- May 29 – Zelmira Segreda Solera de Cappella, Costa Rican soprano (d. 1923)

=== June ===
- June 1 – John Masefield, English poet, novelist (d. 1967)
- June 3 – Barney Oldfield, American automobile racer, pioneer (d. 1946)
- June 5 – Pancho Villa, Mexican revolutionary (d. 1923)
- June 10 – William Skelly, American oil magnate (d. 1957)
- June 12 – James Oliver Curwood, American writer, conservationist (d. 1927)
- June 19 – Yakov Yurovsky, Russian Old Bolshevik, revolutionary, and Chekist (d.1938)
- June 22 – John Burton Cleland, Australian naturalist, microbiologist, mycologist and ornithologist (d. 1971)
- June 27 – He Xiangning, Chinese revolutionary, feminist, politician, painter and poet (d. 1972)

=== July ===
- July 3 – George M. Cohan, American singer, dancer, composer, actor and writer (d. 1942)
- July 8 – Jimmy Quinn, Scottish footballer (d. 1945)
- July 16 – Andreas Hermes, German agricultural scientist, politician (d. 1964)
- July 24 – Lord Dunsany, Irish author (d. 1957)

=== August ===
- August 1
  - Konstantinos Logothetopoulos, Prime Minister of Greece (d. 1961)
  - José Pedro Montero, 27th President of Paraguay (d. 1927)
  - Eva Tanguay, Canadian-born vaudeville performer (d. 1947)
- August 2
  - Princess Ingeborg of Denmark, Princess of Sweden (d. 1958)
  - Aino Kallas, Finnish-Estonian author (d. 1956)
- August 9 – Eileen Gray, Irish architect, furniture designer (d. 1976)
- August 10 – Alfred Döblin, German writer (d. 1957)
- August 15 – Paa Grant, Ghanaian politician (d. 1956)
- August 19 – Manuel L. Quezon, 2nd President of the Philippines (d. 1944)
- August 20 – Maria Assunta Pallotta, Italian Roman Catholic religious professed and blessed (d. 1905)
- August 26 – Lina Stern, Soviet biochemist, physiologist and humanist (d. 1968)
- August 27 – Pyotr Wrangel, Russian general, anti-Bolshevik leader (d. 1928)
- August 28 – George Whipple, American scientist, recipient of the Nobel Prize in Physiology or Medicine (d. 1976)
- August 31 – Frank Jarvis, American athlete (d. 1933)

=== September ===
- September 1 – Leonhard Kaupisch, German general (d. 1945)
- September 2 – Werner von Blomberg, German field marshal (d. 1946)
- September 5 – Robert von Lieben, Austrian physicist (d. 1913)
- September 9
  - Sergio Osmeña, 4th President of the Philippines (d. 1961)
  - Princess Catherine Yurievskaya, daughter of Alexander II of Russia (d. 1959)
- September 13 – Matilde Moisant, American pilot (d. 1964)
- September 16 – Karl Albiker, German sculptor, lithographer and teacher (d. 1961)
- September 20 – Upton Sinclair, American writer (d. 1968)
- September 22 – Shigeru Yoshida, Prime Minister of Japan (d. 1967)
- September 24 – Charles-Ferdinand Ramuz, Swiss writer (d. 1947)
- September 26 – Kurt von Hammerstein-Equord, German general and Commander-in-Chief of the Reichswehr (d. 1943)
- September 28 – Jirō Tamon, Japanese general (d. 1934)

=== October ===
- October 1 – Othmar Spann, Austrian philosopher, economist (d. 1950)
- October 5 – Louise Dresser, American actress (d. 1965)
- October 9 – Robert Warwick, American actor (d. 1964)
- October 11 – Nicole Girard-Mangin, French physician in the French Army (d. 1919)
- October 12 – Karl Buresch, 9th Chancellor of Austria (d. 1936)
- October 15 – Paul Reynaud, 77th Prime Minister of France (d. 1966)
- October 16 – Maxie Long, American athlete (d. 1959)
- October 18 – Miguel Llobet, Spanish guitarist (d. 1938)
- October 26 – William Kissam Vanderbilt II, American motor racing driver and yachtsman (d. 1944)
- October 29 – Alexander von Falkenhausen, German general (d. 1966)
- October 30 – Arthur Scherbius, German electrical engineer, mathematician, cryptanalyst and inventor (d. 1929)

=== November ===
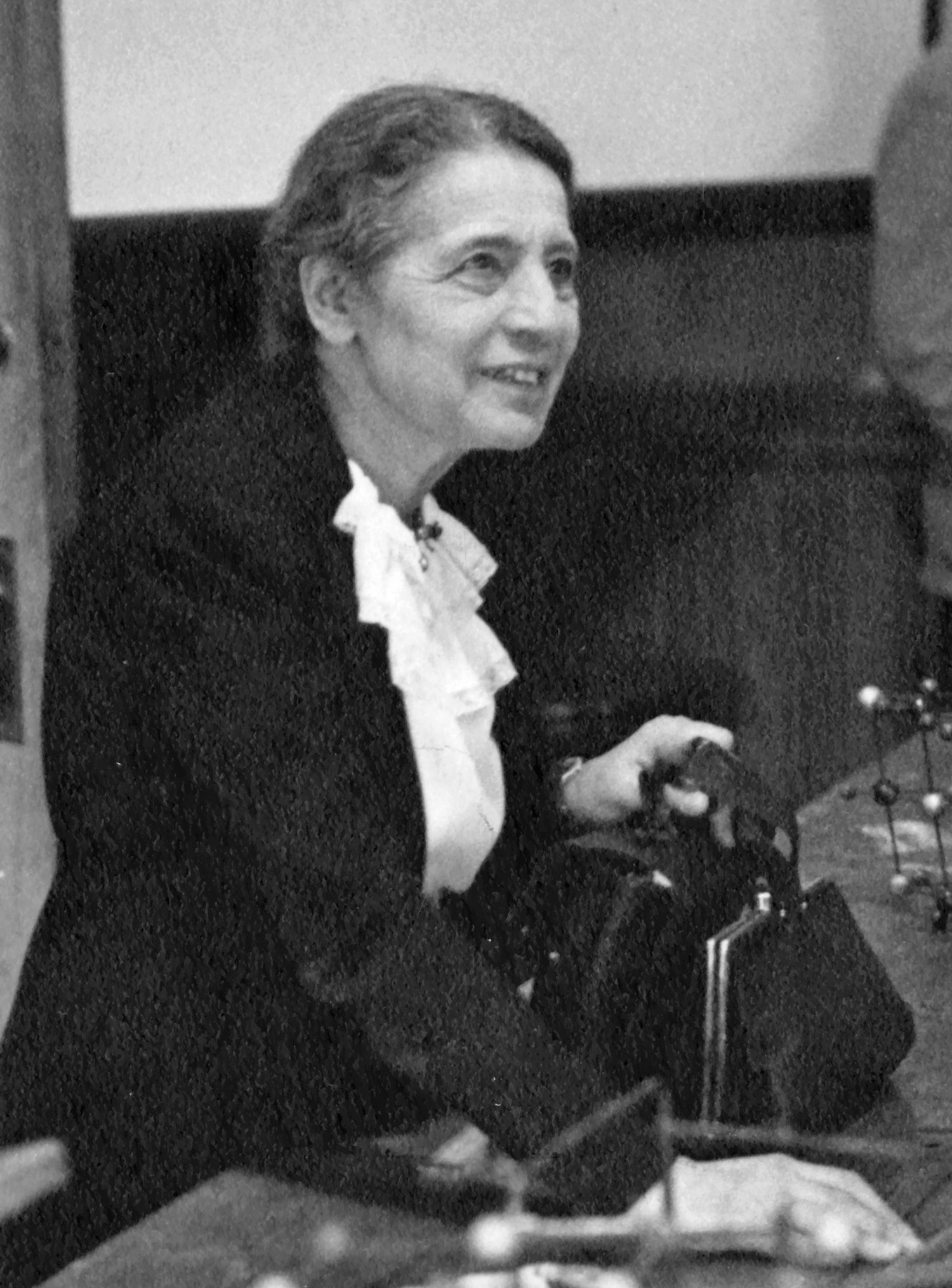
Lise Meitner

- November 1 – Carlos Saavedra Lamas, Argentine politician, recipient of the Nobel Peace Prize (d. 1959)
- November 7
  - Lise Meitner, German-Austrian physicist, discoverer of nuclear fission (d. 1968)
  - Margaret Cousins, Irish-Indian educationist, suffragist and Theosophist (d. 1954)
  - Avrohom Yeshaya Karelitz, Belarusian-born Orthodox rabbi (d. 1953)
- November 8 – Dorothea Bate, British archaeologist and pioneer of archaeozoology (d. 1951)
- November 14
  - Inigo Campioni, Italian admiral (d. 1944)
  - Julie Manet, French painter (d. 1966)
  - Leopold Staff, Polish poet (d. 1957)
- November 17 – Grace Abbott, American social worker, activist (d. 1939)
- November 23
  - Ernest Joseph King, Commander in Chief, United States Fleet and Chief of Naval Operations (COMINCH-CNO) during World War II (d. 1956)
  - Frank Pick, British transport administrator, designer (d. 1941)
- November 27 – William Orpen, Irish artist (d. 1931)

=== December ===
Joseph Stalin

- December 1 – Jeni Bojilova-Pateva, Bulgarian women's rights activist and suffragist (d. 1955)
- December 3 – Edith Vane-Tempest-Stewart, English noble (d. 1959)
- December 10 – C. Rajagopalachari, Indian politician, freedom fighter (d. 1972)
- December 18 – Joseph Stalin, leader of the Soviet Union (d. 1953)
- December 22 – Myer Prinstein, Polish-American athlete (d. 1925)
- December 25
  - Louis Chevrolet, Swiss-born race driver, automobile builder (d. 1941)
  - Joseph M. Schenck, Russian-born American film executive (d. 1961)
- December 28 – Nikolai Bryukhanov, Soviet statesman, political figure who served as People's Commissar of Finances (d. 1938)
- December 31
  - Elizabeth Arden, Canadian-born beautician, cosmetics entrepreneur (d. 1966)
  - Horacio Quiroga, Uruguayan writer (d. 1937)

== Deaths ==
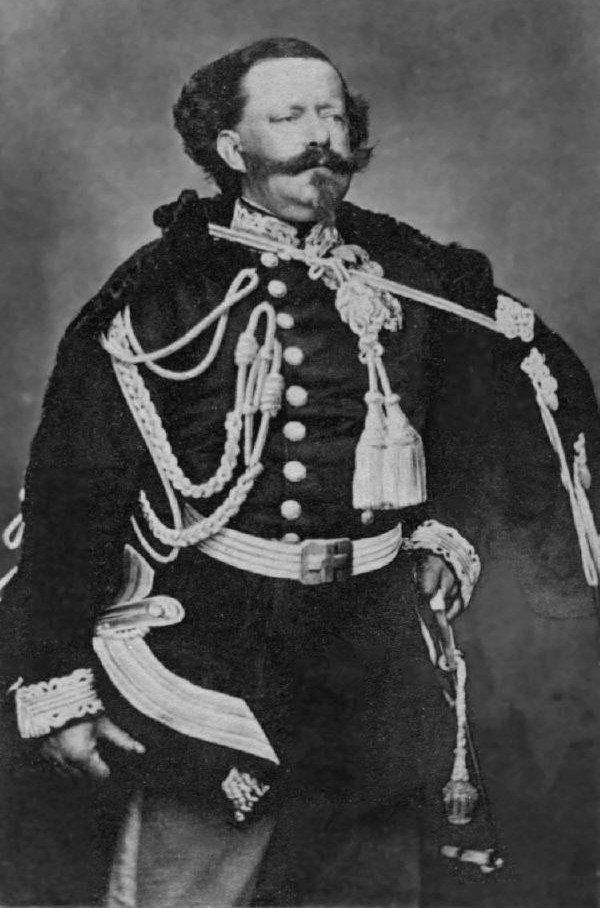
Victor Emmanuel II

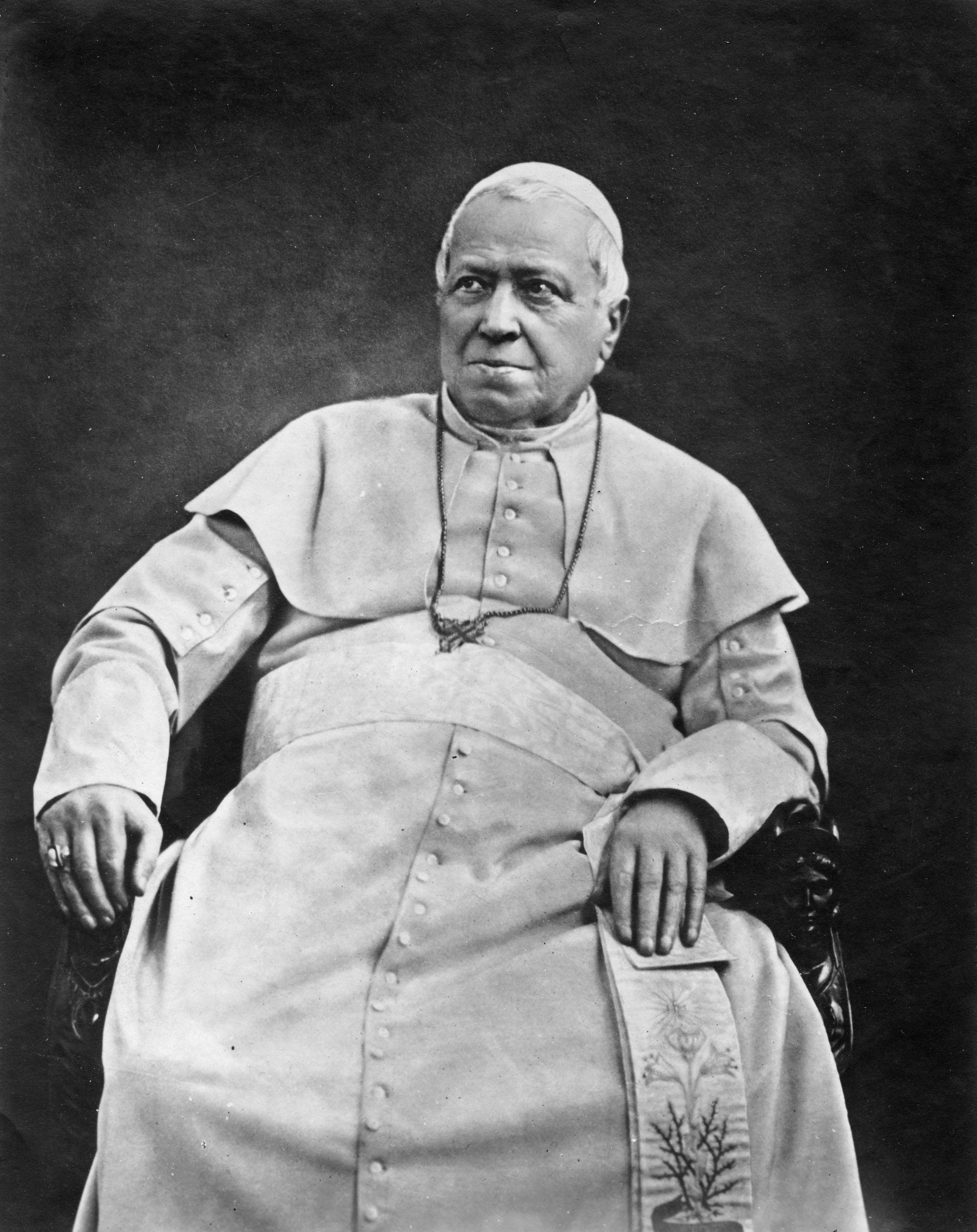
Pope Pius IX

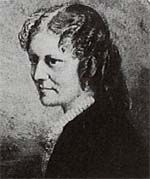
Anna Sewell

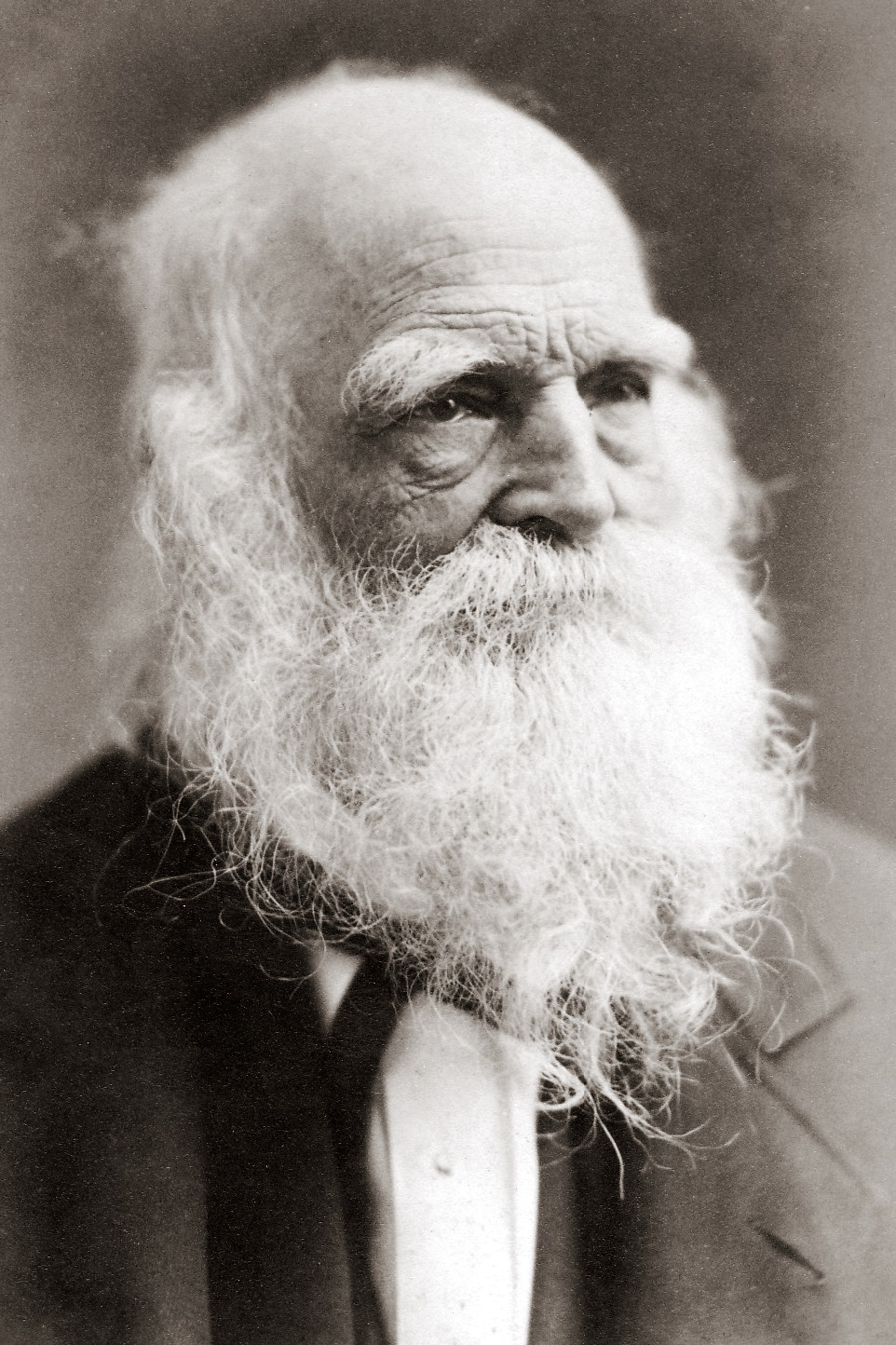
William Cullen Bryant

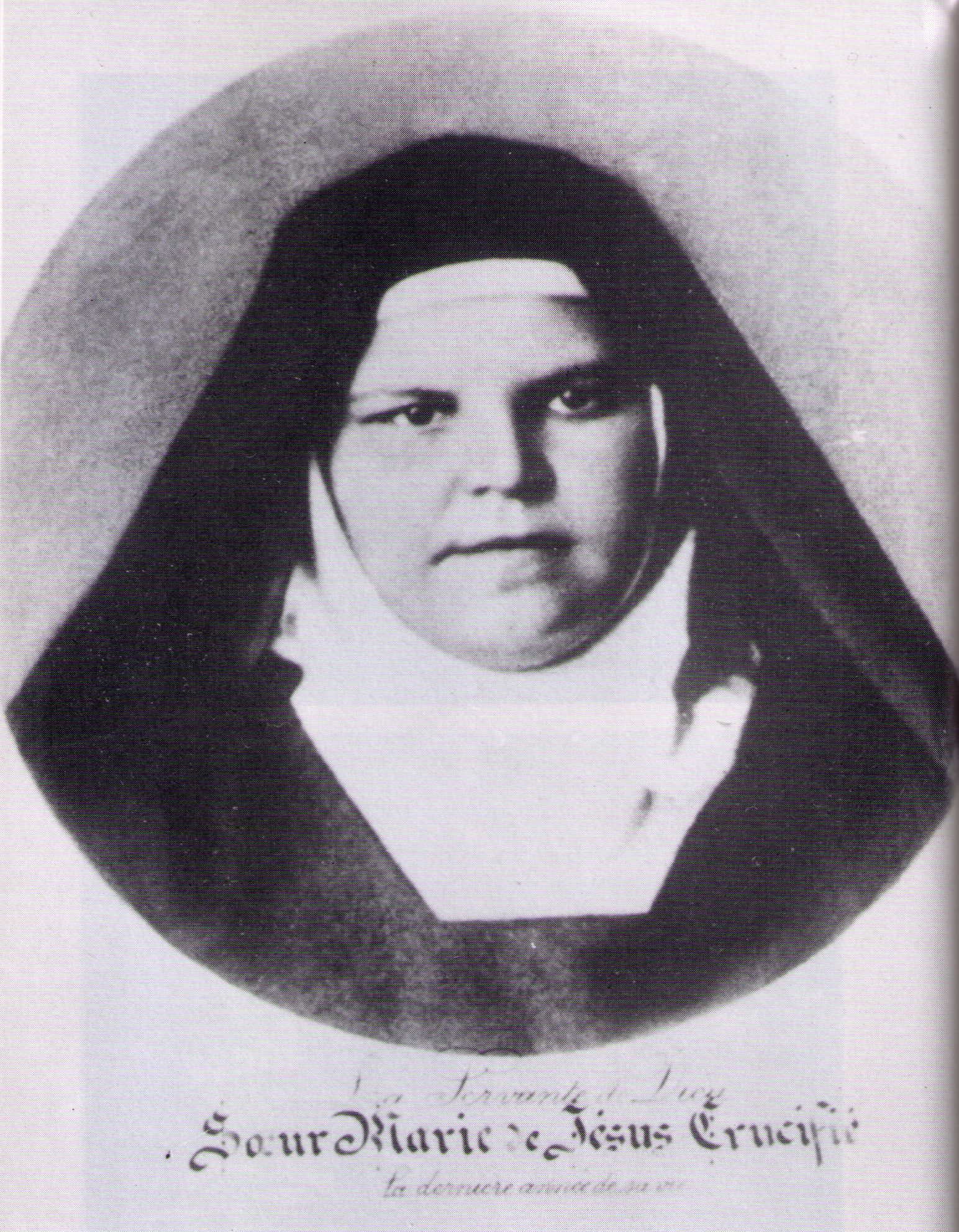
Saint Mariam Baouardy

=== January–June ===
- January 5 – Alfonso Ferrero La Marmora, 6th Prime Minister of Italy (b. 1804)
- January 8 – Nikolay Nekrasov, Russian poet (b. 1821)
- January 9 – King Victor Emmanuel II of Italy (b. 1820)
- January 18 – Antoine César Becquerel, French scientist (b. 1788)
- February 7 – Pope Pius IX (b. 1792)
- February 11 – Gideon Welles, American politician (b. 1802)
- February 19 – Charles-François Daubigny, French painter (b. 1817)
- February 26 – Angelo Secchi, Italian astronomer (b. 1818)
- March 8 – Archduke Franz Karl of Austria (b. 1802)
- March 20 – Julius von Mayer, German physician and physicist, a founder of thermodynamics (b. 1814)
- March 27 – Sir George Gilbert Scott, English architect (b. 1811)
- April 8 – Henrietta Treffz, Austrian soprano, first wife of Johann Strauss II (b. 1818)
- April 11 – Robert Wentworth Little, English occultist (b. 1840)
- April 12 – William M. Tweed, American politician (b. 1823)
- April 13 – Bezalel HaKohen, Russian rabbi (b. 1820)
- April 25 – Anna Sewell, English author (b. 1820)
- May 11 – Pierre Philippe Denfert-Rochereau, French military officer and politician (b. 1823)
- May 12 – Anselme Payen, French chemist (b. 1795)
- May 13 – Joseph Henry, American scientist (b. 1797)
- May 14 – Ōkubo Toshimichi, Japanese samurai, later leader of the Meiji restoration (b. 1830)
- May 28 – John Russell, 1st Earl Russell, Prime Minister of the United Kingdom (b. 1792)
- June 5 – Ernst von Bibra, German scientist (b. 1806)
- June 6
  - Achille Baraguey d'Hilliers, Marshal of France (b. 1795)
  - Robert Stirling, Scottish clergyman and inventor (b. 1790)
- June 12
  - William Cullen Bryant, American poet, journalist and editor (b. 1794)
  - Queen Cheorin, Korean queen consort (b. 1837)
  - George V of Hanover, deposed German king (b. 1819)
- June 15 – Shiv Dayal Singh, founder and first SatGuru of Radha Soami faith (b. 1818)
- June 27 – Sidney Breese, U.S. senator from Illinois, 'father of the Illinois Central Railroad' (b. 1800)

=== July–December ===
- July 21 – Sam Bass (outlaw), American outlaw (b. 1851)
- July 23 – Carl Freiherr von Rokitansky, Bohemian pathologist, philosopher and politician (b. 1804)
- August 13 – Henry James Montague, English-born actor (b. 1844)
- August 16 – Richard Upjohn, English-American architect (b. 1802)
- August 26 – Mariam Baouardy, Syrian Discalced Carmelite and Melkite Greek Catholic nun and saint, canonized (b. 1846)
- August 30 – James Geiss, English businessman (b. 1820)
- September 7 – Mehmed Ali Pasha, Prussian-born Ottoman military leader (b. 1827)
- October 4 – Dora Hand, dance hall singer, actress (b.1844)
- October 11 – Satanta, Kiowa war chief (b. 1820)
- December 10 – Henry Wells, American businessman (b. 1805)
- December 14 – Princess Alice of the United Kingdom (b. 1843)
- December 18 – W H Payne, actor and mime artist (b. 1804)
- December 23 – Frederick Aiken, American lawyer, journalist, and soldier (b. 1832)
- December 24 – Elizabeth Duncan Campbell, Scottish poet and autobiographical writer (b. 1804)
- December 25 – Henry K. Hoff, American admiral (b. 1809)
