= The Indian English Novel: Nation, History and Narration =

2019 book by Priyamvada Gopal

- Author: Priyamvada Gopal
- Language: English
- Series: Oxford Studies in Postcolonial Literatures
- Subjects: Indian literature, post-colonialism
- Publisher: Oxford University Press
- Publication date: 2009
- Publication place: United Kingdom
- Media type: Print
- Pages: xx + 209
- ISBN: 978 9 0420 2493 9

The Indian English Novel: Nation, History and Narration is a 2009 book by Priyamvada Gopal.

A work of literary history, the study traces the interrelationships between India's nationhood and its fiction from the mid-nineteenth century through the twentieth. Gopal argues that nineteenth-century Indian writers were influenced by British imperial claims that India lacked not only culture but specifically history, and that Anglophone Indian novels were strongly influenced by an impulse to resist this. Thus, notwithstanding the heterogeneity of Anglophone Indian novels, Gopal argues that they are connected by their concern to comment on and shape ideas of Indianness and of India. The book draws on novels that have been translated from Indian languages into English (prominently Bankimchandra Chatterjee's Anandamath and Rabindranath Tagore's The Home and the World), but focuses on works composed originally in English, whose status in India Gopal characterises as "rootless" yet also India's pan-national tongue.

== Contents ==
After presenting a detailed timeline including both literary and political events, the book includes the following chapters:

- Introduction: Ideas of India
- 1. Making English India
- 2. Ethnography, Gender, and Nation
- 3. Mahatma-Magic': Gandhi and Literary India
- 4. Writing Partition
- 5. Midnight's Legacies: Two Epic Novels of Nation
- 6. Bombay and the Novel
- 7. Family Matters: Domesticity and Gender
- 8. Imagining 'Origins': The Literature of Migration
- Conclusion: The Contemporary Scene

According to Sharon Pillai, "in format, each chapter of The Indian English Novel couples synoptic theme-centric surveys with more focused (though brief) analysis of a clutch of selected texts, rounded off by a short, supplementary list of works for further perusal." The earlier part of the book is largely chronological, whereas after the 1980s, Gopal's attempt to cover a large amount of writing leads to more cursory coverage, and she organises the book more by literary form, theme, and place.

The book discusses around forty novels. Most were written in what after 1948 became India, but some were composed in what became Pakistan and Bangladesh, and chapter 8 especially focuses on writing by the Indian diaspora, including Bharati Mukherjee, M. G. Vassanji, V. S. Naipaul and Hanif Kureishi's The Buddha of Suburbia. Other works and writers that get particular attention include Khushwant Singh's Train To Pakistan, Salman Rushdie's Midnight’s Children, Shama Futehally's Tara Lane, Rohinton Mistry's Such a Long Journey, Mumtaz Shah Nawaz's The Heart Divided, Amitav Ghosh's The Hungry Tide, Lal Behari Dey's Govinda Samanta, Anita Desai's Baumgartner's Bombay, Mukul Kesavan's Looking Through Glass, Vikram Seth's A Suitable Boy, Kiran Nagarkar's Ravan and Eddie, Attia Hosain's Sunlight on a Broken Column, and Githa Hariharan's In Times of Siege.

== Reception ==
In the view of Dieter Riemenschneider, the book "serves well its purported aim to introduce a 'regional' literature by offering a broad survey combined with close analyses of a large number of texts". He also noted that "the author’s familiarity with the 19th- and early 20th-century novel is particularly informative since past critics frequently merely quoted from K. R. S. Iyengar's pioneering literary history Indian Writing in English".

Reviewers praised Gopal's inclusion of writers and texts little known outside India, such as Bhabani Bhattacharya's He Who Rides a Tiger, Nayantara Sahgal, Shashi Tharoor, and Mukul Kesavan.

Sharon Pillai argued that

Gopal is at her best when reading novels for the many ways in which they counter or consolidate the national hegemonic. [...] There are, however, a few caveats to go with the recommendations for The Indian English Novel. [...] Nationalist and majoritarian identity-politics is excoriated and deconstructed in sensitive and sophisticated terms in Gopal’s book. Yet, the moment the positions are reversed and the usual victims become victimizers, as in Siddharth Deb’s Point of Return, there are appeals made to history as extenuating circumstance [...] Such moves are seldom anything but disingenuous and unconvincing.
