= Hostile environment =

A hostile environment may refer to:-

- Home Office hostile environment policy in the United Kingdom
- A hostile work environment under United States labour law
- Hostile Environment, an album by Rasco
- Hostile Environment: How Immigrants Became Scapegoats, a 2019 book
- Hostile Environment and Emergency First Aid Training
