= E. A. Markham =

British writer and academic (1939–2008)

Archie Markham FRSL
- Born: Edward Archibald Markham; 1 October 1939; Harris, Montserrat
- Died: 23 March 2008 (aged 68); Paris, France
- Education: University of Wales, Lampeter; University of East Anglia
- Occupations: Poet, playwright, novelist
- Writing career
- Pen name: Paul St. Vincent; Sally Goodman
- Notable works: Lambchops (1985), Human Rites (1984), Looking Out, Looking In (2008)

Edward Archibald Markham FRSL (1 October 1939 – 23 March 2008), popularly known as Archie Markham, was a Montserratian poet, playwright, novelist and academic. He moved to the United Kingdom in 1956, where he remained for most of his life, writing as well as teaching at various academic institutions. He was known for writing subtle, witty and intelligent poetry, which refused to conform to the conventions, and stereotypes, of British and Caribbean poetry alike.

== Life ==
E. A. Markham was born into a large, middle-class family in Harris, Montserrat, in 1939. He attended the only grammar school on the island, before emigrating to the UK at the age of 17. In the UK, Markham read English and Philosophy at the University of Wales, Lampeter, from 1962 to 1965. He subsequently went on to research 17th-century comedy at the University of East Anglia, before taking up his first academic position as a lecturer at Kilburn Polytechnic (now the College of North West London).

On leaving Kilburn Polytechnic, Markham founded the Caribbean Theatre Workshop, which aimed to explore "non-naturalistic ways of writing and playing", and which he led on a successful tour of Montserrat, Saint Vincent and other parts of the Eastern Caribbean in 1970–71. Shortly after his return from the tour, Markham left for France, where he worked, building houses with a French co-operative movement (the Cooperative Ouvrière du Batiment) in the Alpes-Maritimes, from 1972 to 1974.

On returning to the UK, he joined a touring group called the Bluefoot Travellers, and was awarded a series of writing fellowships at Hull College (1978–79), in Brent, London (on a C. Day-Lewis Fellowship from 1979 to 1980), Ipswich (1986), and at the University of Ulster (1988–91). He also worked as an active member of numerous literary groups and committees, including the Poetry Book Society, the Poetry Society (General Council, 1976–77) and the Minority Arts Advisory Service (MAAS), whose magazine, Artrage, he edited from 1985 to 1987.

In a long itinerant period, he took a Voluntary Service Overseas position for two years (1983–85) in Papua New Guinea, working as media co-ordinator for the provincial authorities in Enga province. He would later recall this experience in his memoir, A Papua New Guinea Sojourn (1993). In 1997, he took up the position of Professor of Creative Writing at Sheffield Hallam University, where he co-founded the MA in creative writing and directed the biennial Hallam Literature Festival.

On the occasion of his 60th birthday, Sheffield Hallam published A Festschrift for E. A. Markham (1999), and in 2005, when Markham retired, the university made him an emeritus professor. He was awarded the Certificate of Honour by the government of Montserrat, in 1997; and was elected as a Fellow of the Royal Society of Literature in 2003.

In 2005, Markham moved to Paris, France. He died there, of a heart attack on Easter day, 23 March 2008, aged 68.

== Poetry and other works ==
Although Markham is mainly known for his poetry, he worked in many artistic genres across the years, producing plays, short stories, a novel and an autobiography as well as multiple collections of poetry. He found his first "artistic outlet" in drama, writing and producing a play called The Masterpiece while still at university in the early 1960s.

A defining characteristic of Markham's work is his tireless exploration of multiple voices and perspectives. In a short introduction to his work entitled "Many Voices, Many Lives" (1989), he wrote: "The dramatic revelation that poets [...] in the Caribbean had two voices – nation language and Standard English – released many energies; but we had to be sure that this wasn't to be interpreted that we had only two voices, only two modes of expression [...] I was interested in testing the whole range of voices [...] that were possibly real for me"

As part of his exploration of multiple personae, Markham often published his works under pseudonyms. In the 1970s, Markham wrote a series of poems (including Lambchops, Lampchops in Disguise and Philpot in the City) in the fictional personae of Paul St. Vincent – a young, black man from Antigua, living in South London – and these poems were published in St. Vincent's name. Unlike much of Markham's poetry, the Paul St. Vincent poems are mainly written in nation language. Later, in the 1980s, Markham wrote through the fictional persona of Sally Goodman: a white, Welsh feminist. Some of the "Sally Goodman" poems were later anthologised in Markham's collection Living in Disguise. He argued that in inventing these multiple personae, "the test was to force their creator to accommodate types of consciousness which, at the very least, served to enlarge one area of Westindianness".

Markham's writing in genres other than poetry – the short story, the novel, autobiography and travel-writing – was well received by critics. In addition to his creative writing, Markham also edited two important anthologies of Caribbean writing: Hinterland: Caribbean Poetry from the West Indies and Britain (1979) and The Penguin Book of Caribbean Short Stories (1996).

== Bibliography ==
=== Poetry ===
- Crossfire (1972)
- Mad and Other Poems (1973)
- Love Poems and Maze (1978)
- The Lamp (1978)
- Masterclass (1979)
- Games and Penalties (1980)
- Love, Politics and Food (1982)
- Family Matters (1984)
- Human Rites: Selected Poems 1970–1982 (1984)
- Lambchops in Papua New Guinea (1986)
- Living In Disguise (1986)
- Towards the End of a Century (1989)
- Maurice V.'s Dido (1991)
- Letter from Ulster and the Hugo Poems (1993)
- Misapprehensions (1995)
- Fragments of Memory (2000)
- A Rough Climate (2002), T. S. Eliot Prize shortlist
- John Lewis & Co (2003)
- The Selected Poems of Paul St. Vincent and Sally Goodman
- Looking Out, Looking In (2008)

As Paul St. Vincent

- Lambchops (1976)
- Lambchops in Disguise (1976)
- Philpot in the City (1976)

=== Novels and short stories ===
- Pierrot (1979)
- Something Unusual (1986),
- Ten Stories (1994)
- Marking Time (1999)
- Taking the Drawing Room Through Customs: Selected Stories 1970–2000 (2002)
- Dennis, Ferdinand; Khan, Naseem, eds. (2000). Voices of the Crossing. London: Serpent's Tail. pp. 5–18. ISBN 9781852425838.

=== Autobiography and travel writing ===
- A Papua New Guinea Sojourn: More Pleasures of Exile (1998)
- Against the Grain (2007)

=== Edited collections ===
- Hinterland: Caribbean Poetry from the West Indies and Britain (1989), editor. Newcastle-Upon-Tyne: Bloodaxe Books
- Hugo versus Montserrat (1989), for hurricane relief, edited with Howard Fergus
- The Penguin Book of Caribbean Short Stories (1996), editor
