= Hostile Environment: How Immigrants Became Scapegoats =

2019 non-fiction book

- Front cover of 2020 edition
- Author: Maya Goodfellow
- Subject: Immigration policy of the United Kingdom
- Publisher: Verso Books
- Publication date: November 2019; August 2020
- Pages: 272 (2019 edition); 320 (2020 edition)
- ISBN: 978-1-78873-960-3 (Note: ISBN given for the 2020 edition. The 2019 edition has ISBN 978-1-78873-336-6.)

Hostile Environment: How Immigrants Became Scapegoats is a 2019 book by the British academic Maya Goodfellow about the immigration policy of the United Kingdom from the 1960s onwards, including the "hostile environment" policy of the 2010s. Goodfellow argues against the policy and in favour of increased rights for migrants. The book received a positive critical reception.

== Background ==
External videos
- "Britain's hostile environment" Goodfellow summarises her view on the hostile environment.
- "Climate migration" Goodfellow discusses future migration of people due to climate change.

Maya Goodfellow is an academic studying race, racism and immigration; she received her PhD from SOAS University of London. As a journalist, she has written for publications including The New York Times and The Guardian. Goodfellow was inspired to write Hostile Environment after the 2016 Brexit vote, where she observed a narrative that the U.K. was becoming something new or that the inhospitality to immigrants was new. Goodfellow wished to investigate the history of immigration in the U.K. and dispel this narrative.

The book was published in November 2019. A second edition with an additional chapter was published in August 2020.

== Synopsis ==
The book follows immigration policy and political discourse around immigration in the U.K. from the 1960s to the 2010s, through Labour and Conservative governments. The "hostile environment" policy, including the Immigration Act 2014 and Immigration Act 2016, is discussed. These laws made people without proof of legal status unable to get a job, healthcare or housing. Goodfellow finds that centre-left governments such as New Labour made immigration laws more stringent, and that politicians who advocated for the U.K. to remain in the European Union in the Brexit referendum, such as the Conservative Prime Minister David Cameron, criminalised and scapegoated immigration.

Goodfellow argues that forms of racism, such as dehumanisation, resulted from policy changes. She says that little public discussion focuses on the difficulty of being an immigrant or refugee. Goodfellow draws links to colonialism and later imperialism practiced by the United Kingdom. Additionally, the book covers the effects of climate change by region—areas which contributed the least greenhouse gases are the most affected. Climate change is causing the displacement of people from their homes, known as environmental migrants.

Goodfellow outlines policy proposals she thinks would address the issues discussed, such as closing immigration detention centres, migrant suffrage and reversing "hostile environment" policies. In the 2020 edition, a final chapter about the 2019 United Kingdom general election and COVID-19 pandemic, as they relate to immigration. Interviews with politicians, immigration lawyers and asylum seekers inform the book throughout.

== Reception ==
The book was one of twelve on the longlist for the Jhalak Prize in 2020, which is given to ethnic minority writers in the U.K.

Elsa Maishman of The Scotsman reviewed that the book was both an exploration of immigration history, which is particularly critical of perceived hypocrisy of left-wing anti-immigration politics, and a "call to arms" over how to move forwards on the topic of immigration. Maishman found the factual content "thoughtful and eye-opening" and the book overall "thorough and even-handed".

Writing for The Guardian, Labour MP David Lammy lauded the book as "one of the most profound deconstructions" of its subject matter, praising the emotion of the "raw experiences" and Goodfellow's ability to use first-hand stories to turn "outrage into action".

David Wearing of New Humanist found it "simple but urgently necessary" that Goodfellow gives accounts of migrant's stories and perspectives throughout the book, treating them as "ordinary people with their own legitimate concerns". He reviewed it as a good companion to Priyamvada Gopal's Insurgent Empire (2019). Current History's Bridget Anderson praised the writing as "passionate and compelling", positively reviewing the fact that Goodfellow discusses both the present and her desired future, and E.U. migration as well as colonial migration.
