= Farmers' Almanac =

Annual American periodical

- Cover of the 2019 Farmers' Almanac
- Editor: Sandi Duncan
- Former editors: Peter Geiger; Ray Geiger; William Jardine; Berlin Hart Wright; Samuel Hart Wright; David Young
- Categories: Almanacs
- Frequency: Annually
- Publisher: Almanac Publishing Company
- First issue: 1818; 208 years ago
- Company: Geiger
- Country: United States
- Language: English
- Website: farmersalmanac.com
- ISSN: 0737-6731

Farmers' Almanac is an annual American periodical that has been in continuous publication since 1818. Published by Geiger of Lewiston, Maine, the Farmers' Almanac provides long-range weather predictions for both the U.S. and Canada. The periodical also provides calendars and articles on topics such as full moon dates, folklore, natural remedies, and the best days to do various outdoor activities.

Each new year's edition is released at the end of August of the previous year and contains 16 months of weather predictions broken into 7 zones for the continental U.S., as well as seasonal weather maps for the winter and summer ahead.

The publication follows in the heritage of American almanacs such as Benjamin Franklin’s Poor Richard's Almanack.

The Farmers' Almanac will cease production after the current 2026 edition.

== History ==
Founded in 1818, the Farmers’ Almanac mixes a blend of long-range weather predictions, humor, fun facts, and advice on gardening, cooking, fishing, conservation, and other topics.

The Farmers’ Almanac has had seven editors. Poet, astronomer, and teacher David Young held the post for 34 years starting from when he and publisher Jacob Mann first founded The Almanac Publishing Company in Morristown, New Jersey. Following Young's death in 1852, astronomer Samuel Hart Wright became editor.

In 1933, Ray Geiger took over as the sixth editor of the Farmers’ Almanac and began what became the longest-running editorship in Farmers’ Almanac history.

In 1994, Ray's son Peter became editor. Sondra "Sandi" Duncan became Managing Editor with him and then succeeded as editor with Peter Geiger titled "editor emeritus" in the final years. Sandi was the first female editor in 178 years to hold an editorial position.

In 1997, an online version was created at FarmersAlmanac.com. The Almanac has over 1.2 million followers on Facebook, and is also on Twitter, Instagram, Pinterest, TikTok and other social media sites.

Farmers' Almanac announced in November 2025 that it will cease production after the now-available 2026 edition. Its editors announced that due to the "growing financial challenges of producing and distributing the Almanac in today’s chaotic media environment", the 2026 issue would be its last, with its website planning to shut down in December 2025. The publication was acquired by a newly formed company called Farmers’ Almanac LLC, which announced plans to relaunch it in March 2026. The company is led by Tim Konrad, owner of the media company Unofficial Networks.

== Weather prediction ==
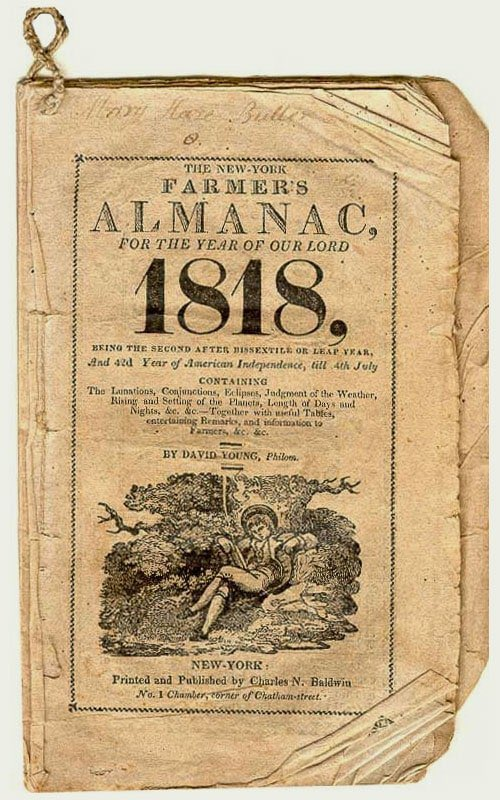
The first edition of the Farmers' Almanac, from 1818

Predictions for each edition are made as far as two years in advance. The U.S. retail edition of the Farmers' Almanac contains weather predictions for 7 U.S. climatic zones, defined by the publishers, in the continental United States, broken into 3-day intervals. Seasonal maps and summaries for each season are also shared in each new edition, as are forecasts for annual sporting events. Predictions cover 16 months, from the previous September (through December of the publication year).

The Farmers' Almanac will only state publicly that their method is an "exclusive mathematical and astronomical formula, that relies on sunspot activity, tidal action, planetary position (astrology) and many other factors". The Almanac's forecaster is referred to by the pseudonym Caleb Weatherbee. According to the publishers, the true identity of the forecaster is kept secret to prevent them from being "badgered".

=== Accuracy ===
Publishers claim that "many longtime Almanac followers claim that their forecasts are 80% to 85% accurate" on their website. Their website also contains a list of the many more "famous" weather predictions they have accurately forewarned of and like to point out that they have been predicting the weather longer than the National Weather Service.

Most scientific analyses of the accuracy of Farmers' Almanac forecasts have shown a 50% rate of accuracy, which is higher than that of groundhog prognostication, a folklore method of forecasting. USA Today states that "according to numerous media analyses neither the Old Farmer's Almanac nor the Farmers' Almanac gets it right".

== Notable articles ==
Most editions of the Farmers' Almanac include a "human crusade," advocating for a change in some accepted social practice or custom. Previous crusades have included: "How Much Daylight Are We Really Saving," a recommendation for a revised Daylight Saving Time schedule (2007); "Why is Good Service So Hard to Schedule," recommending that service providers offer more specific timeframes when scheduling home visits (2006); "A Kinder, Gentler Nation," urging readers to exercise more common courtesy (2003); "Saturday: The Trick to Making Halloween a Real Treat," advocating that the observance of Halloween be moved to the last Saturday in October (1999); "A Cure for Doctors' Office Delays," demanding more prompt medical service and calling for a "Patients' Bill of Rights" (1996); and "Pennies Make No Sense," which sought to eliminate the penny, and to permanently replace the dollar bill with less costly-to-produce dollar coins (1989).

Other pieces that have attracted attention over the years include:

- Farmers' Almanac's 2010 list of the "5 Worst Weather Cities", which elicited a call for retraction from syracuse.com after naming Syracuse, New York, the worst winter weather city.
- The 2014 Winter Outlook, which called for a winter storm to hit just about the time Super Bowl XLVIII was to be played at MetLife Stadium in New Jersey (no such storm materialized, and the weather was actually warmer than average at the time of the event). However, a major winter storm did strike the area the day after the game.
- The 2001 campaign to name an official National Dessert (readers resoundingly responded in favor of traditional apple pie).
