= Ferdinand Dennis =

British writer, journalist and broadcaster (born 1956)

Ferdinand Dennis FRSL
- Born: 18 March 1956 (age 70); Kingston, Jamaica
- Education: Leicester University (1975–78); Birkbeck College, London University (1978–79)
- Occupations: Writer, journalist and broadcaster
- Notable work: Behind the Frontlines: Journey into Afro-Britain (1988); The Sleepless Summer (1989); The Last Blues Dance (1996); Duppy Conqueror (1998)
- Awards: 1988 Martin Luther King Memorial Prize

Ferdinand Dennis FRSL (born 18 March 1956) is a writer, broadcaster, journalist and lecturer, who is Jamaican by birth but at the age of eight moved to England, where his parents had migrated in the late 1950s. Dr James Procter notes: "Perhaps as a result of his Caribbean background (a region probably marked more than any other by movements and migration), Dennis is a writer ultimately more concerned with routes than roots. This is foregrounded in much of his fictional work, notably his most recent and ambitious novel to date, Duppy Conqueror (1998), a novel which moves from 1930s Jamaica to postwar London and Liverpool, to Africa. Similarly, Dennis' non-fiction centres on journeying rather than arrival, from Behind the Frontlines: Journey into Afro-Britain (1988) to Voices of the Crossing: The Impact of Britain on Writers from Asia, the Caribbean and Africa (2000)."

== Biography ==
Ferdinand Dennis was born on 28 March 1956 in Kingston, Jamaica, and grew up in north Paddington, London, where he and his siblings – two brothers and a sister – relocated in 1964 to join their parents.

Dennis read sociology at Leicester University (1975–78), after which he was employed as an educational researcher in Handsworth, Birmingham. He studied for a master's degree at Birkbeck College, London University (1978–79). In 1991, he was made Honorary Research Fellow at Birkbeck. He received a Wingate Scholarship in 1995. He has lectured in Nigeria, and from 2003 to 2011 taught Creative and Media Writing courses at Middlesex University.

As a broadcaster, he has written and presented numerous talks and documentaries for BBC Radio 4 – such as the series After Dread and Anger (1989), Journey Round My People, for which he travelled in West Africa, Back To Africa (1990) and Work Talk (1991–92; conversations with black people living in Britain, including Diane Abbott, Valerie Amos, Emeka Anyaoku, Norman Beaton, Winston Branch, Margaret Busby, Merle Collins, Val McCalla, and Josette Simon, produced by Marina Salandy-Brown) – as well as a television programme about Africa for Channel 4.

Dennis has also worked as a journalist for publications including Frontline and City Limits magazines. His writing has been published in a range of magazines, newspapers and anthologies, among them The Guardian, Granta, Critical Quarterly, Black British Culture and Society: A Text Reader (ed. Kwesi Owusu, 2000), Hurricane Hits England: An Anthology of Writing About Black Britain (ed. Onyekachi Wambu, 2000), and IC3: The Penguin Book of New Black Writing in Britain (2000).

With Naseem Khan, Dennis co-edited Voices of the Crossing: The Impact of Britain on Writers from Asia, the Caribbean and Africa (2000). He also was a co-researcher (with Kole Omotoso and Alfred Zack-Williams) of the 1992 compilation West Africa Over 75 Years: selections from the raw material of history, edited by Kaye Whiteman.

Dennis is the author of three novels – The Sleepless Summer (1989), The Last Blues Dance (1996); and Duppy Conqueror (1998) – and two travelogues: Behind the Frontlines: Journey into Afro-Britain (1988) – his first book, which won the Martin Luther King Memorial Prize – and Back to Africa: A Journey (1992), in which he visited Cameroon, Ghana, Guinea, Sierra Leone, Liberia, Nigeria and Senegal. In 2021, his collection of short stories written over five decades, The Black and White Museum, came out from HopeRoad Publishers.

Dennis was elected to the management committee of the Society of Authors in October 2017, to serve for a three-year term.

== Critical reception ==
Dennis's first novel, The Sleepless Summer (1989), is said to enjoy "cult status in Britain's African-Caribbean community", while his second, The Last Blues Dance (1996), is described as "Warm, humorous, poignant... a wonderfully engaging novel that weaves together the lives of a rich cast of characters, creating a sense of both community and individuality, tenderness and suspense."

In praise of 1998's Duppy Conqueror, World Literature Today said:

"Ferdinand Dennis is faultless in his depiction of artifacts, customs, speech, and behavior in the three continents of Marshall's adventures; his descriptions of the externals and his analyses of the internal motivations of his characters–both minor and principal–are quite arresting, whether he is writing about 'the unintended arrogance of the shy person' or commenting on 'love that came without duty and expired without money, leaving a rancid odour of guilt.' Duppy Conqueror is neither a bildungsroman nor a political treatise, though it shares some of the elements of both subgenres; it is almost a fictional biography of a sixty-year-old thinking proletarian searching for racial and ideological roots. Some readers will read Dennis's novel as a roman a clef, others as a contemporary version of Claude McKay's Banana Bottom and Home to Harlem extended to Africa; but few will read it without admiration and considerable satisfaction."

Other favourable coverage came from The Times Higher Education: "This very ambitious novel is nothing less than a history of the twentieth century, seen though Afro-Caribbean spectacles... Framed as a postcolonial picaresque, it has a hurtling energy which raises it above Dennis's previous work. Finally, and most importantly, Duppy Conqueror brims with humour and low comedy. It is a pleasing change from the wilfully ponderous treatment of historical memory and diasporic identity in much contemporary postcolonial fiction." According to The Independent′s Rachel Halliburton: "Duppy Conqueror presents a giant's eye view of the exiled African psyche. An ambitious and compelling novel.... This is a novel packed to the brim with layers of symbolism, individual and cultural memories, and fascinating historical stories. Reading it once just won't be enough."

Calling Voices of the Crossing (2000) "a fine anthology of 14 memoirs by writers from Africa, the Caribbean, India and Pakistan" (E. A. Markham, Attia Hosain, Beryl Gilroy, John Figueroa, David Dabydeen, Mulk Raj Anand, Dom Moraes, Buchi Emecheta, Rukhsana Ahmad, G. V. Desani, Homi Bhabha, James Berry, Farrukh Dhondy and Nirad Chaudhuri), the New Statesman reviewer Robert Winder wrote: "...the memoirs in this book, while not the major works of any of the writers concerned, might be as significant as their more ambitious work.... They are more direct, eye-opening tributes to the spirited resolve that underpins all literature, not just 'colonial' literature."

On the publication of his 2021 book The Black and White Museum, Margaret Busby described Dennis as "[a] writer inspired by the idea and realities of Africa and the African diaspora, which he has explored in novels, short stories and travelogues, creating a unique body of work that deserves greater recognition", while Maya Jaggi's review in The Guardian said that the collection "confirms Ferdinand Dennis as a flâneur and urban philosopher exploring territory he first began to map in his now classic novels." Amidst other favourable critical attention, Gary Younge characterised Dennis as "an elegant writer, both in fiction and non-fiction, who deftly weaves the tales of the diaspora into his work", while Yvonne Brewster noted: "Dennis does not disappoint... Riveting sensitive snapshots of inner city London life."

Dennis's most recent novel, Concrete Dreams, published by Peepal Tree Press in October 2025, was described in the Camden New Journal as "compelling", and Voice Mag concluded: "Overall, Concrete Dreams is a richly textured, emotionally intelligent, and sharply observant novel."

== Bibliography ==
Novels

- 1989: The Sleepless Summer, Hodder & Stoughton. ISBN 978-0340502822
- 1996: The Last Blues Dance, HarperCollins. ISBN 978-0006497837
- 1998: Duppy Conqueror, Flamingo. ISBN 978-0006497844.
  - 2020: paperback reprint, Hope Road, ISBN 9781913109035, ebook ISBN 9781913109103
- 2021: The Black and White Museum (short stories), Hope Road, paperback ISBN 9781913109837
- 2025: Concrete Dreams, Peepal Tree Press, ISBN 9781845236021

Non-fiction

- 1988: Behind the Frontlines: Journey into Afro-Britain, Gollancz. ISBN 978-0575043275
- 1992: Back to Africa: A Journey, Sceptre. ISBN 978-0340579626

As editor

- 2000: Voices of the Crossing: The Impact of Britain on Writers from Asia, the Caribbean and Africa (co-edited with Naseem Khan), Serpent's Tail. ISBN 978-1852425838

== Awards and recognition ==
- 1988: Martin Luther King Memorial Prize for Behind the Frontlines: Journey into Afro-Britain
- 2022: Fellow of the Royal Society of Literature
