= Attia Hosain =

Indian-born British writer, broadcaster and actor (1913–1998)

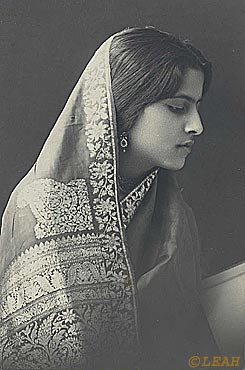
- Hosain in the 1930s
- Born: 20 October 1913; Lucknow, United Provinces, British India
- Died: 25 January 1998 (aged 84); London, United Kingdom
- Occupation: Writer
- Spouse: Ali Bahadur Habibullah (m. 1909; died 1982)
- Children: 2
- Relatives: Shaikh Shahid Husain (father); FS Hussain (brother)
- Writing career
- Genre: Novels

Attia Hosain (20 October 1913 – 25 January 1998) was an Indian-born British novelist, author, writer, broadcaster, journalist and actor. She was a woman of letters and a diasporic writer. She wrote in English although her mother tongue was Urdu. She wrote the semi-autobiographical novel Sunlight on a Broken Column (1961) and a collection of short stories titled Phoenix Fled. Her career began in England in semi-exile making a contribution to post-colonial literature. Anita Desai, Vikram Seth, Aamer Hussein and Kamila Shamsie have acknowledged her influence.

== Background and education ==
Born in Lucknow to a Muslim family of the Qidwai clan, Attia had five siblings, two sisters and three brothers. Their father, Shaikh Shahid Husain was a Cambridge-educated barrister-at-law and Taluqdar of the Ghadia district in the United Province and died shortly before her youngest sibling FS Hussain was born. Her mother, Begum Nisar Fatima, came from the Alvi family of Kakori. From her father, Attia inherited a keen interest in politics and nationalism. From her mother's family of poets and scholars she drew a knowledge of Urdu, Persian and Arabic. She was the first woman from her background to graduate from Lucknow University, after having attended La Martiniere School for Girls and Isabella Thoburn College, Lucknow.

Hosain grew up in two cultures, reading the canon of English and European literature as well as the Quran.

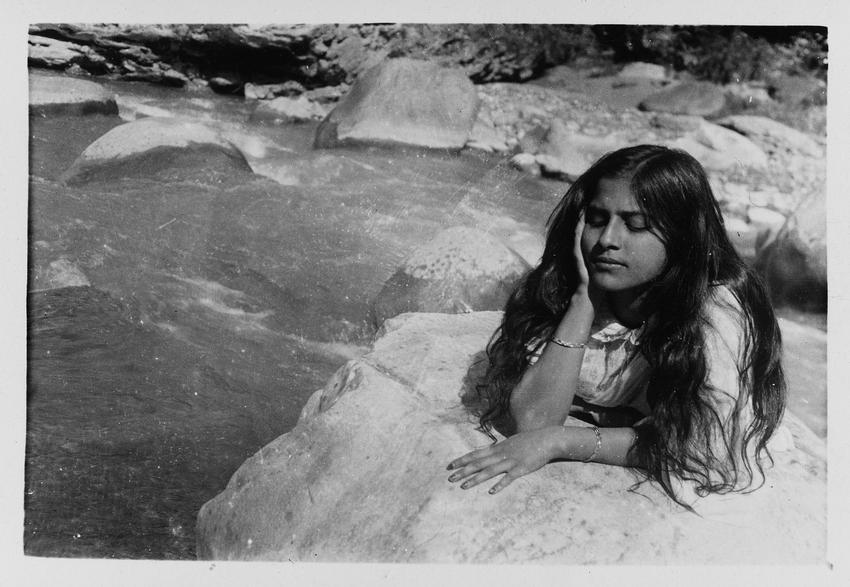
Attia Hosain aged 15

Attia came of age as the struggle for independence was gaining strength. Attia's father was a friend of Motilal Nehru at the Inns of Court. In 1933, Attia was encouraged by Sarojini Naidu, "my own ideal of womanhood from childhood", and attended the All India Women's Conference in Calcutta.

In her own words, Attia said, "I had been very influenced by the political thoughts of the Left in the Progressive Writers' Movement, through my friends Mulk Raj Anand, Sajjad Zaheer and Sahibzada Mahmuduzaffar and was asked by Desmond Young to write for The Pioneer." She also wrote for The Statesman, Calcutta.

She married her cousin, Ali Bahadur Habibullah, her mother's sister's son, against the wishes of their families. They had two children, Shama Habibullah and Waris Hussein. In the early 1940s the couple moved to Bombay, where Ali Bahadur was in government service, first in the Textile Commission and later as Supply Commissioner for South East Asia after the outbreak of World War II.

She turned her home into an extension of her childhood open house, a Lakhnavi "adda", a gathering that attracted an eclectic crowd of people, writers, filmmakers, members of social and business world of the city, which expanded to include her husband's more western world. A young Raj Thapar was brought in by her future husband Romesh Thapar to meet Attia, whom he called 'the only woman with a man's mind."

Ali Bahadur Habibullah moved to England with his family in 1947, before India became independent, posted to the Indian High Commission, in the newly created Trade Commission. When India was partitioned into India and Pakistan, the division of the country and the separation of two religious communities caused Attia great pain. "We belong to a generation that has lived with our hearts in pieces," she said.

Later in life she wrote: "Here I am, I have chosen to live in this country which has given me so much; but I cannot get out of my blood the fact that I had the blood of my ancestors for 800 years in another country."

== Writing ==
In London, where a diaspora of displaced people had gathered in a post-war world, Attia Hosain became a Qissa-go, the storyteller of her own roots. Her stories appeared in the English magazine Lilliput and the American Journal, the Atlantic Monthly.

The actress' performances were enriched by her experiences and her diverse cultural context.

In 1953, Phoenix Fled, her first collection of short stories, which are set just before the partition, was published. In 1961, Chatto and Windus published Sunlight on a broken Column.

For a long time this was thought to be her only published written work, until Distant Traveller, a collection, new & selected fiction was published in 2012, to honour her coming centenary year, which included excerpts of her unfinished novel, No New Lands, No New Seas, set in England. Many of her stories have now been included in other anthologies.

In 1998 Sunlight on a broken Column and Phoenix Fled were re-launched as Virago Modern Classics. Attia Hosian was reborn as a writer enjoying a considerable reputation.

To the young writers, she wrote: "You must keep trying because it is as essential as drawing breath – like exhaling! All the thoughts breathed out and shaping themselves visibly after being inside the cells of the brain, and then released. If you hold your breath and do not breathe out, you will suffocate."

Attia did not apologize for English as her chosen language of expression. "In the struggle for freedom, English was both a weapon, as well as the key to what I might call the ideological arsenal. The result of this clashing and merging of different cultures was that I, like many others, lived in many worlds of thoughts and many centuries at the same time, shifting from one to the other with bewildering rapidity in a matter of moments", Writing in a foreign tongue by Attia Hosain.

To the end of her life, she retained a fierce, iconoclastic political consciousness and was scornful of hypocrisy, extremism and sectarianism. She struggled for harmony between the languages, cultures and beliefs that surrounded her and drew strength from socialism, humanism and enlightened Islam, although she accepted no philosophy without rigorous analysis.

== Fiction ==
- Phoenix Fled, London: Chatto & Windus, 1953. A collection of short stories. Reissued by Virago UK, 1988. Indian edition, Rupa & Co, 1993 - Foreword by Anita Desai.
- Sunlight on a Broken Column - London: Chatto & Windus, UK, 1961, A novel; Reissued by Virago, UK, 1988; Reissued by Virago, UK, 2021, with introduction by Kamila Shamsie

Indian Editions: (1) Arnold Heinemann, India, 1979 - Foreword by Mulk Raj Anand; (2) Penguin India, 1992 - Foreword by Anita Desai

- Distant Traveller, new and selected fiction: edited by Aamer Hussein with Shama Habibullah, with foreword and afterword by them, and introduction by Ritu Menon (Women Unlimited, India 2013). This contains the first publication of a section of Hosain's unfinished novel, No New Lands, No New Seas.

== Excerpts etc ==
- Indian short stories. Edited by Iqbal Masud & Mulk Raj Anand. The New India Publishing Company, 1946. Attia Hosain: "The Parrot in the Cage".
- Cooking the Indian Way. Ed. Attia Hosain, Sita Pasricha, London: Paul Hamlyn, 1962.
- "Light on Divided Worlds", The Independent, 18 August 1988. By Attia Hosain celebrating the Virago edition of her books Sunlight on a Broken Column and Phoenix Fled, 1981.
- Loaves and Wishes – writers writing on Food. Edited by Antonia Hill. London: Virago Press, 1992.
- The Inner Courtyard. Edited by Lakshmi Holmstrom. Attia Hosain: "The First Party" (1), London: Virago Press, 1990 (2) India version – Rupa & Co., 1993
- Infinite Riches - short stories. Edited by Lynn Knight. London: Virago Modern Classics, London: Virago Press, 1993. Attia Hosain: P. 176, "Time is Unredeemable".
- Voices of the Crossing - The impact of Britain on writers from Asia, the Caribbean and Africa. Ferdinand Dennis, Naseem Khan (eds), London: Serpent's Tail, 1998. Attia Hosain: p. 19 "Deep Roots".
- Shaam-e-Awadh - Writings on Lucknow. Edited by VeenaTalwar. Oldenburg, 2007. Attia Hosain: Excerpt from Sunlight on a Broken Column (ref. pp. 165–178).
- Unbound – 2000 years of Indian Women's writing. Edited by Annie Zaidi. Aleph Book Co., 2015. Attia Hosain: Excerpt from Sunlight on a Broken Column (ref. p. 52 on marriage).

== Recordings and broadcasts ==
=== BBC Eastern Services (Urdu) ===
Shakespeare plays – translations. Played various parts, including Lady Macbeth, Desdemona, alongside Zia Moinuddin, Ijaz Hussain Batalvi, Amira Ahuja.

Also in Urdu – translations of plays by Jean Cocteau and Harold Pinter, among others, as lead actor.

=== In English ===
BBC Third Programme Writing in a Foreign Tongue, 7 May 1956.

Woman's Hour, "Passport to Friendship", 1965

Audio conversations (public and private) with Literary Estate of Attia Hosain.

== Theatre and film ==
- Film treatment for proposed film Mourning Raga by Ellis Peters (Edith Pargeter)
- The Bird of Time by Peter Mayne at the Savoy Theatre, London, 1961

== As journalist ==
- The Pioneer (Lucknow). Ed. Desmond Young
- The Statesman (Calcutta). Ed. Evan Charlton

== Organizations ==
- Attended foundation of Progressive Writer's Association [through Mahmudu Zaffar and Ali (Bunnay) Zaheer]
- Attended All-India Women's Conference Calcutta, 1933 [through Sarojini Naidu]

== Research ==
Hosain's Partition novel Sunlight on a Broken Column has been widely studied for its representation of gender, displacement, and social change. Ruvani Ranasinha's South Asian Writers in Twentieth-Century Britain: Culture in Translation (2007) examines Hosain's negotiation of cultural identity in postcolonial Britain. Fawzia Afzal-Khan has analyzed the novel's treatment of women, tradition, and modernity in South Asian Muslim contexts. Priyamvada Gopal has also discussed Hosain's work in relation to feminist and postcolonial literary traditions.

More recent doctoral research has examined Hosain's Partition fiction through the frameworks of feminist geography and memory studies, situating it alongside other Muslim women's Partition narratives that reconfigure spaces of home, city, and nation in times of trauma and transition.

== Video references ==
- Attia Hosain - A life. Urdu & English interview and comments by Mulk Raj Anand and Gopalkrishna Gandhi. Nehru Centre, London. 1998.
- Literature Help: Novels: Plot Overview 514: Sunlight on a Broken Column.
- Lecture on Attia Hosain by Dr. Anand Prakash, Professor (Retd) of English, University of Delhi.
