= Geiger (corporation) =

Advertising specialties company

- Type: Corporation
- Industry: Ad Specialties
- Founded: Newark, New Jersey
- Founder: Andrew and Jacob Geiger
- Headquarters: Lewiston, Maine, United States
- Number of locations: 16
- Area served: Worldwide
- Key people: Jo-an Lantz (CEO),
- Products: Promotional Products
- Services: Advertising
- Revenue: ▲US$ 210.6 million (2018)
- Owner: Geiger Family
- Number of employees: 500 employees, 550 independent sales partners
- Website: https://www.geiger.com

Geiger is an advertising specialties company with more than 500 employees and more than 550 sales representatives. It is the industry's largest family-owned and family-managed distributorship and is based in Lewiston, Maine.

Initially named Geiger Brothers, it was founded in Newark, New Jersey, in 1878 and spans 5 generations.

== History ==
The company was founded when brothers Andrew and Jacob Geiger took over their father’s two-room print shop in Newark, New Jersey. A staff of 4 -- the brothers, a printer, and a bookkeeper—produced a small line that included advertising calendars, fans, and greeting cards. The second generation brothers, Frank, Charles, and George entered the company in the early 20th century. They added date books and diaries to their expanding line.

Frank’s two sons, Ray and Frank, joined the business in the 1930s. Frank led the firm into the distribution of advertising specialty products made by other companies. Ray acquired the renowned Farmers’ Almanac becoming its 6th editor for the next 60 years.

The company moved to Lewiston, Maine in 1955. Their facility has been expanded four times and underwent an extensive renovation in 2017-2018. During the renovation process, they added a large solar array of 696 panels to generate 100% of the power needed by the renovated facility. In 2019, Geiger's Maine headquarters was awarded LEED gold certification by the US Green Building Council (USGBC).

Ray’s son Gene is chairman and grandson David is President and Ray's son Peter Geiger succeeded him as editor of the Farmers’ Almanac and is now the vice chairman. Non-family executive Jo-an Lantz has been CEO since 2019.

On March 6, 2013, Geiger agreed to divest its manufactured products division to Canada based Blueline.

== Farmers' Almanac ==
The Farmers' Almanac is a compendium of knowledge on weather, gardening, cooking, remedies, managing your household, preserving the earth, and more. Published every year since 1818, it was founded by David Young, Philom. In 1949, Ray and Ann Geiger obtained the rights to Almanac Publishing Company/Farmers’ Almanac. Geiger Bros. produced and distributed the Farmers’ Almanac ever since.

Peter Geiger succeeded Ray Geiger as editor in 1994 and used the same designation Philom. ("Philomath", or "lover of knowledge") and passed it on to final editor Sondra "Sandi" Duncan.
