= Sunlight on a Broken Column =

1961 book by Attia Hosain

First edition (publ. Chatto & Windus)

Sunlight on a Broken Column is a novel by Attia Hosain, which was published in 1961. The novel, mainly set in Lucknow, is an autobiographical account by a fictional character called Laila, who is a 15-year-old orphaned daughter of a rich Muslim family of Taluqdars. It is a novel by a Muslim lady on the theme of Partition of India into India and Pakistan.

In 2022, the novel was included on the "Big Jubilee Read" list of 70 books by Commonwealth authors, selected to celebrate the Platinum Jubilee of Elizabeth II.

== Title ==
The title comes from a line in the second stanza of T.S Eliot's (1925) poem The Hollow Men:

Eyes I dare not meet in dreams
In death's dream kingdom
These do not appear:
There, the eyes are
Sunlight on a broken column

== Plot summary ==
Laila, a young girl who has lost both her parents, lives in the household of her grandfather, along with her father’s sisters Abida and Majida and, Majida's 17-year-old daughter Zahra. She is brought up by her orthodox but principled Aunt Abida. Though Laila, according to the wishes of her father, had the benefit of western education, she too keeps purdah like her aunts. However, death of her grandfather makes Uncle Hamid, her father’s elder brother, head of the family and her new guardian. Uncle Hamid, a man of "liberal’ ideas, is nevertheless an autocratic guardian, allowing very little freedom to those who live under his rule.

No longer in Purdah, Laila starts attending college. Her university friends, as well as her distant cousin Asad, become involved in anti-government protests. Surrounded by people who are either pro-British or against, she, however, is unable to take sides. She is enmeshed in the struggle for her own personal freedom. Once when asked by her uncle to opine about the agitation going on in the university, she refuses to do so. On being asked whether she had no freedom of thought she answers that she has no freedom of action. Her rebellion against the hypocrisy visible in the so-called liberal views of her Uncle and his wife remains limited to her mind until she falls in love with Ameer. Ameer, a poor relative of their family friends, would never be approved by her family. She goes against their wishes to marry him, and wins her freedom from their authority. The novel ends with her loneliness after Ameer's death after the bloody partition and so-called independence of both the nations, India and Pakistan. Her slow turn towards nationalist politics of India, the confused state of the "secular" Muslim in post-independence India is symbolized by her subtle acceptance of Asad, her cousin. The novel is open-ended and we never know what she finally decides, though.
