= Mukul Kesavan =

Indian writer

Mukul Kesavan (born 9 April 1957) is an Indian historian, novelist and political and social essayist. He was schooled at St. Xaviers' School in Delhi and then went on to study history at St. Stephen's College, and at the University of Delhi. He later attended Trinity Hall, University of Cambridge on an Inlaks scholarship, where he received an MLitt degree.

== Works ==
His first book, a novel titled Looking Through Glass (Farrar Straus & Giroux, 1994), received international critical acclaim. In 2001, he wrote a political tract titled Secular Common Sense, which was published by Penguin India. He teaches social history at Jamia Millia Islamia in Delhi.

Kesavan writes frequently about the game of cricket. His book on cricket, Men in White, was published by Penguin India in 2007. He also wrote a blog by the same name on ESPNcricinfo.

Kesavan is also the author of The Ugliness of the Indian Male and Other Propositions, published by Black Kite in 2008. The book is a collection of essays on a wide variety of themes, ranging from Indian films to Indian men, travel writing, and political commentary. His latest book, titled Homeless on Google Earth (2013), published by Permanent Black, is a collection of several previous columns and opinion essays alongside some previously unpublished essays.

Kesavan is the co-editor of Civil Lines, a widely respected journal of Indian writing in English. In 2014, The New Republic included his Homeless on Google Earth in its list of the year's best books, describing Kesavan as "[a] novelist and essayist, a historian and poet, a social commentator and public intellectual, [who] commands an enviable following in the Anglophone world beyond America and Britain".

His columns have appeared in The Telegraph, ESPNcricinfo, Outlook Magazine, Mint, and several other periodicals and journals.

His mother, Dr Chandrakanta Narain, was Punjabi, born in Lahore and brought up in Delhi. His father B. S. Kesavan, a writer, was also the curator of the National Library in Calcutta.

He lives in New Delhi with his wife, the UNDP lawyer Arundhati Das, and their two children.

== See also ==
- List of Indian writers
