= Shaikh Shahid Husain =

Indian barrister (1878-1924)

Lieutenant Shaikh Shahid Husain OBE
- شیخ شاہد حسین
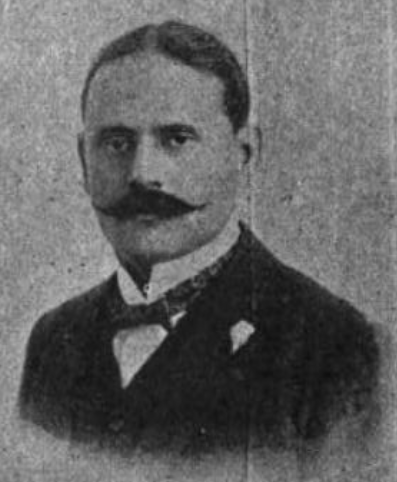
- Husain in 1914

Personal details
- Born: 8 January 1878 Barabanki district, North-Western Provinces
- Died: died on or before September 1924 (aged 46)
- Children: 6, including Attia and FS Hussain
- Education: Canning College, Lucknow; Allahbad University; Pembroke College, Oxford (one term)
- Alma mater: Christ's College, Cambridge (B.A., LLB with Honours)

Military service
- Branch/service: British Indian Army
- Years of service: 1918-1924
- Rank: Honorary Lieutenant

Shaikh Shahid Husain (Note: Urdu: شیخ شاہد حسین; Also spelled as Shaikh Shahid Husain, Sheikh Shahid Hosain, Sheikh Shahid Hussain, Sheikh Shahid Husain, Sheikh Shahid Hussein, and Shahid Hosain Kidwai.) (8 January 1878 — died on or before September 1924) was an Indian barrister who was a Taluqdar of Gadia, an estate which paid Rs. 11,865 in land revenue, and served as the Municipal Commissioner of Lucknow. He was also a member of the All-India Muslim League.

== Early life ==
Shaikh Shahid Husain was born on 8 January 1878 to Waris Husain. The family belonged to the Qidwai tribe which migrated from Rum in the 14th century and colonised 52 villages in Lucknow district and Barabanki district. He came from one of the oldest Muslim families of Oudh.

After completing his Intermediate Examination at Canning College, Lucknow, Shaikh also studied at the Allahbad University. He resided for one term at Pembroke College, Oxford in 1900, before proceeding to Christ's College, Cambridge, earning a Bachelor of Arts and LL.B. with honours in 1903. He was called to the Bar the same year. After returning to India, he established a legal practice.

== Personal life ==
Husain married Nisar Fatima. They had six children, three daughters including Attia and three sons. Their youngest child was Air Commodore FS Hussain. Another son, Sheikh Reshad Husain (born 1911) was also a barrister and served as the High Commissioner of India to Ceylon in 1947.

Shaikh Shahid Husain was the uncle of Muneeza Shamsie's father, Isha'at Habibullah, the first Pakistani to head a major multi-national corporation in Pakistan in 1961.

Shaikh Shahid Husain was a Taluqdar of Gadia in the Barabanki District, an estate which paid Rs. 11,865 in land revenue. He was closely related to Munshir Husain Kidwai, a founder of the Anjuman-i-Khuddam-i-Kaaba, a society formed to protect the Holy places of Islam from "non-Muslim aggression".

== Later life ==
Shaikh Shahid Husain was a prominent figure in British India and a close associate of Motilal Nehru. He was also the chief representative of the Qidwai clan.

In December 1904, he was involved in organising the Muslim Educational Conference in Lucknow, and received a gold medal for his zeal and work in the Conference. By 1908, he was elected Honorary Joint Secretary of the British Indian Association, a position he held for years. In March 1908, Husain was elected as a member of the All-India Muslim League. In 1909, he led an agitation for a separate electorate for Muslims.

He represented the Muslims of Oudh in the Local Legislative Council and was a member of various boards, including the Municipal Board of Lucknow, the Boards of Management of Canning College, Colvin Talukdars' School, and Medical College, as well as the Advisory Committee of the United Provinces. Additionally, he served as Director of the Upper India National Bank Limited, and the Baib & Wood Pulp Manufacturing Company, Limited, Lucknow.

Husain received an honorary commission into the British Indian Army on 8 October 1918. He was among several individuals granted the honorary rank of Second Lieutenant by King George V in 1919. The same year, he was promoted to Lieutenant and was the 4,050th individual to be awarded Officer of the Order of the British Empire..

In 1924, the government assessed him as: "difficult to ascertain his real views. Is well educated and a fluent speaker and is possibly a conservative at heart. Is ambitious and if given office would come down definitely on the side of Government."

Though British historian Francis Robinson claims that Husain was a Sunni, Husain wrote a book on Shia theology titled Luma (light), which had a commentary written on it by Sheikh Zainuddin in 1925.

== Death ==
He died in or before September 1924.
