= Insurgent Empire: Anticolonial Resistance and British Dissent =

2019 book by Priyamvada Gopal

- Author: Priyamvada Gopal
- Language: English
- Subjects: colonialism, violence, post-colonialism
- Publisher: Verso Books
- Publication date: 2019
- Publication place: United Kingdom
- Media type: Print
- Pages: 624
- ISBN: 9781784784126

Insurgent Empire: Anticolonial Resistance and British Dissent is a 2019 book by Priyamvada Gopal, characterised by Dinyar Patel as "a sweeping account of anti-colonial thought in the very heart of the British Empire".

Drawing eclectically on literary as well as traditional historical sources, the book covers the century or so from the Indian Rebellion of 1857 to the Mau Mau Uprising of 1953 (though also touching on later political movements such as Rhodes Must Fall). It focuses on key intellectuals and how their role in public debate mediated ideas generated in the colonies to left-wing activists in Britain, a process that Gopal refers to as "reverse tutelage", demonstrating that criticisms of the British Empire were being voiced both at its centre and its periphery during the colonial period.

== Summary ==
=== Overview ===
In the words of Nuno Domingos and Ricardo Roque, the book argues that

rebellions in the British colonies [...] contributed effectively to the political and intellectual making of freedom, equality, and ultimately to decolonization and the end of British imperial rule in the twentieth-century. Through the mediation of critical discourses voiced in the public sphere, local revolts against oppressive colonial regimes could change European self-serving constructs of imperialism; they could act subversively upon the fabrication of empire itself. Across the British Empire [...] insurgencies were fundamental for the development of liberal modernity and global democracy.

The book is divided into two sections, entitled "Crisis and Connections" and "Agitation and Alliances".

=== Section 1: Crisis and Connections ===
This section argues that colonialist, British history-writing has under-appreciated the degree to which colonies of the British Empire achieved independence through the struggles of the colonised people rather than from top-down imperial policy-making. In particular, it argues that resistance to colonisation within the colonies was profoundly influential on the anti-colonial thought of British intellectuals and activists.

==== Chapter 1: The Spirit of the Sepoy Host ====
This chapter focuses on the Indian Rebellion of 1857 and its reception by such British intellectuals as John Brutus Norton, Richard Congreve, Wilfrid Scawen Blunt and Ernest Jones (who have, Gopal argues, received less attention from historians than they deserve). It considers the ways in which these intellectuals came to read the rebellion as evidence for colonial injustice.

==== Chapter 2: A Barbaric Independence ====
This chapter focuses on the 1865 Morant Bay Rebellion in Jamaica, in particular the execution of the Jamaican critic of Empire George William Gordon (c. 1820–65) by Governor Edward John Eyre. It examines the ways in which formerly enslaved Black rebels challenged colonial conceptions of “freedom”, and the ways in which British intellectuals prioritised class solidarity with Black rebels over racist divisions, arguing that British workers would be subjected to as fierce abuses as Jamaican ones unless they resisted oppression.

==== Chapter 3: The Accidental Anticolonialist ====
This chapter analyses how the English aristocrat Wilfrid Blunt (1840–1922) came to support Egyptian nationalism through his encounter with the 1882 Urabi revolt in Egypt and with Muslim intellectuals there, particularly Jamal-ud-din al-Afghani.

==== Chapter 4: Passages to Internationalism ====
Gopal continues her analysis of Blunt's activism, now focusing on India and the way in which Blunt's reading and writing shaped his understanding of British colonialism.

=== Section 2: Agitation and Alliances ===
This section argues that ideas flowed not only from the metropole to the rest of the Empire, as traditional, Eurocentric history-writing has assumed, but also in the other direction, and that thought developed in the Empire encouraged anti-imperial sentiment in the metropole. British thinkers whom Gopal takes as examples of this process include Sylvia Pankhurst, Nancy Cunard, and George Padmore. Gopal particularly traces how networks between individuals facilitated the transmission and development of ideas in the metropole.

==== Chapter 5: The Interpreter of Insurgencies ====
This chapter focuses on Shapurji Saklatvala (1874–1936), a Parsi communist and the first person of Indian heritage to become a British Member of Parliament (MP) for the UK Labour Party. To his British audiences, Saklatvala promoted "democracy and self-determination for India" and argued that British workers would face the same oppression as Indian ones if they did not resist capitalist elites. To his Indian audiences, Saklatvala argued that the blame for colonial oppression lay with only a minority of British people and the Indian elites too needed to cede power to oppressed Indians.

==== Chapter 6: The Revolt of the Oppressed World ====
This chapter focuses on the work of the international League Against Imperialism, and specifically its support for trade unionists imprisoned in British India in the Meerut conspiracy case (1929–33), arguing that the repressive use of colonial law encouraged left-wingers' cross-border and cross-racial class solidarity.

==== Chapter 7: Black Voices Matter ====
This chapter focuses on the anthology Negro edited by the British aristocrat Nancy Cunard, characterised by Gopal as a "unique combination of harrowing accounts of oppression and exhilarating portrait of black music, art and literature", and the Daily Worker editor Sylvia Pankhurst, emphasising these women's collaborations with Black intellectuals, particularly Claude McKay.

==== Chapter 8: Internationalizing African Opinion ====
This chapter focuses on how, in the 1930s, African and Caribbean events (including the Italian invasion of Abyssinia) raised the international profile of African and Caribbean resistance to colonisation.

==== Chapter 9: Smash Our Own Imperialism ====
This chapter focuses on the American journalist George Padmore who, in Gazal Khan and Sarbani Banerjee's summary of Gopal's analysis, "worked to make the struggle of the working class and the intertwined relationship of capitalism and imperialism more conspicuous than ever".

==== Chapter 10: A Terrible Assertion of Discontent ====
This chapter analyses independence struggles and decolonisation in Africa, focusing on the Mau Mau Uprising in 1950s Kenya and the imperial authorities' violent response to it, along with similar anti-colonial struggles and counterinsurgency in Malaya. Gopal shows how an enquiry into the Uprising, and the work of the Kenyan labour organizer Tom Mboya, led Fenner Brockway and Margery Perham publicly to promote decolonisation.

== Reception ==
=== Originality ===
In the view of Chandak Sengoopta, "Priyamvada Gopal, a literary scholar, has given us a deeply researched and politically sensitive study of anticolonial resistance across the British Empire that more than makes up for historians' neglect [...] Gopal's meticulously researched study is a major contribution to the historiography of the British Empire, as notable for its research as it is for its lucid, forceful prose".

The book was seen as distinctive for avoiding what Miles Taylor called "the conventional critics of empire, such as JA Hobson or George Orwell" in order to uncover a history of more radically anti-imperialist British intellectuals, such as Edward Beesly, Arthur Ballard, Catherine Donnellan and Eleanor Francis Cahill, whose existence shows that critiques of the British Empire contemporary with Gopal are not anachronistic, but repeat humanistic insights articulated across a century of the Empire's history.

Gil Shohat characterised the work as

eine insgesamt gelungene Arbeit [...], in der sie die lange Zeit vernachlässigten Schriften britischer Empire-kritischer Dissidenten in Beziehung zu den sie beeinflussenden Schriften und Akteuren aus den damaligen Kolonien setzt. Das ist deshalb innovativ, weil radikale britische Empire-Kritik bisher überwiegend isoliert von den sie beeinflussenden Stimmen aus den Weiten des Empire betrachtet wurden, während die zahlreichen postkolonialen Forschungen zur Handlungsmacht der Subalternen ebenfalls die wechselseitige Vermittlung von Ideen und Ansichten zwischen Metropole und Kolonie eher kursorisch behandelt haben.

[a generally successful work [...], in which she relates the long-neglected writings of British dissidents critical of the Empire to the writings and actors from what were then colonies who influenced them. This is innovative because radical British criticism of the Empire has so far been viewed largely in isolation from the voices that influenced it from the peripheries of the Empire, while the numerous post-colonial studies on the agency of the subaltern have also dealt with the mutual mediation of ideas and views between metropolis and colony rather cursorily.]

This view was echoed by Antoinette Burton in The American Historical Review. Harald Fischer-Tiné suggested that "at first sight" none of the book's key points

appears to be earthshakingly original. There has been no dearth of recent attempts to provide portrayals of the British imperialism as a story of 'resistance, repression and revolt', and there is by now also a growing body on literature about diasporic anticolonialists and their 'politics of friendship' with Western radicals. The unique character of Gopal's book lies rather in its ambition to bring these threads together and provide a truly 'grand synthetic counter-narrative' of protest and resistance that covers an entire century (1850s to 1950s).

=== Methodology ===
Writing in Dialogues in Human Geography, Sarah de Leeuw emphasised the book's methodological value, presenting its eclectic approach to sources, close textual analysis, and deployment of literary theory as a model for geographers seeking to write in an anticolonial mode, and other reviewers too saw its literary approaches as representing a useful model for non-literary disciplines. Correspondingly, reviewers suggested that Gopal's study would be worth replicating for other imperial regimes and periods of British imperialism. Conversely, while arguing that "as a discourse analysis that focuses on the expression of particular anticolonial sentiments, Insurgent Empire is wildly successful", Zak Leonard suggested that Gopal's "'enthusiastically generalist' methodology can result in a somewhat uneven scholarly product. Some chapters [...] are hampered by a lack of historical context or limited engagement with recent historiography", though Elliot Ross held that "there are very few works by contemporary scholars that can stand beside Gopal's book in terms of depth and quality of scholarship across so wide a range of contexts and traditions".

=== Scope ===
Gazal Khan and Sarbani Banerjee characterised the work as a "promising monograph" that "actively and abundantly contributes to postcolonial scholarship, and especially to studies of Empire, subaltern historiography, myth-making, and resistance studies", though they and others noted that it overlooked important events such as the Munda rebellion, Boer War, Irish rebellion, and Wad habuba revolt. Similarly, Nuno Domingos and Ricardo Roque argued that Insurgent Empire "empirically debunk[s] the vacuous idea that criticizing empire and providing dissident historical accounts of imperialism is 'anachronistic', as some conservative nationalist historians claim today [...] This book is also an important demonstration that 'imperialism', even at home, was never a consensual national undertaking". At the same time, however, they emphasised that Gopal's emphasis on "broad-scale violent revolts and uprisings" and the metropolitan mediators of anti-colonial ideas should not be allowed to detract from acts of resistance in the colonies, including subtle and unrecorded forms of "everyday resistance". Similar criticisms were articulated by Gil Shohat and Josephine Faith Ong.

=== Plausibility ===
Miles Taylor doubted how influential the radical thinkers identified by Gopal really were among the British Left, a concern contemplated by other reviewers too. Correspondingly, Zaib un Nisa Aziz argued that Insurgent Empire tacitly presents

two different traditions which are in tension with one another – a tradition of the critique of imperial governance and a challenge to the basic legitimacy of an imperial polity. There is often conceptual slippage between these two types of criticisms which at times obfuscates the larger project of the book. [...] Critiques of imperial governance and policies, even virulent ones, were not always tantamount to a challenge to the fundamental legitimacy of the imperial enterprise.

Likewise, Fischer-Tiné found that "one can discern a slight tendency to paint too rosy a picture of cross-racial anti-imperial alliances between anti-colonial agitators and British leftist politicians and intellectuals". Dina M. Siddiqi, however, viewed Gopal's case as "provocative – and generally persuasive".

=== Political relevance ===
A number of reviewers emphasised the book's importance as an intervention in the British left-wing politics of its own time, responding to the imperialist nostalgia of Britain's populist right wing. Some read it specifically as "tracing a genealogy of dissent" to call scholars and activists to emulate the radical figures described by the book. For example, Nadine El-Enany emphasised its personal importance to her as a second-generation migrant in Britain; Høgsbjerg opined that "Gopal’s work is an inspiring and powerful call to arms for a new generation of scholar-activists to commit themselves to this 'decolonial' struggle"; and Siddiqi characterised it as "a book of hope, to think through and with in our dark times". Conversely, Fischer-Tiné suggested that "at times, the tone may be a bit polemic, and the fact that Gopal has an axe to grind by attacking Ferguson and other conservative 'Empire mythologists' becomes plainly obvious. However, [...] in a time when right-wing academics like Bruce Gilley continue to get a lot of media attention when making their revisionist 'case for colonialism', it is essential to send out clear messages."

=== Awards ===
The book was shortlisted for the 2020 Bread and Roses Award the Books Are My Bag Readers' Award, and the 2020 Nayef Al-Rodhan Prize for Global Cultural Understanding.

== Controversy ==
The London Review of Books commissioned a review of Insurgent Empire by Adom Getachew, but then declined to publish it, prompting fierce criticism on social media on the grounds that the London Review of Books was marginalising work by women and ethnic minority writers (in this case both Gopal and Getachew). The review was later published.
