= Naseem Khan (activist) =

British journalist and activist (1939–2017)

Naseem Khan OBE
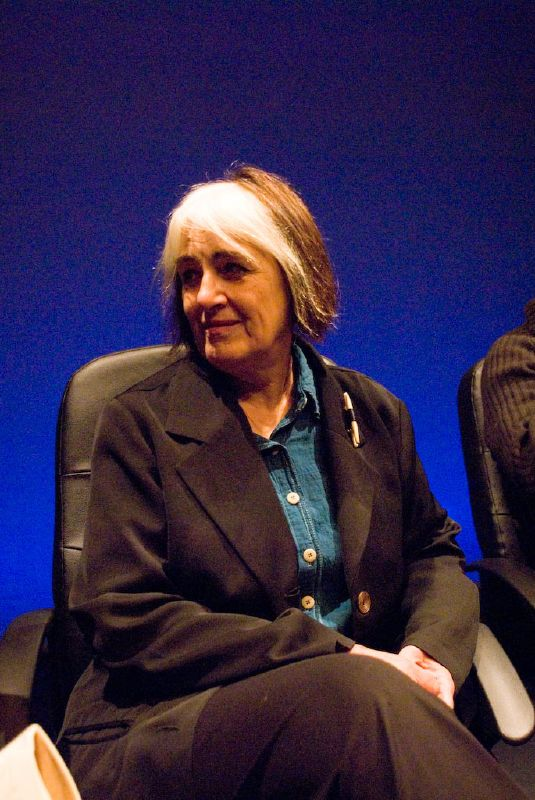
- Khan at the Dublin Writers Festival in 2007
- Born: Naseem Fatima Khan; 11 August 1939; Birmingham, England, U.K.
- Died: 8 June 2017 (aged 77)
- Education: Lady Margaret Hall, Oxford
- Occupations: journalist cultural activist
- Spouse(s): John Torode, m. 1974, separated 2000
- Children: 2

Naseem Fatima Khan OBE (11 August 1939 – 8 June 2017) was a British journalist, activist, cultural historian and educator who was influential in effecting policy change about cultural diversity.

She wrote a report entitled The Arts Britain Ignores in 1976, which was the first major study highlighting the integral part played in UK culture by black and Asian artists, and also that year she founded the Minority Arts Advisory Service (MAAS). As a journalist, she was one of the first theatre reviewers for Time Out magazine, and later wrote regularly for publications including the New Statesman, The Guardian and The Independent.

== Background and career ==
Naseem Khan was born in Birmingham, England, to Abdul Wasi Khan, a doctor from India, and Gerda (née Kilbinger), the daughter of a German trade unionist. After attending Roedean School, Khan studied for an English degree at Lady Margaret Hall, Oxford. She went on to work as a journalist, editing Notting Hill's black magazine The Hustler, with such contemporaries as Darcus Howe, becoming theatre editor at Time Out (1978–81), and subsequently working at City Limits. She also wrote for the New Statesman, where she had a column, and for The Guardian, The Independent and Good Housekeeping.

Her report The Arts Britain Ignores, published in 1976 (jointly supported by the Community Relations Commission, Arts Council of Great Britain and Calouste Gulbenkian Foundation), focused on the cultural contributions made by ethnic minority communities while raising questions about the institutional support such work was given. Her founding that year of the Minority Arts Advisory Service (MAAS) was followed by a body of work in diversity policy for organisations including the Council of Europe, UNESCO, Museums and Galleries Commission, Gulbenkian Foundation, Asia-Europe Foundation and the Arts Councils of England, Scotland and Wales.

She was appointed an OBE in the 1999 Birthday Honours for services to cultural diversity.

In 2000, Khan co-edited with Ferdinand Dennis the anthology Voices of the Crossing: The Impact of Britain on Writers from Asia, the Caribbean and Africa.

== Personal life ==
Khan married journalist John Torode in 1974 and they had two children, Amelia and George, before separating amicably in 2000.

== Bibliography ==
- Khan, Naseem (2017). Everywhere is Somewhere. Hebden Bridge, UK: Bluemoose Books. ISBN 9781910422397.
- Dennis, Ferdinand; Khan, Naseem, eds. (2000). Voices of the Crossing. London: Serpent's Tail. ISBN 9781852425838.
