= Priyamvada Gopal =

Professor at the University of Cambridge (born 1968)

Priyamvada Gopal FRSL
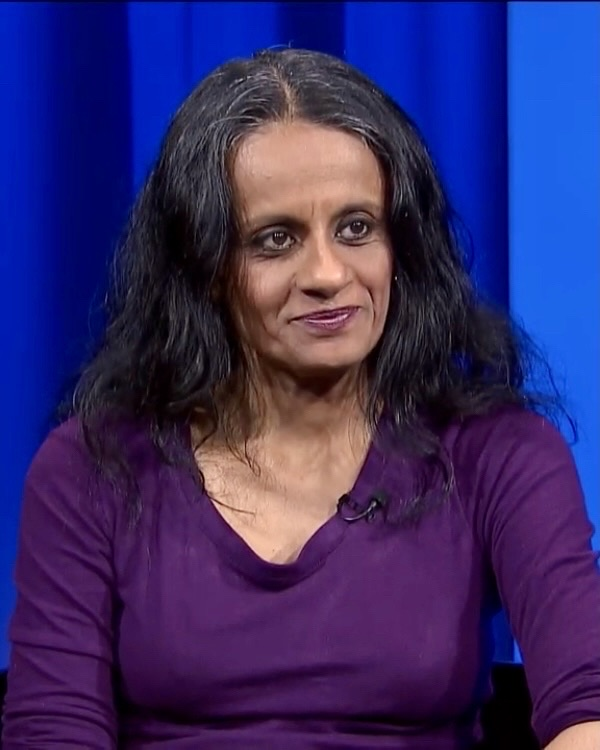
- Gopal in 2019
- Born: 27 August 1968 (age 58); Delhi, India
- Title: Professor of Postcolonial Studies

Academic background
- Education: University of Delhi; Jawaharlal Nehru University; Purdue University; Cornell University
- Thesis: Midnight's labors: Gender, nation and narratives of social transformation in transitional India, 1932–1954 (2000)
- Doctoral advisor: Biodun Jeyifo

Academic work
- Institutions: University of Cambridge; Churchill College

Priyamvada Gopal (born August 27, 1968) is an Indian-born academic, writer and activist who is professor of postcolonial studies at the University of Cambridge. Her primary teaching and research interests are in colonial and postcolonial studies, South Asian literature, critical race studies, and the politics and cultures of empire and globalisation. She has written three books engaging these subjects: Literary Radicalism in India (2005), The Indian English Novel (2009) and Insurgent Empire (2019).

Gopal's work has appeared in several newspapers and online publications, and she has contributed occasionally to radio and television programmes in Britain and elsewhere. Her remarks about race and empire have gained media attention and both praise and condemnation.

== Biography ==
=== Early life ===
Gopal was born in Delhi, India. The daughter of an Indian diplomat, she spent her childhood in India, Sri Lanka and Bhutan, and attended an international high school in Vienna, Austria, where her father served as a diplomat in the mid-1980s. She is from a Brahmin family; she is a critic of the caste system.

=== Education and career ===
Gopal received a BA in English from the University of Delhi in 1989 and an MA in Linguistics from Jawaharlal Nehru University in 1991. After finishing her studies in India, she moved to the United States to pursue graduate studies in English. She received an MA in English from Purdue University in 1993. She continued her postgraduate work at Cornell University, earning an MA in English in 1996 and a PhD in colonial and postcolonial literature in 2000.

She began her teaching career as a graduate instructor in the Department of English at Cornell University in 1995. She joined Connecticut College in 1999 as an Assistant Professor of English leaving in 2000. She moved to the University of Cambridge in 2001, where she is professor of Postcolonial Studies in the Faculty of English and a teaching fellow at Churchill College. She supervises and teaches in the areas of literary criticism, modern tragedy, 19th-century and modern British literature, and postcolonial and related literatures. Her primary interests are in colonial and postcolonial literatures, with related interests in British and American literatures, the novel, translation, gender and feminism, Marxism and critical theory, and the politics and cultures of empire and globalisation. From 2006 to 2010, she was Dean of Churchill College.

=== Accolades ===
In 2021, she was named one of the world's top 50 thinkers by Prospect magazine. She was elected a Fellow of the Royal Society of Literature (FRSL) in 2024.

== Thought ==
=== Empire ===
Gopal has written extensively about the impact of empire on contemporary culture in Britain and examined its broader social and cultural effects in South Asia and other former colonial societies. According to Gopal, her motivation to speak about issues of empire and colonialism started with a disagreement with historian Niall Ferguson about the British Empire, on a 2006 edition of BBC Radio 4's Start the Week.

In her 2019 book Insurgent Empire, Gopal examines traditions of dissent on the question of empire and shows how rebellions and resistance in the colonies influenced British critics of empire in a process she calls "reverse tutelage". She argues that ideas of freedom, justice, and common humanity had themselves taken shape in the struggle against imperialism.

Gopal has also written about the historical amnesia surrounding empire and called for a more honest account of how Britain came to be what it is today. She argues that developing a demanding relationship to history is essential to understanding the formative and shaping nature of the imperial project on British life.

==== Churchill, empire and race ====
In October 2020, Churchill College set up a working group to critically examine Winston Churchill's views and actions relating to empire and race. The working group held two events: "Churchill, Empire and Race: Opening the Conversation" and "The Racial Consequences of Mr Churchill". The latter event took place on 11 February 2021, chaired by Gopal. It was subsequently criticised in the press after a speaker said that the British Empire was worse than the Nazis, and that Churchill was the "perfect embodiment of white supremacy".

In June 2021, college Master Athene Donald ended the working group's role after a dispute between the College Council and the working party. In her statement, Donald stated that Gopal was frustrated over the Council's rejection of the Working Group's proposals for the third event. According to Donald, "the working group seems to have changed direction, with the second event not aligning with the initial proposals that council [the college’s trustee body] saw; nor did their suggestions for the third." She said that Gopal consequently wrote that the group might as well dissolve themselves. Donald said that rightly or wrongly, she took that statement at face value and abruptly ended the role of the group.

Gopal rejected the rationale given for the group's dissolution and said that the college had instead disbanded the group. She said that the disbanding was a way for the college to preempt the resignation of several members of the working group over the college pandering to the tabloid press and other groups. In her Twitter feed, Gopal accused the Daily Mail, Policy Exchange and the Churchill family of pressuring the college to discontinue the event, accusing university leaders of "taking fright" after the backlash.

In July 2021, a group of members of the working group released a statement denying that they had disbanded themselves and accused the college of not following due process in ending its role. The group also accused the College Council of undermining academic freedom and bringing the college into disrepute.

=== Race and Decolonising the Curriculum ===
Gopal has been a long-standing advocate for 'decolonisation' of Cambridge’s English curriculum. In June 2017, a group of Cambridge students asked the university to include more black and ethnic minority writers in its English literature curriculum, an initiative strongly supported by Gopal. She argues that decolonisation in the curriculum context is "about" having access to information and narratives, which reframe our understanding of the multiple lineages and sources of knowledge.

In the context of racial discrimination in the United Kingdom, Gopal has discussed white fragility, suggesting that a "way of deflecting engagement with race is to personalise matters"; a 2018 twitterstorm arising from Gopal arguing that a tweet by her Cambridge colleague Mary Beard represented white fragility has been taken as a case study by academic work on social media discourses about race. In October 2019, Gopal criticised the Equality and Human Rights Commission report "Tackling racial harassment: Universities challenged" for its language and not addressing the systemic disadvantages faced by black and minority ethnic students or the ways whiteness dominates power structures and pedagogy.

==== King's College racial profiling dispute ====
In June 2018, Gopal alleged racial profiling by college porters at the gate of King's College, Cambridge. Gopal said that she was subjected to racial profiling and aggression by the porters and gatekeepers of King's and that porters frequently hassled non-white staff and students at the gates. Gopal told a journalist from The Sunday Times it "was behaviour I very much doubt a white man of middle age who identified himself as a lecturer" would have faced. Gopal announced that she would no longer teach at King's until there was a resolution to the problem.

As a result of the attention the issue received, Cambridge University students came forward describing similar experiences. Students of English at King's also issued an open letter in support of Gopal, urging the college to offer her a "proper apology", and two other supervisors from the English department said they would refuse to teach at King's. King's denied that Gopal had been subject to racial profiling, and said that the CCTV footage of the incident revealed no wrongdoing by staff. Gopal said that she received hate mail following her announcement.

In October 2018, King's issued a statement announcing that it would put in place a "clearer and simpler means of reporting incidents" and that it would review its procedures for handling complaints. Gopal said senior college members also conveyed their private apologies and assured her that the college was taking the problem seriously. Shortly afterwards, Gopal rescinded her decision to withdraw her labour from the college.

==== 2020 ‘White lives’ tweet ====
In June 2020, Gopal tweeted, “White lives don't matter. As white lives” and “Abolish whiteness”, in response to a banner reading “White Lives Matter Burnley” that had been flown over a Premier League football match.

Gopal said that her comments were directed at the concept of “whiteness”, which she described as a societal structure associated with the presumed superiority of white people, rather than at white people themselves. She said that by writing that white lives did not matter “as white lives”, she meant that the value of a person's life should not be derived from racial identity.

The tweets prompted criticism and a campaign calling for Gopal to be removed from her position at the University of Cambridge. Gopal reported receiving abusive messages and death threats. The university defended the right of its academics to express lawful opinions and condemned personal attacks and abuse.

==== Daily Mail false allegations against Gopal ====
In November 2020, the Daily Mail issued an apology and paid £25,000 in damages to Gopal, after an opinion piece by Amanda Platell published in June 2020 falsely alleged that Gopal was "attempting to incite a race war and that she supported and endorsed the subjugation and persecution of white people" based on fake Twitter posts attributed to Gopal.

==== Criticism of Tony Sewell, chair of the Commission on Race and Ethnic Disparities ====
In March 2021, the Commission on Race and Ethnic Disparities, chaired by educational consultant Tony Sewell, released its report on race and ethnic disparities in the UK. Gopal argued the report cherry-picked data and minimised and denied structural and institutional racism, asserting that it read like a propaganda document rather than a piece of research. She also questioned whether Sewell had a doctorate. When she learned he did, Gopal tweeted: "Okay, established. It is, in fact, Dr Sewell. Fair enough. Even Dr Goebbels had a research PhD. (University of Heidelberg, 1921)". The comparison to Goebbels, a prominent Nazi, attracted criticism from commentators writing for The Times and The Daily Telegraph. Gopal said that her remark was a reference to Goebbels, not a comparison.

==== Anti-Semitism dispute ====
In January 2022, Gopal tweeted that historian David Abulafia's description of fellow historian David Olusoga as 'eloquent' could sound dismissive, particularly when pertaining to writers of colour. Abulafia told Varsity that he thought it was "insulting or possibly libellous" to infer that his remark had a racist overtone.

Gopal said that the news editor of Varsity concocted the story about her supposed charge of 'racism' against Abulafia, commenting that she had become a target because she had criticised the IHRA definition of anti-Semitism. She said that the news editor was among those who lobbied to adopt the definition in full. She also said that one student journalist behind the story had "quite powerful familial connections to the liberal media", and that the criticism of her in the student newspaper Varsity was not "quite the little campus story ... that it is supposed to be".

The Cambridge University Jewish Society and Abulafia, noting that Abulafia and the students were Jewish, condemned Gopal's remarks as evoking anti-Semitic conspiracy theories. Gopal released a statement saying that Varsity had "published misleading and false claims" about her words that had subjected her to "a concerted racist and misogynist attack across the British right-wing press."

== Bibliography ==
=== Books ===
- Literary Radicalism in India: Gender, Nation and the Transition to Independence (Routledge, 2005)
- The Indian English Novel: Nation, History and Narration (Oxford University Press, 2009)
- Insurgent Empire: Anticolonial Resistance and British Dissent (Verso Books, 2019)

=== Articles ===
- "Of Victims and Vigilantes: The 'Bandit Queen' Controversy". Thamyris Amsterdam. vol. 4, no. 1, pp. 73–102 (1997)
- "'Curious Ironies': Matter and Meaning in Bhabhani Bhattacharya's Novel of the 1943 Bengal Famine". ARIEL: A Review of International English Literature. vol. 32, no. 3, pp. 61–88 (2001)
- "Sex, space and modernity in the work of Rashid Jahan, 'Angareywali'". Marxism, Modernity and Postcolonial Studies. pp. 150–166 (2002)
- "Reading subaltern history". The Cambridge Companion to Postcolonial Literary Studies. pp. 139–161 (2004)
- "The'Moral Empire': Africa, globalisation and the politics of conscience". New Formations. issue 59, pp. 81–98 (2006)
- "Concerning Maoism: Fanon, Revolutionary Violence, and Postcolonial India". South Atlantic Quarterly. vol. 112, no. 1, pp. 115–128 (2013)
- "Speaking with Difficulty: Feminism and Antiracism in Britain after 9/11". Feminist Studies. vol. 39, no. 1, pp. 98–118 (2013)
- "Redressing anti-imperial amnesia". Race & Class. vol. 57, no. 3, pp. 18–30 (2016)
- "Of Capitalism and Critique: 'Af-Pak' Fiction in the Wake of 9/11". South-Asian Fiction in English: Contemporary Transformations. pp. 21–36 (2016)
- "On Decolonisation and the University". Textual Practice. vol. 35, no. 6, pp. 873–899 (2021)
