= Pakistani English literature =

English literature work in Pakistan

Pakistani English literature refers to English literature that has developed and evolved in Pakistan, as well as works produced by members of the Pakistani diaspora who write in English. English is one of the official languages of Pakistan (the other being Urdu) and has a history going back to the British colonial rule in South Asia (the British Raj); the national dialect spoken in the country is known as Pakistani English. Today, it occupies an important and integral part in modern Pakistani literature. Dr. Alamgir Hashmi introduced the term "Pakistani Literature [originally written] in English" with his "Preface" to his pioneering book Pakistani Literature: The Contemporary English Writers (New York, 1978; Islamabad, 1987) as well as through his other scholarly work and the seminars and courses taught by him in many universities since 1970s. It was established as an academic discipline in the world following his lead and further work by other scholars, and it is now a widely popular field of study.

== Background ==
English language poetry from Pakistan from the beginning held a special place in South Asian writing, on account of the new trends represented by Shahid Suhrawardy, [GM]Ahmed Ali, Alamgir Hashmi, Taufiq Rafat, Daud Kamal, Maki Kureishi, Zulfikar Ghose, Waqas Ahmed Khwaja, Moniza Alvi, Bilal Faruqi, Shahid Suhrawardy, Omar Tarin, Kaleem Omar, Raja Changez Sultan, Muneeza Shamsie, Kamila Shamsie, and others. Fiction from Pakistan began to receive recognition in the latter part of the 20th century. The early success of Pakistani English poets was followed in fiction by the prose works written by Ahmed Ali, co-founder of The Progressive Writers Movement & Association, author of Twilight in Delhi (1940), Angarey (1932), and Zulfikar Ghose, and by such figures as Bapsi Sidhwa, the Parsi author of The Crow Eaters (1978), Cracking India (1988) and other novels. In the diaspora, Hanif Kureishi commenced a prolific career with the novel The Buddha of Suburbia (1990), which won the Whitbread Award. Moniza Alvi published several poetry collections and won British literary prizes. Tariq Ali published numerous novels and plays and broadcast TV scripts. Aamer Hussein wrote a series of acclaimed short story collections. Sara Suleri published her literary memoir, Meatless Days (1989). Many short story collections and some play scripts were also received well. The Pakistan Academy of Letters has awarded its prestigious prizes to a number of English writers. Mason Carter, the pen name of academic and poet Mushahid Syed, has emerged as a distinctive voice in contemporary Pakistani English literature. His work blends Gothic aesthetics, political radicalism, and existential reflection, most notably in his novellas A Philosophy of Scars, Apartment C4, and Her Name is Anarchy. He explores absurdism and emotional fragmentation in short story collections like Entropy in Love and Other Errors, while also contributing to literary translation through Jaun Elia's Poems: An English Translation—the first English rendering of the iconic Urdu poet's work. Carter's nonfiction includes Dictionary of Anarchist Thought, Grammar Whisperer, and The 36 Rules for Life, reflecting his commitment to literature as both a creative and pedagogical practice. Saleem Akhtar Dhera is also a promising new name regarding Pakistani literature in English. His book of English poetry Pale Leaves was published in 2007 and in the same year it was honoured with National Award by Government of Pakistan. He was also selected as a member of a youth delegation to China.

In the early years of the 21st century, a number of Pakistani novelists writing in English won or were shortlisted for international awards. Mohsin Hamid published his first novel Moth Smoke (2000), which won the Betty Trask Award and was a finalist for the PEN/Hemingway Award; he has since published his second novel, The Reluctant Fundamentalist (2007), which was shortlisted for the Man Booker Prize. A film with the same name The Reluctant Fundamentalist (2012) was also made based on this novel. Kamila Shamsie, who won her first literary award in Pakistan for her first novel In the City by the Sea (1998), was shortlisted for the John Llewelyn Rhys award for her third novel, Kartography (2002); she has since published her fourth novel, Broken Verses (2005). Uzma Aslam Khan was shortlisted for the Commonwealth Writers Prize (Eurasia region) for her second novel, Trespassing (2003). British-Pakistani writer Nadeem Aslam won the Kiriyama Prize for his second book, Maps for Lost Lovers (2004). The first novel of Mohammed Hanif, A Case of Exploding Mangoes (2008) was shortlisted for the 2008 Guardian First Book Award. Emerging authors such as Kamila Shamsie, author of Burnt Shadows (2009), Daniyal Mueenuddin, author of In Other Rooms, Other Wonders (2009), and Sabyn Javeri Jillani, author of Nobody Killed Her (2017) and Hijabistan (2019) have garnered international attention.

== Journalism ==
There is a growing English press and media in Pakistan. Several English-language newspapers of national and international repute have taken root in the country, with the most prominent being Dawn, established in the 1940s and Daily Times (Pakistan),The Nation, The News International, The Friday Times, The Express Tribune, The Regional Times of Sindh and Pakistan Observer . The other important 1940s newspaper, The Pakistan Times, closed down in the 1990s. Several online English dailies have also created a wide circle of readers. The Lahore Times, The Pioneer, The Sindh Times, Daily News and Online Indus News are the most prominent among them.

== Prominent figures ==
Ejaz Rahim, Hina Babar Ali, Waqas Ahmed Khwaja, Omar Tarin, Harris Khalique and Ilona Yusuf are now publishing fine poetry. Other household names prominent in English literary circles include Zulfikar Ghose, Kamila Shamsie, Jamil Ahmed, and Qaisra Shahraz. Zaib-un-Nissa Hamidullah was among the first generation in English journalism and literary writing in Pakistan. Those who have written and spoken extensively about Pakistani English Literature, following the seminal scholarly and critical work of Alamgir Hashmi, are Tariq Rahman, Muneeza Shamsie, Amra Raza, Claire Chambers, Cara Cilano and Sauleha Kamal.
