= Minor Detail (novel) =

2017 novel by Palestinian author Adania Shibli

- Cover of the New Directions edition
- Author: Adania Shibli
- Original title: تفصيل ثانوي
- Translator: Elisabeth Jaquette
- Language: Arabic
- Genre: Fiction
- Publisher: Fitzcarraldo Editions (UK); New Directions Publishing (US); Text Publishing (Australia)
- Media type: Book
- Pages: 112 pages (UK); 105 pages (US); 176 pages (Australia)
- ISBN: 9781913097172 for the UK edition. See text for ISBN for other editions.
- OCLC: 1117463562
- Dewey Decimal: 892.737

Minor Detail (Arabic: تفصيل ثانوي, romanized: Tafṣīl Thānawī) is a 2017 novel by the Palestinian author Adania Shibli. It was translated into English by Elisabeth Jaquette in 2020.

It has two parts, first recalling a true story of the Nirim affair, a 1949 gang rape and murder of a young Arab Bedouin-Palestinian girl by Israeli soldiers, and in the second part, telling of a fictional modern day account of life of a Palestinian woman who tries to investigate this incident.

The novel was nominated for a National Book Award for Translated Literature in 2020, longlisted for the International Booker Prize in 2021, and won the LiBeraturpreis in 2023.

== Development ==
Minor Detail is Shibli's third novel, written over the course of 12 years. It was written in Arabic, first published in that language in 2017, and translated to English by Elisabeth Jaquette in 2020. It is based on a true story.

== Plot ==
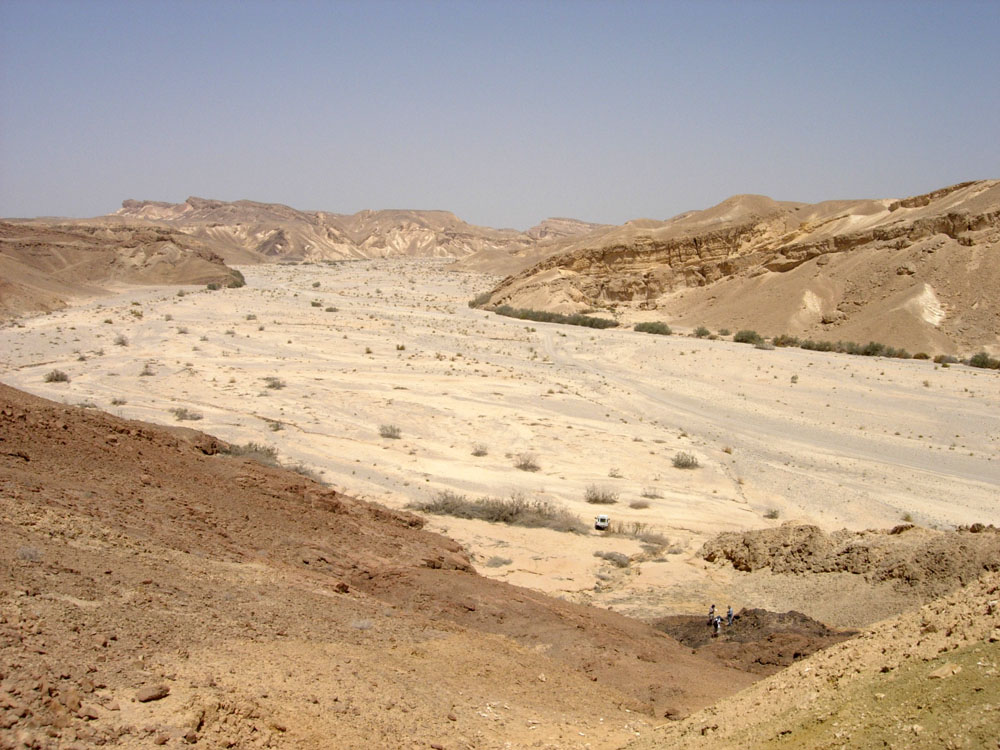
Negev desert where part of the novel takes place.

The novel recounts in its first part an historical event, the gang rape and murder of a young Bedouin-Palestinian girl in 1949 by Israeli soldiers near Nirim in the Negev desert (known as the Nirim affair).

The second part concerns a modern-day person, an unnamed female inhabitant of Ramallah, who learns about the 1949 incident from a newspaper record, becomes haunted by it as it shares the same date as her birthday, and tries to investigate the incident by visiting museum archives (including the Israel Defense Forces History Museum). Her investigation is made difficult by the travel restriction faced by the Palestinians. Eventually, having violated the travel restrictions, she has a confrontation with the IDF on the same spot as the Bedouin girl.

== Analysis ==
Several reviewers commented on the literary style of the work. In The Guardian, Anthony Cummins observed that "The language, as light on judgment as a stage direction, is highly disconcerting... events are recorded minutely but without emotion". In a second review in The Guardian, Bhutto commented that "The settlers and soldiers she describes in the second half of the novel are rendered with no malice or artifice". In ArtReview, Nirmala Devi wrote that "The narrative is told in the third person, often coldly analytic in tone... The only emotional presence in the narrative comes in the shape of the victim’s dog. And no one can understand it either." Further, Shibli's detached style has been compared to Albert Camus’ The Stranger.

=== Translations ===
The novel was first published in Arabic in 2017 and has since been translated into several languages. Selected editions include:

Language	Title	Translator	Publisher	Year	ISBN
Spanish	Un detalle menor	Salvador Peña Martín	Hoja de Lata Editorial	2019	ISBN 9788416537570
English	Minor Detail	Elisabeth Jaquette	Fitzcarraldo Editions (UK); New Directions Publishing (US); Text Publishing (Australia)	2020	ISBN 9781913097172 (UK); ISBN 9780811229074 (US); ISBN 9781922268693 (Australia)
French	Un détail mineur	Stéphanie Dujols	Sindbad / Actes Sud	2020	ISBN 9782330142094
Turkish	Küçük Bir Ayrıntı	Mehmet Hakkı Suçin	Can Yayınları	2021	ISBN 9789750752551
Italian	Un dettaglio minore	Monica Ruocco	La nave di Teseo	2021	ISBN 9788834606162
German	Eine Nebensache	Günther Orth	Berenberg Verlag	2022	ISBN 9783949203213
Portuguese	Um Detalhe Menor	Hugo Maia	Publicações Dom Quixote	2022	ISBN 9789722074421
Polish	Drobny szczegół	Hanna Jankowska	Wydawnictwo Drzazgi	2023	ISBN 9788396898807
Dutch	Een klein detail	Djûke Poppinga	Koppernik	2023	ISBN 9789083274355
Indonesian	Detail Kecil	Zulfah Nur Alimah	Bentang Pustaka	2024	ISBN 9786231864314
Serbian	Sporedan detalj	Dragana Đorđević	Laguna	2024	ISBN 9788652152582

== Reception ==
=== English translation ===
In 2020 the book was reviewed for The Guardian by Anthony Cummins and Fatima Bhutto. Cummins called the book a "highly sophisticated narrative that pitilessly explores the limits of empathy and the desire to right... historical wrongs by giving voice to the voiceless". Bhutto called Shibli's writing "subtle and sharply observed", concluding that "The book is, at varying points, terrifying and satirical; at every turn, dangerously and devastatingly good".

Katie da Cunha Lewin, reviewing the novel for the Los Angeles Review of Books, described the book as "an intense and penetrating work about the profound impact of living with violence", concluding that "Shibli’s work is powerful and this translation by Elisabeth Jaquette is rendered with exquisite clarity and quiet control".

Egina Manachova, for the Chicago Review, called the novel as "sparse, unnerving, and haunting". She praised the quality of the translation, and described the binding element of the two parts of the novels as the concept of Nakba (the destruction of the Palestinian society and homeland in 1948, and the permanent displacement of a majority of the Palestinian Arabs). She commented on the fact that no characters in the novels are named, while the book also provides the changing names (formerly, Palestinian, now, Israeli) for various locations, arguing that it represents a "process of land expropriation and displacement".

Christopher Linforth, in World Literature Today, wrote that the novel "cements [Shibli]'s position among the top ranks of Palestinian novelists working today", calling the work "short but powerful", and praising the division of novel into two parts.

Nirmala Devi, writing in ArtReview, summarised the theme as "ostensibly a tale about the banality of brutality and the ability of the powerful to erase the powerless", concluding that the novel and its translation are "extraordinary masterclass in how to do things with words and the lacunae in between".

Writing for The New York Times, Abhrajyoti Chakraborty commented on the novel's two-part structure, writing that "perhaps the details in the two stories mirror each other because the past isn’t even past".

=== German translation and the LiBeraturpreis ===
Following the publication of the German edition in 2022, in 2023 the novel was selected for the LiBeraturpreis 2023 by the German literary organisation LitProm. A few days before the announced date, LitProm cancelled the ceremony at the Frankfurt Book Fair and postponed it to an unspecified date, citing the ongoing Gaza war. More than 1,000 authors and intellectuals, including Colm Tóibín, Hisham Matar, Kamila Shamsie, William Dalrymple as well as Nobel Prize winners Abdulrazak Gurnah, Annie Ernaux, and Olga Tokarczuk, criticised the Frankfurt Book Fair and wrote in an open letter that the Book Fair had “a responsibility to be creating spaces for Palestinian writers to share their thoughts, feelings, reflections on literature through these terrible, cruel times, not shutting them down”.

Before the Book Fair decision, the book had attracted criticism from several German critics. Ulrich Noller, a journalist on the Litprom jury, resigned from the jury in protest, claiming that the novel has “anti-Israel and antisemitic narratives". Similar sentiments were echoed by Carsten Otte, a literary critic associated with the German newspaper Die Tageszeitung, who wrote that the book contained a white-and-black narrative: “All Israelis are anonymous rapists and killers, while the Palestinians are victims of poisoned or trigger-happy occupiers.”

On 12 October, the prominent literary critic Iris Radisch spoke out in favour of the awarding of the prize in Die Zeit weekly magazine. She referred to the international recognition that the novel had received, saying that it was also "rightly celebrated as a literary masterpiece" by German literary critics. Radisch wrote that an outstanding literary novel by a Palestinian writer now being associated with the "current mass murders of Hamas" had nothing to do with serious literary criticism. In his article of 13 October in the Frankfurter Allgemeine Zeitung, literary scholar and journalist Paul Ingendaay referred to an interview with Shibli that he had conducted in 2022, quoting Shibli's statements as a writer interested in the literary representation of topics such as control and fear of a person, thereby enabling the author and reader to gain hidden insights about themselves. Shibli condemned any form of nationalism and had spoken out in favour of "perceiving the pain of others". In response to his questions about her identity as a Palestinian, "Shibli was wary of political statements and especially of agitation. Instead, she insisted on appreciating her novel Minor Detail — and fiction writing more generally — as a place for thinking about language, place, and identity, which always depends on who is reading it”.

== Awards ==
- National Book Award for Translated Literature (finalist, 2020)
- International Booker Prize (longlist, 2021)
- LiBeraturpreis (2023)
