= Horvat Maon =

Horvat Maon may refer to:

- Horvat Maon (western Negev)
- Horvat Maon (Hebron Hills)
