= Muneeza Shamsie =

Pakistani writer (born 1944)

- Born: Muneeza Habibullah; 1944 (age 81–82)
- Occupations: Writer, columnist, biographer
- Spouse: Syed Saleem Shamsie
- Children: 2 (including Kamila Shamsie)

Muneeza Shamsie (Urdu: منیزہ شمسی; born 1944) is a Pakistani writer, critic, literary journalist, bibliographer and editor. She is the author of a literary history Hybrid Tapestries: The Development of Pakistani English Literature (Oxford University Press) and is the Bibliographic Representative of The Journal of Commonwealth Literature .

Shamsie is a regular contributor to the Dawn newspaper, as well as the Herald and Newsline magazines mostly on literary affairs; and also for the online Literary Encyclopedia.

Her memoir essays have appeared in 50 Shades of Feminism edited by Lisa Appignanesi, Rachel Holmes and Susie Orbach (Virago, 2013), Moving Worlds: 13.2 Postcolonial South Asian Cities and The Critical Muslim., The Journal of Postcolonial and Commonwealth Studies: Special Pakistan Issue .

== Life and career ==
Muneeza Shamsie was born in Lahore, British India (now Pakistan). Her family migrated to Karachi, Pakistan at partition in 1947. Her Oxford-educated father, Isha'at Habibullah (1911–1991), a company executive in a British firm, played a leading role in developing the corporate sector in the newly created Pakistan and became the first Pakistani to head a multi-national company in the country. Her mother, Jahanara Habibullah (1915–2003) is the author of a memoir, first published as an English translation and later, in the original Urdu as Zindagi ki Yadein: Riyasat Rampur ka Nawabi Daur

Shamsie grew up in a home where books and the written word were a part of family life. Her aunt was the noted feminist and writer Attia Hosain (1913–1998). Shamsie's grandmother in Lucknow, feminist and activist, Begum Inam Fatima Habibullah was the author of a travelogue Tassiraat-e-Safar-Europe. The travelogue is about her journey to Britain in 1924 with her husband, Sheikh Mohammed Habibullah, OBE, a Taluqdar of Oudh, and their visit with their sons at Clifton College. Shamsie was sent away to school in England at the age of nine, and has written a memoir essay, "A Tale of Two Childhoods: Colonial and Post-colonial" in The Journal of Postcolonial and Commonwealth Studies 16.1, in which she juxtaposes her father's experience of England with her own, a generation later, and their respective adjustment to their homelands on their return. In the essay, she writes of being a boarder at Wispers School in Sussex and near Midhurst when she joined and moved to West Dean near Chichester in 1958. She took Chemistry, Biology and History in her A-Levels and wanted to pursue a career in science - then discovered there were no careers for women scientists in Pakistan - in fact, Pakistan had few career opportunities for women at all, except education and medicine.

All this while, in England Shamsie had become very aware of the acutely limited and stereotyped images of the sub-continent in English literature, culture and film. On her return to Pakistan, she realized how little she knew or understood about her country and she started to look for answers in the genre she loved best: fiction. V.S. Naipaul, Khushwant Singh, Ahmed Ali, Mumtaz Shahnawaz, Zulfikar Ghose — and of course Attia Hosain — were among the early post-independence writers she read. Soon she came to know and attended readings by, a new young generation of English language poets in Pakistan who were forging a new contemporary Pakistani English literature. In the introduction to her literary history Hybrid Tapestries she describes how her interest in writing and books, developed from the personal view to the professional view when she started to write freelance for the Dawn Magazine Supplement in 1982. This enabled her to keep track of new developments in creative and critical writings which were given further context when she was sent by the British Council to attend the 1999 Cambridge Seminar on the Contemporary British Writer. All these influences emerge in the three anthologies that she has compiled and edited and ultimately her literary history, Hybrid Tapestries: The Development of Pakistani Literature in English, which marks her out as the leading authority on Pakistani English literature today.

As a freelance journalist, however, she has also written on a wide range of subjects, including archaeology, art, architecture, development, environment and women's issues. She is a founding member of a Karachi hospital, The Kidney Centre and a Life Member of The Association of Children With Emotional and Learning Problems (ACELP), and she did voluntary work teaching music and mime at ACELP's school in the 1970s.

She is on the International Advisory Board of Journal of Postcolonial Writing and has guest-edited two of its Special Issue Volume 47 Issue 2, 2011: Beyond Geography: Literature, Politics and Violence in Pakistan; and Volume 52 Issue 2, 2016: Al-Andalus.

She is on the Advisory Committee of the DSC Prize for South Asian Literature and served as a 2013 jury member. From 2009 to 2011, she served as regional chair (Eurasia) for The Commonwealth Writers Prize

She is editor of three pioneering anthologies of Pakistani English literature, of which the US edition of And the World Changed Contemporary Stories by Pakistani Women received the Gold IPPY award and the Bronze Foreword Award in the United States.

== Personal life ==
In 1968, Muneeza Shamsie married Syed Saleem Shamsie, a company executive, and they have two daughters, the novelist Kamila Shamsie, and the children's writer, Saman Shamsie.

== Books ==
- Hybrid Tapestries: The Development of Pakistani Literature in English (2017) ISBN 978-0-19-940353-0

== Books edited ==
- A Dragonfly in the Sun: An Anthology of Pakistani Writing in English (1997), ISBN 0-19-577784-0
- Leaving Home: Towards A New Millennium: A Collection of English Prose by Pakistani Writers (2001), ISBN 0-19-579529-6
- And The World Changed: Contemporary Stories by Pakistani Women (2005), ISBN 81-88965-23-5
- And The World Changed: Contemporary Stories by Pakistani Women (2008) (US edition), ISBN 978-1-55861-580-9

== See also ==
- List of Pakistani journalists
