= Suzanne Ibrahim =

Syrian-Swedish poet, writer, journalist, and translator

- سوزان إبراهيم
- Born: Syria
- Occupations: Poet, writer, journalist, translator
- Writing career
- Language: Arabic, Swedish

Suzanne Ibrahim (Arabic: سوزان إبراهيم) is a Syrian-Swedish poet, writer, journalist, and translator. She has published several collections of poetry and prose in Arabic and Swedish, and some of her works have been translated into French, English, Catalan, Spanish, and Persian.

== Early life and education ==
Ibrahim was born in Syria and studied English Literature at Al-Baath University, where she also obtained a diploma in Educational Qualification.

== Career ==
Ibrahim began her professional career as a translator before moving into cultural journalism, contributing articles and interviews to Syrian and Arab newspapers.

In 2015, she was appointed Director of Translation at the Syrian General Book Organization, an institution affiliated with the Ministry of Culture. During her tenure, she launched the "African Creations" translation series. She later returned to the state-run newspaper Al-Thawra, where she worked until early 2018.

After relocating to Sweden in 2018, Ibrahim continued her literary and journalistic activities. In an interview with the Swedish journalists' union magazine, she described the pressures of working between censorship and threats in Syria. She was also profiled in the labor magazine Arbetet, where she discussed her survival during the conflict.

Her career in Sweden has been covered by local and national media. Länstidningen Östersund featured her as the city's ICORN writer, where she spoke about the war in Syria and life in Östersund, and Östersunds-Posten highlighted her Swedish-language literary debut and her views on Syria's future.

Ibrahim has been profiled by the Swedish literary network Författarförmedling, and has participated in major literary events such as Littfest in Umeå. She has also been involved with Svenska PEN, World Culture International, and other cultural organizations in Sweden and Europe.

== Literary works ==
Ibrahim has published several collections of poetry, short stories, and prose works in Arabic and Swedish. Her notable publications include:

- Let It Be the Will of Spring (2003), poetry.
- When the Time of Love Comes (2003), short stories.
- A Yellow Woman Painting in Blue (2005), short stories.
- Because I Am for You (2009), fiction.
- You Are Many (2010), poetry, published by Dar Al-Takween. ISBN 978-9933-466-52-7.
- Aquarelle (2014), poetry. ISBN 9789933429270.
- I Have Now Become a Forest (2016), poetry, later translated into French. ISBN 978-9933-466-52-7.
- When the Wind Explodes Against My Skin (2019), autobiographical novel in Swedish, published by Teg Publishing. ISBN 9789188035448.
- No Doves Above the City (2021), narrative prose based on her diaries from the Syrian civil war. ISBN 978-977-751-653-2.
- With Every Possible Doubt (2022), poetry. ISBN 9789933661311.

== ICORN and relocation to Sweden ==
In 2018, Ibrahim relocated to Sweden through the International Cities of Refuge Network (ICORN) program. She lived in Östersund between 2018 and 2020, where she continued her literary work. After completing her ICORN residency, she remained in Sweden and participated in cultural activities, including the Biskops-Arnö Writing Workshop in 2023.

== Translations ==
Several of Ibrahim's works have been translated into French, Swedish, English, Catalan, Spanish, and Persian. French translations by Mohamed Salah Ben Amor include:

- My Flying Heart (2015).
- I Have Now Become a Forest (2017).
- White Path: Swedish Poems (2019).

== Reception ==
Ibrahim's autobiographical novel När vinden exploderar mot min hud (When the Wind Explodes Against My Skin) was reviewed in the Swedish daily Göteborgs-Posten, where literary critic Ragnar Strömberg described it as "a moving diary from Damascus," highlighting its emotional transparency.

Her life and literary work have also been discussed in the Swedish press, including an interview in Arbetet where she reflected on her survival during the Syrian conflict.

She has been featured on Swedish national radio, where she spoke about her writing and experiences of war and exile.

Her poetry and prose have been published in international journals such as Words and Worlds Magazine, which featured her work in its 2022 winter issue.

Her presence in the Swedish literary scene has also been recognized by Svenska PEN, which highlighted her works during the Day of the Imprisoned Writer.

In the Swedish literary magazine Vi Läser (Winter 2018, issue 6), she was described as "no longer needing to be afraid," highlighting the importance of Sweden offering her a safe space.

== Awards and residencies ==
In 2015, Ibrahim was featured in the anthology Poetic Faces from the World by Mohamed Salah Ben Amor.

Ibrahim has also participated in international literary residencies and festivals, including:

- the Stig Dagerman Literary Residency in Uppsala, Sweden,
- the Vil.la Joana Residency in Barcelona, Spain,
- events at Litteraturhuset i Trondheim, Norway, where she was featured as a guest author,
- PEN Català international programs in Spain,
- participation in the Barcelona UNESCO City of Literature events.

She has also received cultural grants and awards in Sweden, including a special stipend from the publishing house Natur & Kultur in 2018, and a regional cultural stipend from Jämtland Härjedalen in 2021. She was also recognized by Svenska PEN for her participation in the 2024 Freedom of Expression Day in Östersund.
