= Maon =

Maon may refer to:

== Places in Israel/Palestine ==
- Bethmaus, Beth Maʿon, or Maon: ancient town in Galilee
- Ma'on, Har Hevron, a Jewish settlement in the Hebron Hills area, southern West Bank
- Horvat Maon (Hebron Hills)/Khirbet Ma'in & Tell Ma'in, ancient biblical city in Judea, now a ruin. See also under List of minor biblical places: Maon, city and wilderness in Judah, mentioned in the Hebrew Bible.
- Horvat Maon (western Negev), archaeological site located 20 kilometres (12 mi) southwest of Gaza

== Other ==
- Preon, theoretical component of quarks
- Maon (planthopper), a planthopper in the Eurybrachidae family
- Maon Kurosaki (1988–2023), a Japanese singer-songwriter

== See also ==
- Mahon (disambiguation)
- Typhoon Ma-on (disambiguation)
