= Juergen Boos =

President and CEO of Frankfurt Book Fair

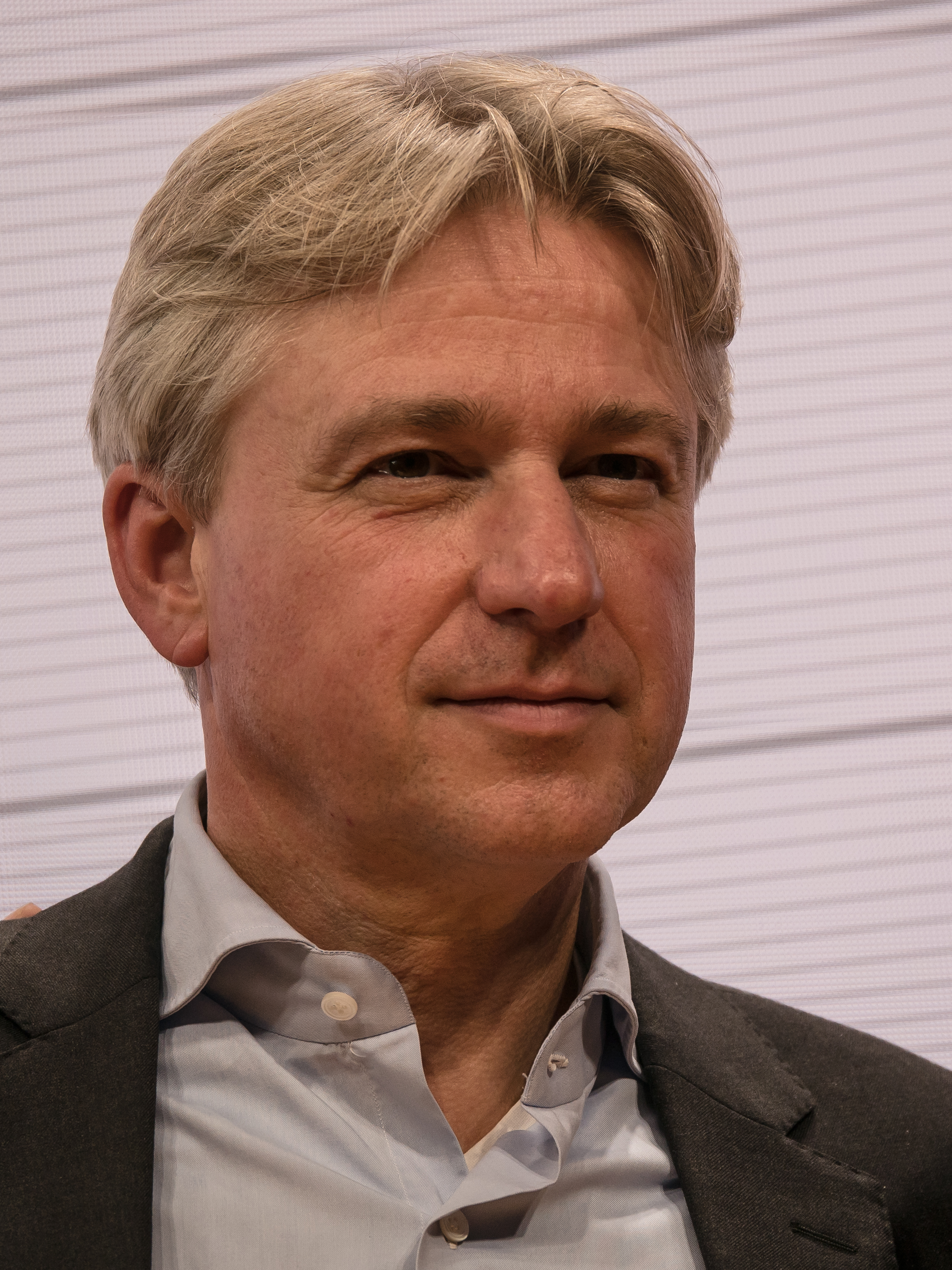
- Boos at the Frankfurt Book Fair in 2017
- Born: May 9, 1961 (age 65); Lörrach
- Other name: Jürgen Boss

Juergen Boos (born 9 May 1961 in Lörrach, Germany) is the President and CEO of Frankfurt Book Fair.

== Biography ==
Juergen Boos trained as a publisher at Herder Verlag (Freiburg) in the early 1980s and has degrees in both Marketing and Organisational Theory. He has held management positions at Droemer Knaur Verlag (Munich), Carl Hanser Verlag (Munich), as well as Springer Science and Business Media (Berlin) and John Wiley & Sons (Weinheim).

Boos became President and CEO of the Frankfurter Buchmesse GmbH (Frankfurt Book Fair) in 2005 and is President of LitProm (Society for the Promotion of African, Asian and Latin American Literature) and Managing Director of LitCam (Frankfurter Buchmesse Literacy Campaign). In January 2017, Boos received an honorary degree from the Ivane Javakhishvili Tbilisi State University. He is also a member of the Scientific Committee of Sheikh Zayed Book Award and a member of Akademie Deutscher Buchpreis (German Book Prize Academy). In February 2018, Boos was awarded the Chevalier des Arts et des Lettres. On 5 October 2022, he received the "Vigdís International Prize" named after Vigdís Finnbogadóttir, former President of Iceland and current UNESCO Ambassador for the Promotion of Linguistic Diversity, which is jointly awarded by the Icelandic government, the University of Iceland, and the Vigdís International Centre for Multilingualism and Intercultural Understanding. During the state visit of the Spanish royal couple to the Frankfurt Book Fair in 2022, Juergen Boos was awarded the "Encomienda de Número de la Orden de Isabel la Católica". In 2022 Boos was awarded the international Vigdís Prize, an award conferred for outstanding contributions to world languages and cultures, for his tireless support of languages and cultures in his capacity as CEO of the Frankfurt Book Fair. On 11 February 2023, Juergen Boos was made a Knight 1st Class of the Royal Norwegian Order of Merit by King Harald V of Norway. On 6 October 2026, the opening day of the 2026 Frankfurt Book Fair, Juergen Boos was awarded the Friedrich Perthes Prize in recognition of his commitment to the book industry.He is a member of PEN Berlin.

== Controversies ==
In 2009 when China was the 'guest country' of the Frankfurt Book Fair, Boos ran into controversy. After a protest of the official Chinese delegation, Boos excluded two Chinese dissident writers from a symposium. Boos later reversed his decision, prompting another Chinese protest.

Boos later explained in an official statement that the Frankfurt Book Fair always was a "marketplace for freedom" and because of that having China as the annual 'guest country' was expected to be a tightrope walk in some fields. He furthermore explained that dialogue is always important and that no compromise at the expense of freedom of expression can be made. He also apologized to the public and to the two shortly excluded authors.

In 2015, Boos invited Salman Rushdie to be the speaker of the opening press conference of Frankfurter Buchmesse. The Iranian Government protested against this invitation and the Iranian Ministry of Culture cancelled their presence at the fair last minute.
