= Nirim affair =

1949 Israeli gang rape and murder case

- Nirim affair (Israel)
- Date: August 12, 1949- August 13, 1949; 77 years ago
- Target: Bedouin teenager
- Attack type: Gang rape, Murder
- Deaths: 2
- Perpetrator: Israeli Defense Force

The Nirim affair was a gang rape and murder committed by Israeli Defense Force soldiers on August 12 and 13, 1949. In subsequent trials, twenty men were convicted of a range of crimes. The Nirim affair was revealed in a 2003 Haaretz article. It is the subject of Adania Shibli's 2017 novel Minor Detail.

== The events ==
Soldiers on patrol near a military outpost at Nirim came across a Bedouin man and girl (estimated age between 10 and 15). They shot and killed the man and brought the girl to the camp. There she was stripped naked, forcibly washed before the assembled soldiers, and her hair was cut off.

In the evening, the commanders had the soldiers vote on whether the girl would be used as a domestic servant or be raped. The soldiers voted for rape and she was raped. The next morning, the girl protested and was shot and her body was buried in the desert.

== Location ==
The crimes took place not at modern-day Nirim, but at a military outpost fifteen kilometers south, which was the site of the original Nirim kibbutz and of the Battle of Nirim. Today it is the site of Nir Yitzhak.

== Trial ==
A military court sentenced the two commanders for murder; Second Lieutenant Moshe served 15 years in prison. Seventeen soldiers were sentenced from one to three years for negligence or complicity. One soldier, who admitted guilt, was sentenced for rape.

The judgments--two cases and two appeals--were declared secret.

== Rediscovery ==
Records of the trials were included among papers relating to the 1956 Kafr Qasim massacre that were donated to the archives of the law faculty of Tel Aviv University by defense attorney Yitzhak Oren. The details were uncovered in the 1990s by law professor Yoram Shahar. A 2003 Haaretz article by journalists Aviv Lavie and Moshe Gorali, who interviewed numerous eyewitnesses, brought the case to public notice.
