= LitProm =

German literary organization

LitProm was a German registered literary organization active in the promotion of literature from Africa, Asia, Latin America and the Arab world. Between 1980 and 2024, LitProm promoted literary developments in the regions mentioned through their support for translations, authors and literary events. As English and other European languages dominate the translations of world literature on the German-language book market, LitProm aimed to counter Eurocentric views, lack of knowledge about cultural life in Africa, Asia and Latin America, prejudices and stereotyped views through literature.

Following the dissolution of LitProm on 31 December 2024, key areas of their activities, such as the promotion of literary translations from the Global South, were transferred to the Frankfurt Book Fair.

== History ==
Active in the German-speaking countries, LitProm saw itself as a central agent for the circulation of literature beyond standard western cultural notions and as a hub for international communication about literature. The association connected authors, readers and literary institutions and created a platform for literary encounters in times of globalized circulation of literary texts.

On the occasion of the Frankfurt Book Fair's focus on creative writing from sub-Saharan Africa, the society was founded in 1980 by people who were professionally involved in promoting literature, journalism and publishing. First, it was called the "Society for the Promotion of Literature from Africa, Asia and Latin America" and later changed its name to the shorter LitProm. Literary scholar Anita Djafari worked as head of the society from 2009 to 2020, followed by Juergen Boos, president of the Frankfurt Book Fair. LitProm's non-profit activities were supported by the German Protestant Church, the German government, development agencies and the Frankfurt Book Fair.

== Activities ==
=== Promotion of translations and a dedicated online database ===
Since 1984, LitProm had been the focal point for the promotion of translations of works of fiction from Africa, Asia and Latin America into German. The organization aimed to strengthen literary cultural exchange and to promote the publication of contemporary literature. Each year, about 20 books were selected for a translation subsidy, and from 1984 to 2009, more than 500 translations received funding. This programme was jointly funded by the Federal Foreign Office and the Swiss Pro Helvetia organization, and allowed authors from countries from the global south to be published in German.

Since 2008, LitProm published a quarterly list of the best literary translations from world literature, called Weltempfänger (world receiver). A jury of literary critics, writers and cultural journalists chose seven titles for each quarterly edition and presented their selection with short explanations online. LitProm's online database Quellen (Sources) contained more than 9,500 titles translated into German by authors from Asia, South America, Africa and the Arab world. All works could be searched in detail using keywords such as author, title, region, original language, translator and other information.

=== Programme „Stadt der Zuflucht“ (Cities of Refuge) ===
The International Cities of Refuge Network (ICORN) is hosting foreign authors, whose work is at risk, in different cities for at least a year, providing them with an apartment and a scholarship. The writers are expected to continue their work without restrictions and be involved in the cultural life of the respective city. For Germany, this programme had been managed by LitProm.

=== Public activities Literaturtage and Weltempfang ===
The two-day Literaturtage (Literature Days) festival took place in Frankfurt every year in January. Invited authors from all over the world engaged in conversation about a specific topic, for example "Migration - Literature without a permanent address". LitProm also was responsible for the programme Weltempfang (world reception) at the Frankfurt Book Fair. There, LitProm cooperated with other cultural organizations, for example the Instituto Cervantes, in promoting literature from Spanish-speaking countries. To promote Arabic literature and its reception in Germany, LitProm also collaborated with the Sheikh Zayed Book Awards.

=== LiBeraturpreis ===
Since 2013, LitProm awarded their LiBeraturpreis (a word play on liberate and literature) to female authors from Africa, Asia, Latin America and the Arab world. It was publicly presented each year in October at the Frankfurt Book Fair. In 2023, the LiBeraturpreis had been awarded to Palestinian author Adania Shibli for her novel Minor Detail (German: Eine Nebensache), a literary text based on the rape and murder of a Palestinian girl in 1949 by Israeli soldiers. Originally, the award ceremony of this LiBeraturpreis at the Frankfurt Book Fair had been announced for 20 October 2023. A few days before the announced date, however, LitProm canceled the ceremony. Following this controversy, the LiBeraturpreis was suspended.
