= Maon Synagogue =

6th-century synagogue and archaeological site in Israel

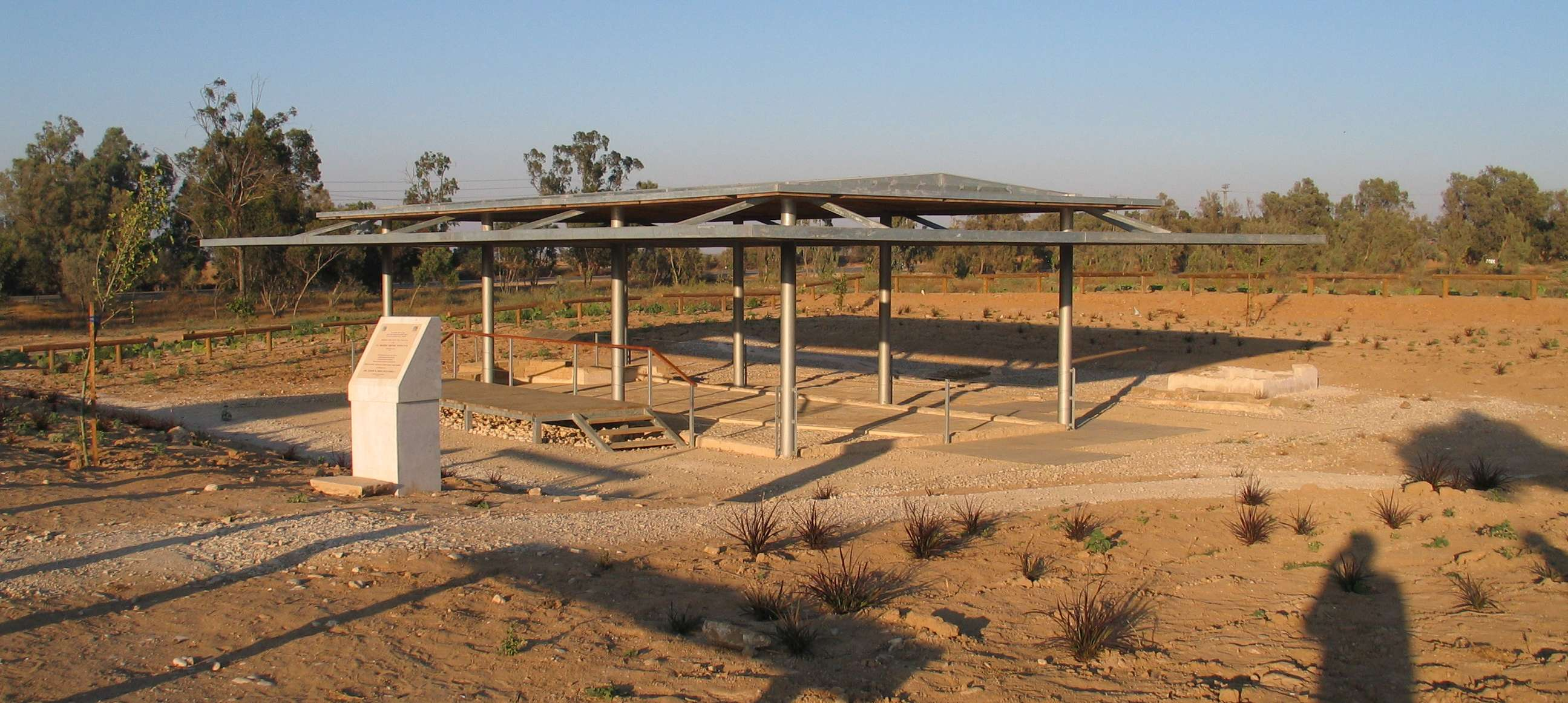

- Location of the ancient former synagogue in western Negev

Religion
- Affiliation: Judaism
- Ecclesiastical or organizational status: Synagogue; Archeological site
- Status: Abandoned

Location
- Location: Western Negev, Southern Israel
- Country: Israel
- Interactive map of Maon Synagogue
- Coordinates: 31°19′44″N 34°24′32″E

Architecture
- Type: Basilica
- Style: Byzantine
- Completed: 6th century

The Maon Synagogue is a 6th-century Jewish synagogue and archaeological site, located in the western Negev desert, near Kibbutz Nirim and Kibbutz Nir Oz, in Israel. The former synagogue is noted for its "magnificent" mosaic floor.

== Archaeological finds ==
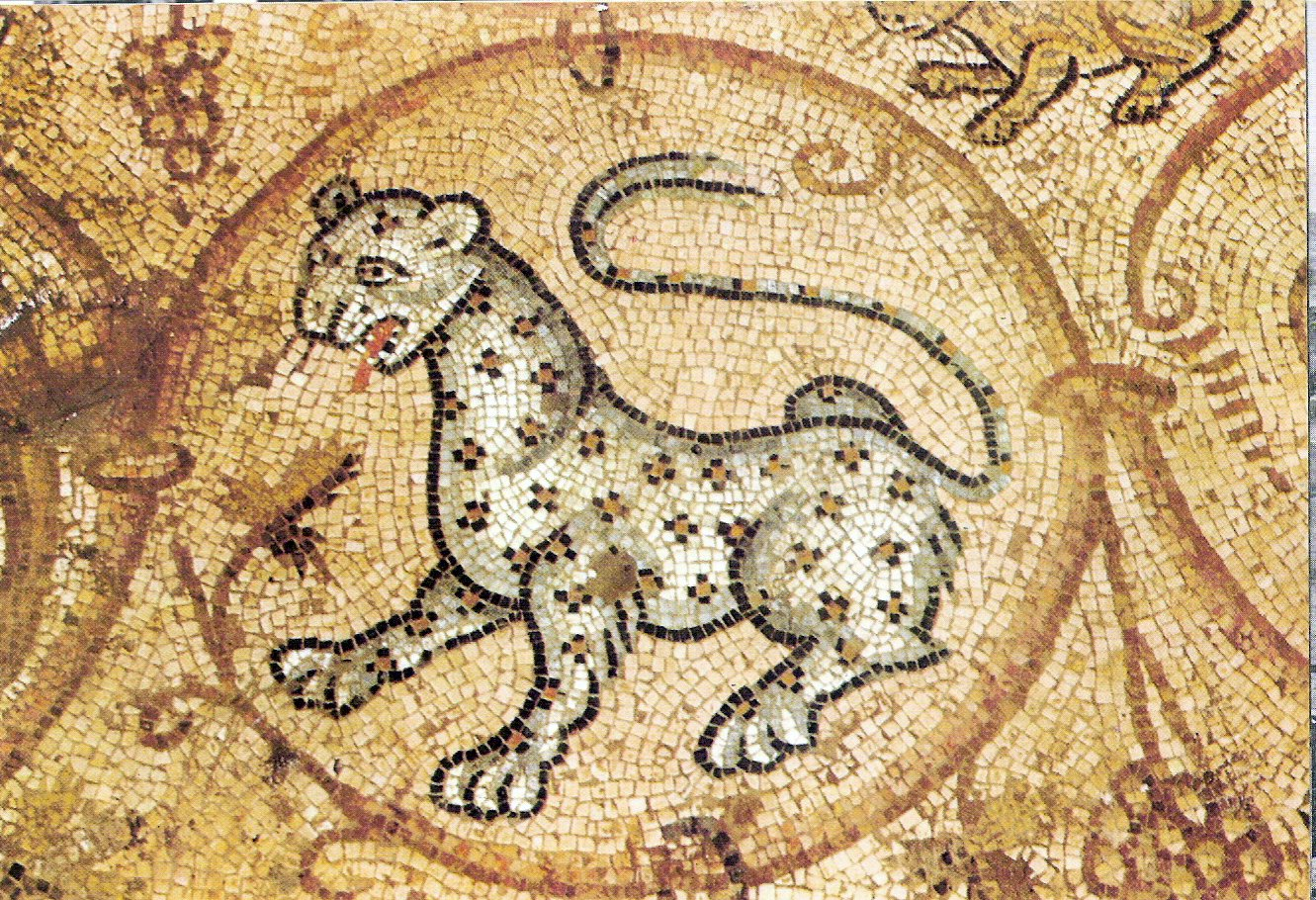
Mosaic detail

The precise construction date of the synagogue remains uncertain, though it predates the 6th century. In a sixth-century renovation, the northern wall (closest to Jerusalem) was opened, and a semi-circular apse to contain a Torah Ark was constructed. The floor level was raised and marble columns and a "breathtakingly beautiful" mosaic floor were installed.

At the bottom of the mosaic floor is an amphora flanked by a pair of peacocks. A vine flows out of the amphora, forming loops, adorned with representations of birds, animals, fruits or depictions of various stages in the winemaking process. The design is similar to the mosaics in the church floor at nearby Shallal ruins, so they are thought to have been designed by the same artist. Both floors depict animals and have similar patterns: the synagogue floor is distinguished by a menorah flanked by two lions and several other Jewish ritual objects. The seven-branched menorah stands on three legs, like the menorah in the Temple in Jerusalem. The legs in Maon are shaped like a lion's paws. Alongside the menorah are the symbols of Judah, palm trees and lions. Etrogs, a shofar and a lulav are depicted nearby. The mosaic has an inscription in Aramaic. The upper part of the inscription blesses all members of the community and the lower part honours three donors.

The synagogue is built on the basilica plan. The mosaic is in the central area, the two side aisles were paved with stone. The ceiling was made of wooden beams and clay.

A number of small objects were found by the rescue excavation on the floor facing the Torah Ark. These include coins and bone and metal artifacts that are thought to have been associated with the Torah Ark and its ornamental curtain. There were also fragments of glass and ceramic lamps. Dozens of amulets were also found, some of them were used by women who were asking for good health.

Adjacent to the ruins of the synagogue a cistern, water channels and a mikvah.

== History ==
The synagogue was built at the site of Hellenistic Menois, a city marked on the Map of Madaba. It is one of three ancient synagogues discovered in the western Negev.

The synagogue and its mosaic floor were discovered during the construction of a road in 1957. The mosaic was damaged, but the undamaged segment was preserved by a salvage excavation. After its discovery, the mosaic was neglected, causing deterioration. Restoration work began in 2006, sponsored by the Jewish National Fund, Israel Antiquities Authority and Eshkol Regional Council, and paid for by philanthropist Sandy Galet. The mosaic was lifted off its original foundation and carefully cleaned. A new foundation was installed and the mosaic was securely attached. The mosaic is now protected and was opened to the public in 2009.

== See also ==
- Ancient synagogues in Palestine – covers entire Palestine region/Land of Israel
  - Ancient synagogues in Israel – covers the modern State of Israel
- Archaeology of Israel
- History of the Jews in Israel
- List of synagogues in Israel
- Synagogues of Jerusalem
