= Menois =

Ancient town in Roman Palestine

Menois, a small town near Gaza in the Roman province of Palaestina Prima, is mentioned by Eusebius of Caesarea and other sources of the first millennium AD. Menois is believed to have been situated some 20 kilometres south of Gaza.

Eusebius identified Menois with two places of the previous millennium mentioned in the Old Testament. One is the town in the Book of Joshua that in English is usually called Madmannah. The other is the Book of Isaiah's Madmenah. Neither of these identifications is unanimously accepted by modern scholars. For those who suppose Madmenah to have been to the north of Jerusalem, this rules out its identification with Menois.

== Location of Menois ==
Menois is considered to have been situated some 20 kilometres south of Gaza and 9 kilometres east of Khan Yunis at a place named Khirbat al-Ma'in in Arabic and Horvat Ma'on in Hebrew near modern Nirim. Archaeological remains of a large settlement of the 4th century AD and later have been discovered there.

== Identification with towns from the Hebrew Bible ==
=== Madmannah of Joshua 15:31 ===
In his Onomasticon, a gazetteer of Biblical place names, Eusebius of Caesarea, who was himself of the Roman province of Palaestina Prima, said that Menois was the town mentioned in Joshua 15:31, whose Hebrew name, according to the Masoretic Text, is Madmannah, a variation for "Madmenah". Different manuscripts of the Septuagint give the name as ΜΑΧΑΡΕΙΜ (Macharim), ΒΕΔΕΒΗΝΑ (Bedebena), and ΜΑΡΑΡΕΙΜ (Mararim). The Encyclopaedia Biblica of Cheyne and Black says that the name Madmannah is a corruption of Marcaboth (in Joshua 19:5 Beth-marcaboth takes the place of Madmannah), and that Marcaboth itself is a corruption of Rehoboth.

Eusebius, writing in Greek, called the town of Joshua 15:31 Medebena: Μηδεβηνά. φυλῆς Ἰούδα. καὶ ἔστι νῦν Μηνοεὶς πλησίον Γάζης πολίχνη. κεῖται καὶ ἐν Ἡσαΐᾳ (Medebena of the tribe of Judah, now Menois, a little town near Gaza, mentioned also in Isaiah). When Jerome translated the Onomasticon into Latin, he gave the name as Medemena, a change that Negev and Gibson consider to be a correction. On the 6th-century Madaba Map an image of a city gate flanked by two towers and a segment of city wall on the left marks Menois. With a slight change of spelling from that of Eusebius, but in full agreement with the name that the Septuagint gives to the place mentioned in Isaiah 10:31 that Eusebius also refers to, the Madaba Map calls the town "Madebena, which is now Menois" (Μαδεβηνὰ ἡ νῦ[ν] Μηνοΐς).

Those who do not accept the identification of Madmannah with Minois give estimates of its current location that include Kh. Umm Deimneh (southwest of Dhahiriya) and Kh. Tatrit. Simsons equated Madmannah with Meconah, but this has not received unanimous agreement.

=== Madmenah of Isaiah 10:31 ===
Eusebius stated that the town which he called Medebena is mentioned also in Isaiah, referring to Isaiah 10:31, where the Masoretic text has Madmenah as the name of the town. The Septuagint manuscripts uniformly give the name as Madebena.

Scholars have taken the context of the mention of Madmenah in Isaiah 10:31 as indicating that it was a place whereby an army approached Jerusalem from the north. In that interpretation, its site is supposed to be Shu‘fat, 2 kilometres north of Mount Scopus.

Michael Avi-Yonah rejects this interpretation of the passage of Isaiah. In the entry "Madmena" in the Encyclopaedia Judaica, he accepts Eusebius's identification of Menois with the Madmenah of Isaiah 10:31 (but not with the town mentioned in Joshua 15:31) and locates Menois near Nirim, southeast of Gaza.

Speaking of "Madmenah (מדמנה; ΜΑΔΕΒΗΝΑ [ BאAQ ]), a supposed village of Benjamin, mentioned with Gebim, Is 10:31", the Encyclopaedia Biblica says: "Probably the name is corrupt (cp MADMEN), and we should read רמנה, Rimmonah."

== Bishopric ==
Menois was a Christian episcopal see and is included in the Catholic Church's list of titular sees.

Extant records of some synods mention individual bishops of Menois:

- Zosimus at the Second Council of Ephesus in 449 and the Council of Chalcedon in 451
- John at a 518 Synod of Jerusalem
- Stephanus at the 536 Synod of Jerusalem.
