= Home Fire (novel) =

2017 novel by Kamila Shamsie

- First edition (US)
- Author: Kamila Shamsie
- Language: English
- Genre: Novel
- Publisher: Bloomsbury (UK); Riverhead Books (US)
- Publication date: 15 August 2017
- ISBN: 978-0-7352-1768-3

Home Fire (2017) is the seventh novel by Kamila Shamsie. It reimagines Sophocles's play Antigone unfolding among British Muslims. The novel follows the Pasha family: twin siblings Aneeka and Parvaiz and their older sister Isma, who has raised them in the years since the death of their mother; their jihadi father, whom the twins never knew, is also dead. Parvaiz attempts to follow in his father's footsteps by joining ISIS in Syria. He soon decides he has made a serious mistake and his twin sister attempts to help him return to Britain, in part through her romantic relationship with Eamonn Lone, son of British Home Secretary Karamat Lone, who has built his political career on his rejection of his own Muslim background. The effort to bring Parvaiz home fails when he is shot to death trying to escape ISIS, then Eamonn and Aneeka, trying to return Parvaiz's body to the UK over the objections of Karamat Lone, die in a terrorist attack.

Home Fire won the Women's Prize for Fiction in 2018, and was longlisted for the Man Booker Prize and shortlisted for the DSC Prize for South Asian Literature 2018.

The concerns of the novel include the identity and security of Muslims in Britain. It speaks of the troubles of Muslims as they struggle to maintain a unique cultural identity while defending their ''Britishness'' and loyalty to the state against political and social activists who wish to alienate them.

== Development and publication history ==
Shamsie began Home Fire at the suggestion of London theatre director Jatinder Verma that Shamsie write a modern update of Antigone by Sophocles. Shamsie was interested in the project and quickly decided on what the story she would tell, though she preferred to pursue it as a novel rather than a play.

In an interview with The Jakarta Post, she described her writing process:

''When I read the play—which has at its center two sisters who respond differently to the legal repercussions of their brother's act of treason—I knew immediately that I wanted to connect it to a story that was very much in the news at the time, that of young British Muslims and their relationship with the British state...When you write a novel you don't think about subjects as being sensitive or not—you just think of them as being interesting and complex, and you wonder how to tell them in a story that's about a group of characters.''

The book's epigraph quotes from Seamus Heaney's translation of Antigone: "The ones we love ... are enemies of the state."

The 288-page novel was published on 15 August 2017, by Riverhead Books. It was serialised for BBC Radio 4 in April 2019.

== Synopsis ==
The novel begins with Isma Pasha detained in security at Heathrow Airport. A 28-year-old Muslim hijabi woman who has been raising her younger, twin siblings since their mother's death when the twins were 12, their reaching adulthood (now 19) has allowed Isma to pursue her long-deferred graduate studies, doing so in Massachusetts at the invitation of her former tutor at LSE, Hira Shah. Prolonged interrogation in security causes Isma to miss her flight from London to Boston, but she eventually makes her way to Amherst, Massachusetts where she settles into a routine, spending mornings in a cafe working and keeping an eye on Skype, where she sees both her younger siblings' names appear briefly each day. Isma is in contact with Aneeka, but Aneeka's twin brother Parvaiz is a source of conflict between them. At the cafe one morning, Isma spots a young man, Eamonn Lone, the son of British politician Karamat Lone, for whom Isma has a fierce dislike. Nevertheless, she strikes up a friendship with 24-year-old Eamonn, not acknowledging she is aware of his father, and soon Eamonn is joining her daily at the cafe. He is in Massachusetts staying with his white, American mother's relatives and living off family money while taking a year off from work, contrasting sharply with Isma's own modest circumstances; she worked at a drycleaner to support her younger siblings when they were orphaned.

Meanwhile in Britain, Eamonn's father is made Home Secretary, prompting Eamonn to discover Isma both knows and sharply dislikes his father. Offended, Eamonn abruptly leaves. Isma is very hurt but Hira advises her to open up to Eamonn, as Isma clearly has feelings for him. Isma is initially reluctant but in the meantime she receives a distraught call from Aneeka, who demands to know why Isma had informed on Parvaiz to the police. Aneeka says that it is Isma's fault Parvaiz cannot return to the UK. She cuts off contact with Isma, who is devastated and texts Eamonn asking to meet. She greets him without her hijab for the first time and tells him the story of her father, who was absent much of her life (and the entire lives of her young siblings), fighting as a jihadi in various conflicts. Her father was captured and held at Bagram Airfield in Afghanistan before dying in transport to Guantanamo Bay. After his death, Isma's family had sought help from the local MP to learn the details of his fate—they don't know where or even if he was buried—but the MP had brusquely turned them away, declaring the family was better off without him. This MP was Karamat Lone, Eamonn's father. Eamonn is pained to learn this, though he tries to defend his father. They reconcile, partially, though Isma is wounded when he refers to his relationship to her as like a "brother" and she makes an excuse not to see him again before he ends his sojourn in the U.S. and returns to London. But seeing photographs of her siblings as well as a pack of M&M's she has wrapped to send to her aunt, he insists on carrying the candy back to mail for her in London. When he leaves, Isma breaks down in tears, heartbroken that he does not reciprocate her romantic interest.

Back in London, Eamonn treks to Isma's aunt's house in Preston Road in Wembley—the neighborhood where his own father's family had lived—to deliver the M&M's in person. He encounters Aneeka, who is very cold to Eamonn, though when they meet a little while later on the Tube, she invites herself to his apartment and the two of them begin a romantic relationship. Eamonn finds himself falling for Aneeka and though they grow close, Aneeka insists on secrecy around their relationship, not even giving Eamonn her phone number; she tells him this is a sexual fantasy but he does overhear her once on a furtive phone call saying, “I’m making sure of things here.” The secrecy stresses their relationship but they reconcile and grow closer, with Eamonn giving her a set of keys to his apartment and ultimately proposing to her. Eventually, Aneeka confesses that her brother—who she had previously described vaguely as traveling to see the world—has in fact gone to Syria to join ISIS. Aneeka says he wants to come home but that as Home Secretary, Eamonn's father has made it very difficult. Eamonn realizes Aneeka is using him to seek assistance for her brother and is furious. However, Aneeka insists that she has fallen for him and the two make up. Eamonn goes to talk to his father about Parvaiz. But Karamat Lone absolutely refuses to help and forbids Eamonn from any further contact with Aneeka.

Moving back in time to just prior to Isma's departure, Parvaiz is working at a grocery and pursuing his interest in sound engineering; while a scholarship allows Aneeka to attend university, he cannot afford tuition. The twins spend more and more time apart, and Parvaiz encounters Farooq, whose father had fought in Bosnia with Parvaiz's father. Farooq encourages Parvaiz to learn about what happened to his father at Bagram; he is also sharply critical of the matriarchal family in which Parvaiz grew up, as well as of the British austerity measures that affect Parvaiz's life as well. He persuades Parvaiz that the ISIS Caliphate in Syria has remedied all this, showing him photos of his own time there. With Farooq's assurances that Parvaiz would be allowed to leave at any time if he wished, and also that Farooq would introduce him to others who had fought with Parvaiz's father, Parvaiz makes arrangements to visit family in Pakistan, but skips his connecting flight in Istanbul and instead travels with Farooq to the Syrian border to join ISIS. While the house they arrive at is beautiful, the rest of Farooq's promises immediately prove empty—Parvaiz's passport is confiscated on arrival and Farooq departs for the battlefront without helping him locate anyone who knew his father, leaving Parvaiz behind in Raqqa. He receives a panicked call from his sisters, who know he has missed his flight and are being interrogated by police in London, cementing Parvaiz's regret for his decision, but he is trapped. He works for the media wing of ISIS until his twin calls a few months later saying she is making a plan to help him escape, promising a new passport for him. A trip to Istanbul with Farooq to collect new recruits and audiovisual equipment provides Parvaiz an opportunity to meet Aneeka and make his escape. But Aneeka is stopped at the airport in London and, as Farooq has discovered Parvaiz has tried to escape and is now determined to find and kill him, Parvaiz decides to put himself at the mercy of the British consulate, though his father had died in the custody of British allies. But the point is moot: Parvaiz is killed in a drive-by shooting as he approaches the building.

A media frenzy around the Istanbul shooting of the British-born jihadi ensues. Karamat Lone, who has ordered an investigation, publicly discloses that Parvaiz's sister, Aneeka, had seduced his own son in an (unsuccessful) attempt to win special consideration for her terrorist brother. Additionally, as Karamat Lone's policies as Home Secretary had denaturalized Parvaiz, the UK refuses to repatriate his body and sends it to relatives in Pakistan instead. Karamat's denunciations of the Pasha family draw praise in Parliament but Aneeka is outraged and travels to Pakistan to insist that her brother be returned to the UK for burial, setting up camp in a public park with his body. Eamonn, who has been sent to a family friend's home in Normandy, returns to the public eye with the release of a video denouncing his father for preventing Aneeka from burying her brother in the UK. He then departs Normandy to join her, still keeping a vigil with her brother's body in Karachi. In London, reports of terrorist "chatter" sends Karamat Lone and his wife and daughter in a safe room. They soon receive the all clear, informed the chatter had been a hoax, but as they depart the safe room, they learn this is mistaken: there was a threat, but for Eamonn. Attacked as he arrived in the Karachi park in search of Aneeka, two men strap Eamonn into a belt loaded with explosives. The gathered crowds flee as Eamonn struggles in vain to free himself and he screams at Aneeka to run away, but she runs toward him. For a final few seconds, they embrace.

== Characters ==
In regards to Karamat Lone, Shamsie stated that initially she felt the concept of a Briton of Pakistani descent becoming a Conservative Party Home Affairs Minister as something not plausible, but reconsidered when she saw the rise of Sajid Javid, Sadiq Khan, and Sayeeda Warsi in British politics.

== Style ==
Akin to a play's five acts, the book is in five sections, each focusing on a different character's point of view, told in free indirect discourse. The novel is also set in five locations: London; Amherst, Massachusetts; Istanbul; Raqqa, Syria; and Karachi, Pakistan.

== Themes ==
Home Fire is a contemporary reimagining of the Greek tragedy Antigone and New York Times book critic Dwight Garner argued the novel "hews to [the original's] themes: civil disobedience, fidelity and the law, especially as regards burial rights."

== Reception ==
In The Guardian, Natalie Haynes said, "Shamsie’s prose is, as always, elegant and evocative. Home Fire pulls off a fine balancing act: it is a powerful exploration of the clash between society, family and faith in the modern world, while tipping its hat to the same dilemma in the ancient one." In The Washington Post, Katharine Weber said the novel "blazes with the kind of annihilating devastation that transcends grief." Dwight Garner said the novel "may seem to wobble" in middle portions, "lurching shifts of tone as it moves between matters of the heart and of state," but strongly encouraged readers to stick with Home Fire, as it "builds to one of the most memorable final scenes I've read in a novel this century."

== Awards ==
Home Fire was longlisted as a candidate for the 2017 Man Booker Prize, shortlisted for the DSC Prize for South Asian Literature 2018 and won the 2018 Women's Prize for Fiction

On 5 November 2019 BBC News listed Home Fire on its list of the 100 most influential novels.

Year	Award	Category	Result	Ref.
2017	Costa Book Awards	Novel	Shortlisted	
2017	Man Booker Prize	—	Longlisted	
2018	Australian Book Industry Awards	International Book	Shortlisted	
2018	Books Are My Bag Readers' Awards	Fiction	Shortlisted	
2018	DSC Prize for South Asian Literature	—	Shortlisted	
2018	Women's Prize for Fiction	—	Won	
2019	Europese Literatuurprijs	—	Longlisted	
2019	International Dublin Literary Award	—	Shortlisted	
