= Adania Shibli =

Palestinian author (born 1974)

- عدنية شبلي
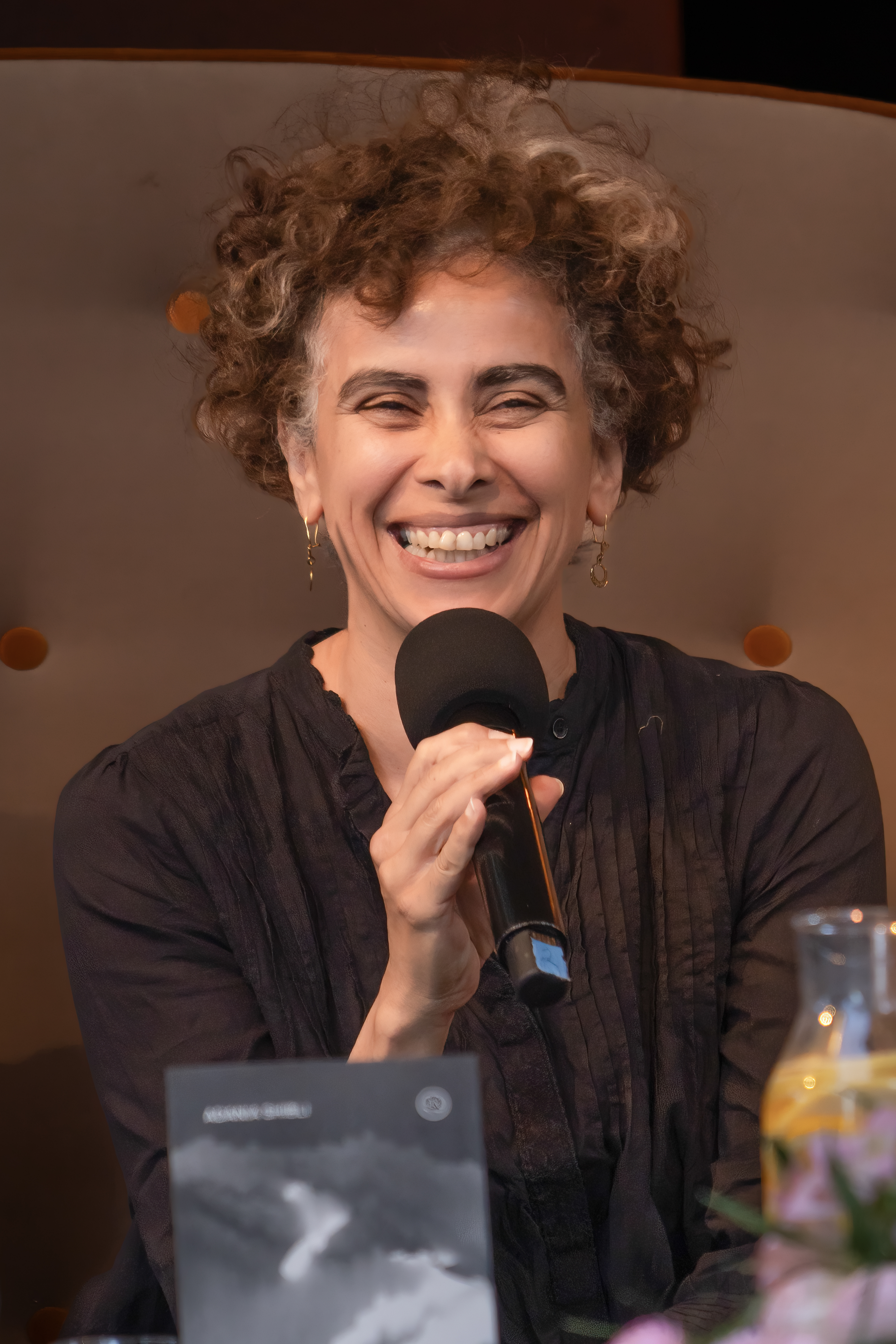
- Shibli during the Literary Heights Festival in 2024
- Born: 1974 (age 51–52); Shibli-Umm al-Ghanam, Upper Galilee, Israel
- Education: University of East London (PhD)
- Occupations: Novelist; essayist; playwright; short story writer; professor
- Writing career
- Language: Arabic
- Notable work: Minor Detail

Adania Shibli (Arabic: عدنية شبلي; born 1974) is a Palestinian author and essayist. She is best known for her 2017 novel Minor Detail, which became the subject of public controversy in Germany following the cancellation of a literary prize for this book, originally scheduled for the 2023 Frankfurt Book Fair.

== Personal life and education ==
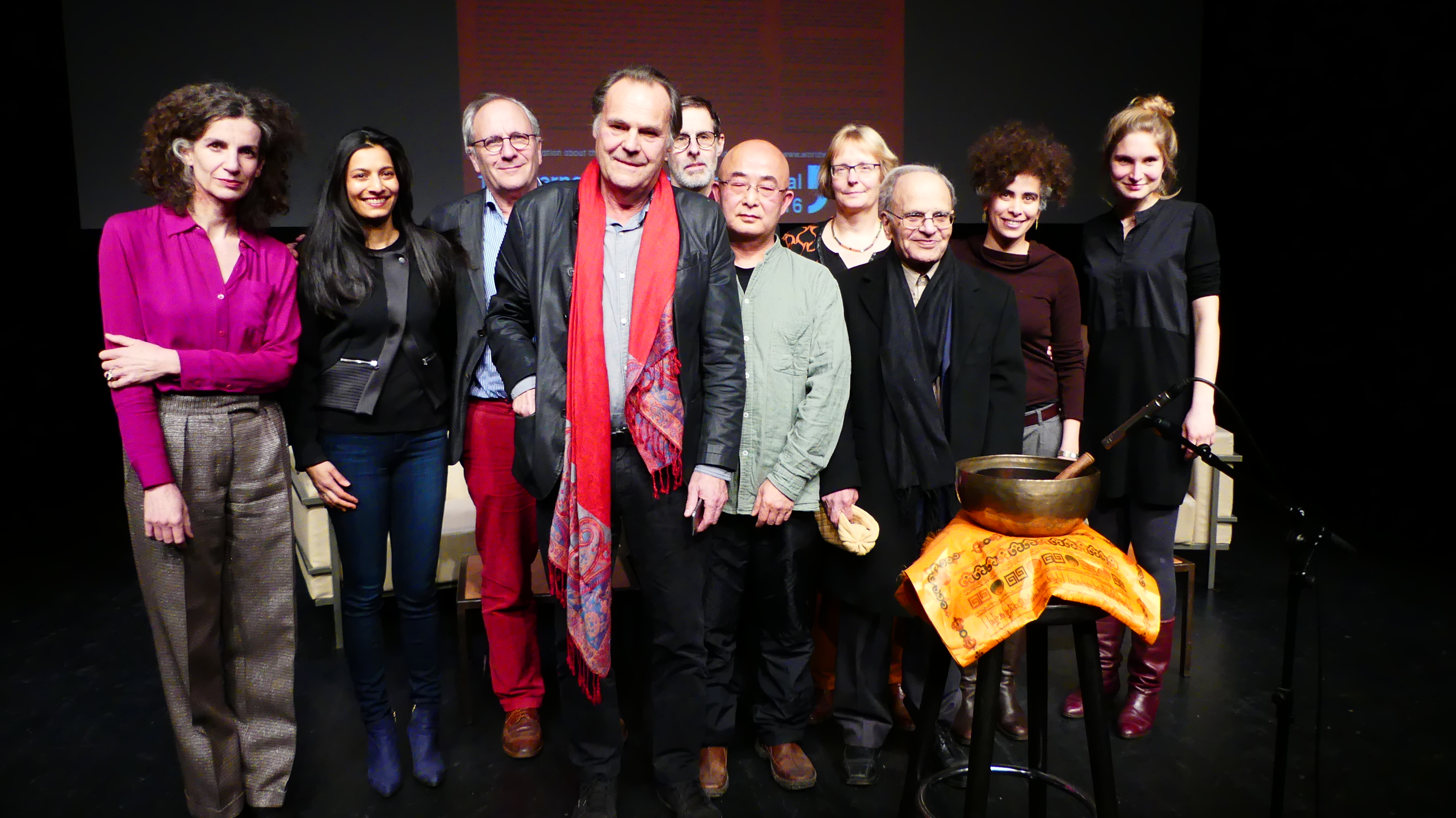
Worldwide Reading for Ashraf Fayadh on 14 January 2016 at Hebbel am Ufer in Berlin. Shibli appears second from the right.

Shibli was born in Shibli-Umm al-Ghanam, Upper Galilee in 1974. She holds a Ph.D. from the University of East London in Media and Cultural Studies. Her dissertation is titled Visual Terror: A Study of the Visual Compositions of the 9/11 Attacks and Major Attacks in the 'War on Terror' by British and French Television Networks. She also completed a postdoctoral fellowship at the EUME research centre of the Institute for Advanced Study in Berlin, Germany. Shibli has taught at the University of Nottingham and since 2013 has worked as a part-time professor at the Department of Philosophy and Cultural Studies at Birzeit University, Palestine.

Shibli and her children split their time between Jerusalem and Berlin. Shibli speaks Arabic, English, Hebrew, French, Korean, and German.

== Writing career ==
Since 1996 Shibli has published in various literary magazines in Europe and the Middle East. She has expanded her work to include novels, plays, short stories and narrative essays, published in several languages in anthologies, art books and literary and cultural magazines.

Her non-fiction works include the art book Dispositions (Ramallah: Qattan) and a collection of essays called A Journey of Ideas Across: In Dialogue with Edward Said (Berlin: HKW). This collection of essays was turned into a symposium curated by Shibli in 2013, which took place at the House of World Cultures in Berlin.

In a December 2020 interview with cultural journalist Claudia Steinberg, Shibli talked about the recently published English translation by Elisabeth Jaquette of her novel Minor Detail, her life in Germany and the unequal relationship between Palestinians and Israelis:

For me, this situation is never about Jewishness. Differences between people are used to commit injustice—that was an early lesson about racism. My parents didn't interfere. They had experienced the Nakba when they were fifteen years old. My grandfather had been killed. There was silence about that. [...] Palestine is a mode of living, an experience. But it's also a position of witnessing, from a position that can teach us. If you are listening, it becomes so natural that you care, and you create a connection of care toward others that is not limited to the borders of the nation-state or to Palestine as such. This is an ethical point for me — what I am as a human being who has lived in this place under these conditions, what I can carry away from this place on a personal level — and what it created in terms of literature.

To this, she added:

I'm against the injustices, the colonization, the occupation, and the humiliation of Palestinians by defining them as others within the Israeli state and Israeli politics and ideologies: I would like that to end. I don’t want a Palestinian state, or a state of Israel — I don’t want either. I don’t want any states, actually. [...] I'm a writer, so I can indulge in fantasies.

== Works ==
- Minor Detail (Originally published as تفصيل ثانوي, Tafṣīl Ṯānawī, 2017), Fitzcarraldo Editions / New Directions, 2020, ISBN 9780811229074
- Keep your eye on the wall: Palestinian landscapes, Saqi Books, London, 2013, ISBN 9780863567599
- We are all equally far from love (Kulluna Ba’id bethat al Miqdar aan el-Hub) (كلنا بعيد بذات المقدار عن الحب), Clockroot Books, Northampton, MA, 2012, ISBN 9781566568630
- Touch (Masaas) (مساس), Clockroot Books, Northampton, MA, 2010, ISBN 9781566568074
- "In Ramallah, on the borders", essay published in the book In Ramallah, Running, edited by Guy Mannes-Abbott and Samar Martha, 2012, ISBN 9781907317675

== Awards ==
Shibli has received the Young Writer’s Award–Palestine by the A. M. Qattan Foundation for her novels Touch in 2001 and We are all equally far from love in 2003. She was named as one of the Beirut39, a group of 39 Arab writers under the age of 40 chosen through a contest organized by Banipal magazine and the Hay Festival. Minor Detail, translated to English by Elisabeth Jaquette, was shortlisted for the 2020 National Book Award for Translated Literature. In 2021, Minor Detail was also longlisted for the International Booker Prize. In August 2024, she received the Leteo award from the city of León, Spain for her novel Minor Detail.

== 2023 Frankfurt Book Fair controversy ==
Shibli's novel Minor Detail, in its German translation by Günther Orth, was selected for the LiBeraturpreis 2023 by the German literary organization LitProm. Based partially on historical facts, the novel recounts the rape and murder of a Palestinian girl in 1949 by Israeli soldiers, who were later convicted of murder (but not rape) by an Israeli court. Originally, the award ceremony at the Frankfurt Book Fair had been announced for 20 October 2023. A few days before the announced date, LitProm canceled the ceremony at the Book Fair and postponed it to an unspecified date in response to protests by German journalists who had said the novel expressed antisemitic attitudes. Further, the ongoing Gaza war was named as another reason for the cancellation. In response to this, the Emirates Publishers Association and the Arab Publishers’ Association withdrew from the Fair, and the publishers of the English translation made the ebook available for free for the duration of the Fair.

On 12 October, the prominent literary critic Iris Radisch spoke out in favor of the awarding of the literary prize in Die Zeit weekly magazine. She referred to the international recognition that the novel has received and that it was also "rightly celebrated as a literary masterpiece" by German literary critics. Further, Radisch wrote that an outstanding literary novel by a Palestinian writer was now being associated with the "current mass murders of Hamas" had nothing to do with serious literary criticism. In his article of 13 October in the Frankfurter Allgemeine Zeitung, literary scholar and journalist Paul Ingendaay referred to an interview with Shibli that he had already conducted in 2022 on the occasion of the German publication of her novel. From this, Ingendaay quotes Shibli's statements as a writer who is interested in the literary representation of topics such as control and fear of a person, thereby enabling the author and reader to gain hidden insights about themselves. In summary, Ingendaay wrote that Shibli condemned any form of nationalism and had spoken out in favor of "perceiving the pain of others." In response to his questions about Shibli's identity as a Palestinian, Ingendaay continued: "In the further conversation, Shibli was wary of political statements and especially of agitation. Instead, she insisted on appreciating her novel Minor Detail — and fiction writing more generally — as a place for thinking about language, place, and identity, which always depends on who is reading it.”

On the other hand, the Tageszeitung newspaper on 11 October quoted journalist Ulrich Noller, who claimed that the novel served antisemitic narratives. The writer Maxim Biller expressed his view in the Süddeutsche Zeitung that "the book ends with the symbolic murder of the frightened Palestinian first-person narrator by a few faceless, nameless, brutal Israeli soldiers, which in the end turns the novel into just an unliterary piece of propaganda".

In November 2023, the Hamburg Regional Court rejected Shibli's demand to prohibit critical statements in the Tageszeitung article about her novel. The court ruled that these statements were covered as an expression of freedom of speech, and decided that literary criticism was entitled to make harsh judgments, since the article referred to the content of the book, not to the author's beliefs. The description of Shibli as a “committed BDS activist” was also not prohibited, as this statement reflected the journalist's judgement and could refer to Shibli's previous activities supporting several artists's boycott of Israel.

Prompted by the announced cancellation of the award, more than 1000 authors and intellectuals, including Colm Tóibín, Ian McEwan, Anne Enright, Hisham Matar, Kamila Shamsie, William Dalrymple as well as Nobel Prize winners Abdulrazak Gurnah, Annie Ernaux and Olga Tokarczuk, criticized the Frankfurt Book Fair and wrote in an open letter that the Book Fair had “a responsibility to be creating spaces for Palestinian writers to share their thoughts, feelings, reflections on literature through these terrible, cruel times, not shutting them down”. In his speech at the fair, philosopher Slavoj Žižek described the fair's decision as "scandalous".
