= Meconah =

Biblical town

Meconah (Mekonah in the King James Version) was a biblical town near Ziklag. It was occupied by the Jews under Nehemiah. It has been equated with Madmannah by Simsons but this is not always agreed with. The present day site is unknown.
