= Alamgir Hashmi =

Anglo-Pakistani poet (born 1951)

- Native name: عالمگیر اورنگزیب ہاشمی
- Born: 15 November 1951 (age 74) Lahore, Pakistan
- Occupation: Poet and writer in English language
- Education: University of Louisville, Kentucky; University of the Punjab
- Notable awards: Rockefeller Fellow
- Spouse: Beatrice Stork

Website
- www.encyclopedia.com/arts/culture-magazines/hashmi-aurangzeb-alamgir

Alamgir Aurangzeb Hashmi (Note: Urdu: عالمگیر اورنگزیب ہاشمی) (born 15 November 1951) is an English language poet and writer of Pakistani origin.

Considered avant-garde, his early and later works were published to considerable critical acclaim. He is widely published in the United Kingdom, Australia, India, Canada, New Zealand and the United States.

== Career ==
He was a practicing transnational humanist and educator in North American, European and Asian universities. He has argued for a "comparative" aesthetic to foster humane cultural norms. He showed and advocated new paths of reading the classical and modern texts and emphasized the sublime nature, position and pleasures of language arts to be shared, rejecting their reduction to social or professional utilities. He has produced many books of seminal literary and critical importance as well as series of lectures and essays (such as "Modern Letters") in the general press.

== Education ==
Hashmi earned an M.A. degree at the University of the Punjab, Lahore (1972) and another M.A. degree at the University of Louisville, Kentucky (1977).

== Poetry ==
- The Oath and Amen: Love Poems. Philadelphia, Dorrance, 1976.
- America Is a Punjabi Word. Lahore, Karakorum Range, 1979.
- An Old Chair. Bristol, Xenia Press, 1979.
- My Second in Kentucky. Lahore, Vision Press, 1981.
- This Time in Lahore. Lahore, Vision Press, 1983.
- Neither This Time/Nor That Place. Lahore, Vision Press, 1984.
- Inland and Other Poems. Islamabad, Gulmohar Press, 1984.
- The Poems of Alamgir Hashmi. Islamabad, National Book Foundation, 1992.
- Sun and Moon and Other Poems. Islamabad, Indus Books, 1992.
- A Choice of Hashmi's Verse. Karachi and New York, Oxford University Press, 1997.

== Literary criticism and scholarly editions ==
- Pakistani Short Stories in English
- Post-independence Voices in South Asian Writings
- The Commonwealth, Comparative Literature and the World
- The Worlds of Muslim Imagination
- Commonwealth Literature: An Essay Towards the Re-definition of a Popular/Counter Culture
- Pakistani Literature: The Contemporary English Writers

== Others ==
- Commonwealth Literature: An Essay Towards the Re-Definition of a Popular/Counter Culture. Lahore, Vision Press, 1983
- The Commonwealth, Comparative Literature and the World. Islamabad, Gulmohar Press, 1988
- Editor, Pakistani Literature: The Contemporary English Writers. New York, World University Service, 2 vols., 1978; revised edition, Islamabad, Gulmohar Press, I vol., 1987
- Editor, with Les Harrop and others, Ezra Pound in Melbourne. Ivanhoe, Australia, Helix, 1983
- Editor, The Worlds of Muslim Imagination. Islamabad, Gulmohar Press, 1986
- Editor, Encyclopedia of Post-Colonial Literatures in English. London, Routledge, 1994
- Member of the 1996 jury for the Neustadt International Prize for Literature (American Literary Award)
- Wild Gods: The Ecstatic in Contemporary Poetry and Prose (New Rivers Press, 2021)

== Awards ==
- The University of the Punjab (Lahore) Scholar, 1970–72, and Certificate of Academic Merit, 1973; first prize
- All-Pakistan Creative Writing Contest, 1972
- Pakistan Academy of Letters, Patras Bokhari award, 1985
- Rockefeller Fellow, 1994
- Roberto Celli Memorial award (Italy), 1994
- D.Litt.: University of Luxembourg, 1984
- San Francisco State University, 1984
