= Horvat Maon (western Negev) =

Archaeological site in Israel

Coordinates: 31°19′44″N 34°24′32″E

Horvat Maʿon (Hebrew) or Tell Maʿin / Khirbet el-Maʿin (Arabic) is an archaeological site located 20 kilometres (12 mi) southwest of Gaza and 1 kilometre (0.62 mi) southeast of Kibbutz Nirim in the Negev, the arid southern portion of Israel. In the Roman period, the site is thought to have formed the western boundary of the Limes Palaestinae.

== Biblical cities named Maon ==
A different Maon (Khirbet Ma'in), southeast of Hebron, near Carmel and Ziph, is mentioned in Joshua 15:55 in the tribal territory of Judah, and not to be confused with Horvat Maon of the Negev. Others have sought to place Horvat Maon of the Negev with Beth-baal-meon (Joshua 13:17) and Beth-meon (Jeremiah 48:23).

== History and archaeology ==
Horvat Maʿon, under the name Menois, was the capital of Saltus Constantinianus, also known as Saltus Constantiniaces, an administrative district formed by either Constantine the Great or Constantius II.

Excavations there have uncovered the Maon Synagogue, known for its mosaics adorned with various animals and likely built around 600 CE. The date of the mosaic has been alternatively given as the first half of the 6th century, based on its style.
