= International Cities of Refuge Network =

International organization for writers in exile

- ICORN's logo.
- Formation: 1993
- Founders: Salman Rushdie, Helge Lunde
- Type: Non-profit
- Executive Director: Helge Lunde
- Website: icorn.org

The International Cities of Refuge Network (ICORN) is an independent organisation of cities and regions which offers shelter to writers, journalists and artists at risk of persecution, with the goal of advancing freedom of expression.

== History ==
It is a successor organization to the Cities of Asylum Network (INCA) established in 1993 by the International Parliament of Writers (IPW) in response to the assassination of writers in Algeria. After the dissolution of IPW in 2003, its activities were continued by the ICORN Administration Center established in Stavanger, Norway, in June 2006 at the Stavanger Cultural Center, Sølvberget. One of the founders was Peter Ripken, who had also been a founding member of the Society for the Promotion of Literature from Africa, Asia, Latin America and the Arab World, later LitProm, in Frankfurt, Germany.

In 2010 ICORN became an independent organization, and in 2014 it voted to expand their support to artists and musicians.

As of 2022, more than 70 cities have agreed to offer this kind of refuge.

Since 2021, ICORN has been part of the Mayor Paweł Adamowicz Award, organised by the European Committee of the Regions. The Award is in honour of the long- serving mayor of Gdansk Paweł Adamowicz who was assassinated in 2019.
