= Burnt Shadows =

2009 novel by Kamila Shamsie

- First edition
- Author: Kamila Shamsie
- Language: English
- Genre: Fiction
- Published: 2009 (Bloomsbury Publishing)
- Publication place: United Kingdom

Burnt Shadows is a 2009 novel by Kamila Shamsie. It was shortlisted for the Orange Prize for Fiction and won the Anisfield-Wolf Book Award for Fiction.

== Plot synopsis ==
In four sections, Burnt Shadows follows the intersecting histories of two families, beginning in the final days of World War II in Japan, following to India on the brink of partition in 1947, to Pakistan in the early 1980s, and then to New York in the aftermath of 9/11 and Afghanistan in the wake of the ensuing US bombing campaign.

In the prologue, an unidentified prisoner finds himself naked in a cell in Guantanamo, wondering: "How did it come to this?" The main story then begins in Nagasaki in 1945, with Hiroko Tanaka, a 21-year-old teacher-turned-munitions worker who is in love with the German Konrad Weiss. Their idyllic romance ends in tragedy, with a fatal flash that leaves Konrad a "burnt shadow" on the ground, and indelibly sears the birds on Hiroko's kimono into the skin of her back. In search of new beginnings, Hiroko travels to Delhi. She stays with Konrad's half-sister, Ilse, now known as Elizabeth, and her husband, James Burton. She begins to learn Urdu with Burton's clerk, Sajjad Ashraf, with whom a relationship blossoms, to the Burtons' disapproval.

With the partition of India, Hiroko's world turns upside down once again, and she finds a new life in newly created Pakistan. In Karachi, Hiroko and Sajjad's son Raza is born. He meets a CIA operative, who is none other than Harry Burton, Ilse and James' son. Ilse has meanwhile reclaimed her Identity, divorced James, and moved to New York. Raza finds himself, naively, swept up into the jihadist movement in Afghanistan. When she loses Sajjad as well, Hiroko moves to New York to be near Ilse. Though the women have not seen each other in decades, they find themselves deeply bound to each other.

Harry has meanwhile extracted Raza from his unsought extremist associations, and instead, offers him a career in the private security/intelligence sector. The parallel convergence of the families in New York and Afghanistan is the foundation from which both tragedy and support arise. Above ground zero, as she once stood over her destroyed home city, Hiroko becomes attached to Harry's daughter Kim, and meets an Afghan taxi driver who becomes a key player in the dramatic events that follow.

== Reception ==
Burnt Shadows was generally well received by critics.

Maya Jaggi, in her review in The Guardian, praises the book as hugely ambitious, Shamsie's voice as "clear and compelling", and admires the use of both Eastern and Western literary references and poetry in Shamsie's style and narratives. She writes: "The identity of the Guantánamo captive remains unclear till the powerful denouement, as events unfold with a malign logic whereby even a man's stooping for a cricket ball can be fatally misconstrued. Any reader anticipating a predictable yarn about the radicalisation of Islamist youth may feel cheated. Far more, I suspect, will feel challenged and enlightened, possibly provoked, and undoubtedly enriched." Writing for the Independent, Charlie Lee Potter says: "The grasp of language, the subtlety of expression and the sheer mastery of international politics are all impressive. And so, too, are the details: family loyalties, national allegiances, betrayals, the sometimes misguided desire we have to protect our children from the truth." Like other reviews, Potter takes on the question of whether the broad strokes of history employed by Shamsie are effective, and he answers with "a resounding, thumping, capitalised YES".

HuffPost reviewer Adrienne Celt finds one weakness in Burnt Shadows: "Shamsie does a beautiful job of building worlds, only to take them away again in a sudden and breathless fashion." She disagrees with Potter, finding that, "At home in implication and poetics, Shamsie is able to make us draw breath at the slightest touch, and as such it's somewhat disappointing that she insists on using so many broad narrative strokes." However, she also opines that "Burnt Shadows does a compelling job of implicating the world in our minute heartbreaks; of teasing out the potential for politics, however distant they may feel, to break into our seemingly self-contained existences and make hash of our plans."

According to the Kirkus review of Burnt Shadows: "Wit, formidable imagination and intricate, well-worked characterizations distinguish the twisty narrative... With a rare combination of skill and sensitivity, Shamsie generates pathos for outsiders and the displaced." The San Francisco Book Review's Susan Gardner writes, "Throughout the sweep of political tides, as relationships and connections are made, get broken, are renewed or severed, the cast of characters expands and are superbly woven in to the fabric of this beautifully written novel. Shamsie is a lyrical writer, with a keen eye for detail and a poignant way of phrasing every-day observations that feel new when she voices them."

== Awards ==
| Year | Award | Category | Result | Ref. |
|---|---|---|---|---|
| 2009 | Orange Prize | — | Finalist | |
| 2010 | Anisfield-Wolf Book Award | Fiction | Won | |
| 2010 | The Morning News Tournament of Books | — | Quarterfinalist | |
| 2011 | International Dublin Literary Award | — | Longlisted | |
