= Frankfurt Book Fair =

World's largest book fair, organized annually in Germany

Coordinates: 50°06′41″N 8°38′54″E

Frankfurter Buchmesse

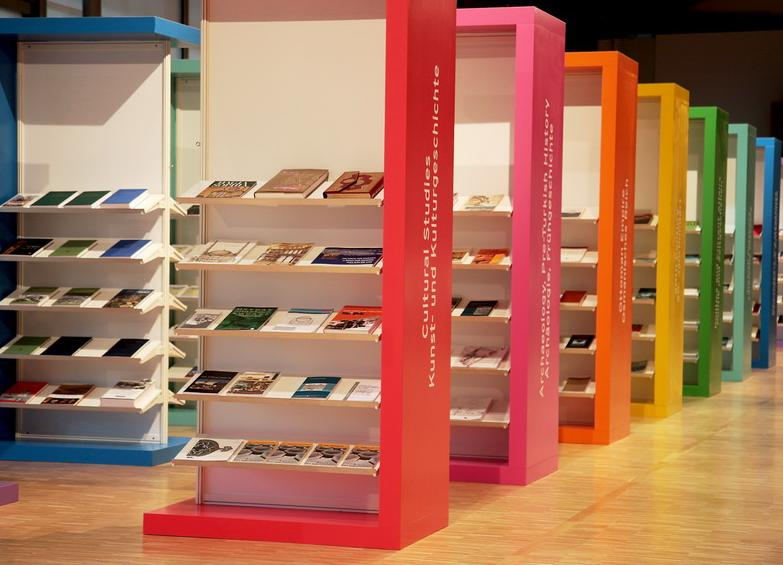
- Exhibition hall in 2008
- Status: Active
- Genre: Multi-genre
- Frequency: Annually, in mid-October
- Venue: Frankfurt Trade Fair grounds
- Location: Frankfurt am Main
- Country: Germany
- Inaugurated: 17th century modern era: 1949
- Attendance: 286,000
- Website: www.buchmesse.de/en

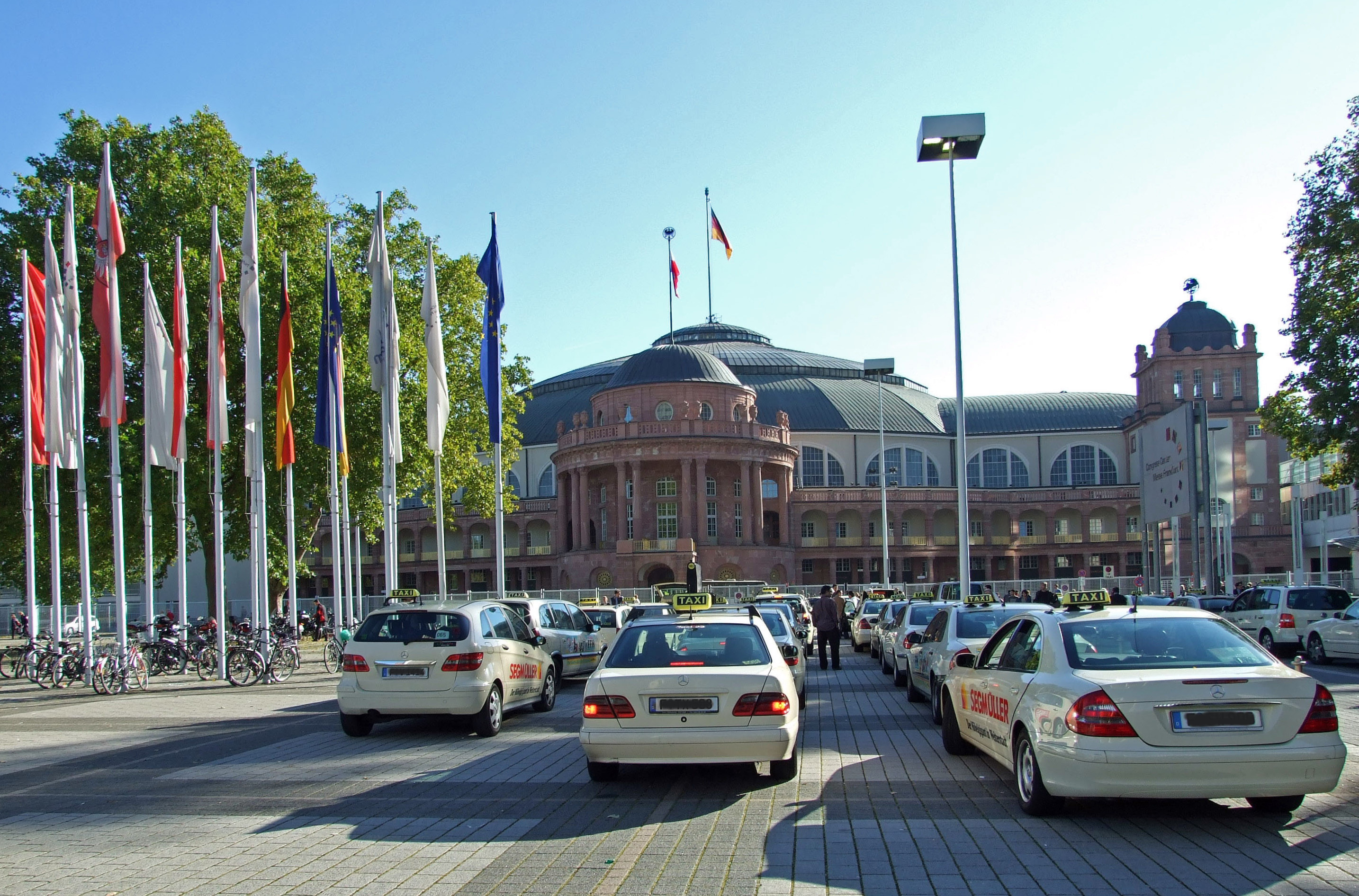
Frontside

The Frankfurt Book Fair (German: Frankfurter Buchmesse, abbr. FBM) is the world's largest trade fair for books, based on the number of publishing companies represented. The five-day annual event in mid-October is held at the Frankfurt Trade Fair grounds in Frankfurt am Main, Germany. The first three days are restricted exclusively to professional visitors; the general public attend the fair on the weekend.

Several thousand exhibitors representing book publishing, multimedia and technology companies, as well as content providers from all over the world gather in order to negotiate international publishing rights and license fees. The fair is organised by Frankfurter Buchmesse GmbH, a subsidiary of the German Publishers and Booksellers Association. More than 7,300 exhibitors from over 100 countries and more than 286,000 visitors took part in the year 2017.

== History ==
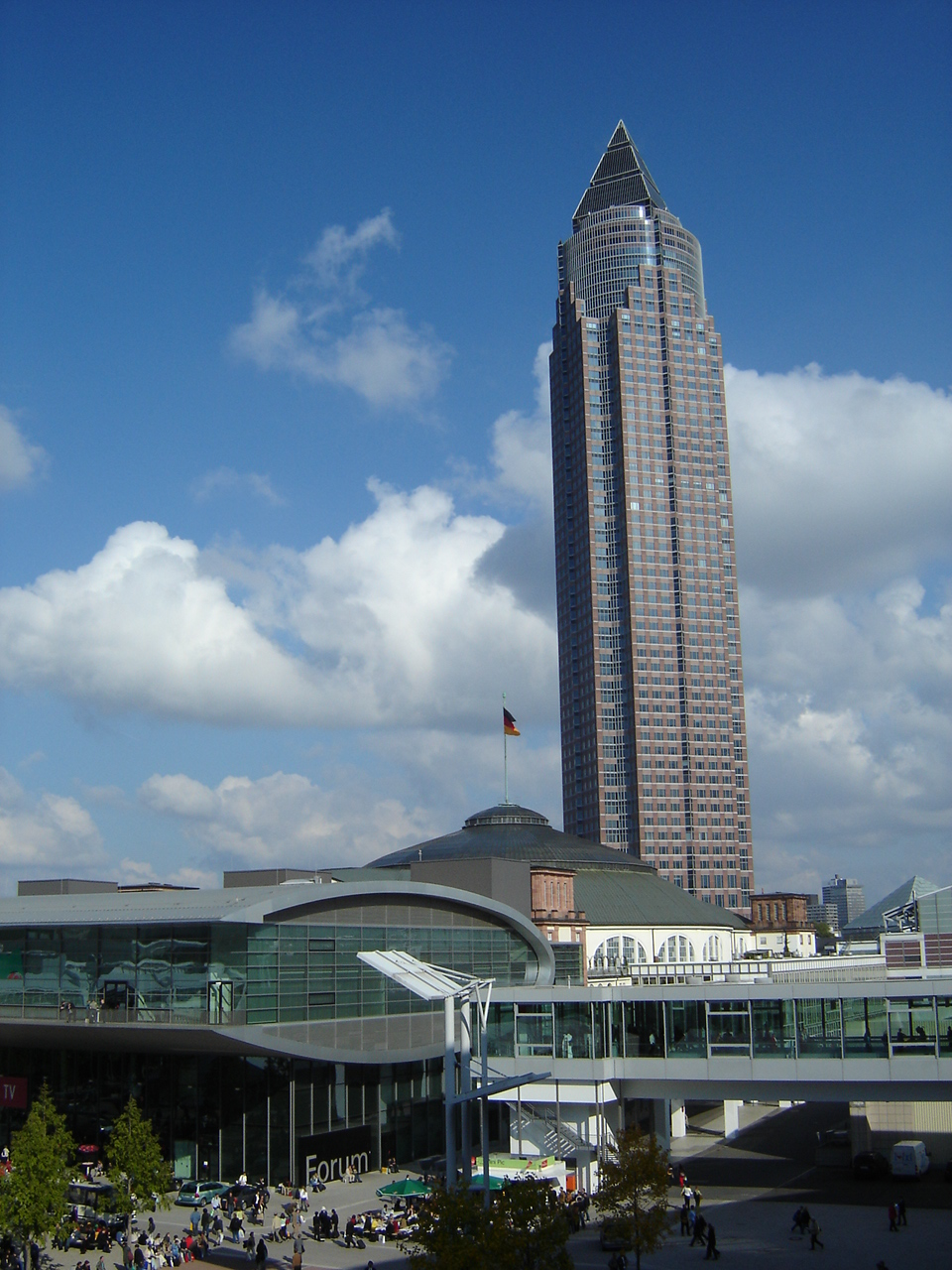
The Frankfurter Buchmesse with the fair's tower (Messeturm, 2004)

The Frankfurt Book Fair has a tradition spanning more than 500 years. Before the advent of printed books, the general trade fair in Frankfurt was the place for selling handwritten books, as early as the 12th century. A printers' and publishers' fair became established sometime in the decades after Johannes Gutenberg developed printing in movable letters in Mainz near Frankfurt; although no official founding date of the Frankfurt Book Fair is documented, it had definitely been established by 1462, the year that the printers Johann Fust and Peter Schöffer, who had taken over Gutenberg's printing operations after a legal dispute, moved their operations to Frankfurt.

The fair became the primary point for book marketing, but also a hub for the diffusion of written texts. In 1520, Martin Luther's pamphlets were widely distributed at the fair, creating widespread support for the Reformation in the region. In the following decades, the fair was attended by merchants testing the market for new books and by scholars looking for newly available scholarship.

Until the end of the 17th century, the Frankfurt Book Fair was the most important book fair in Europe. It was eclipsed in 1632 by the Leipzig Book Fair during the Enlightenment as a consequence of political and cultural developments. After World War II, the first book fair was held again in 1949 at the St. Paul's Church. Since then, it has regained its preeminent position.

== Significance ==
The Frankfurter Buchmesse is the world's largest trade fair for books, based on the number of publishing companies represented. It is considered to be the most important book fair in the world for international deals and trading. It is a critical marketing event for launching books and to facilitate the negotiation of the international sale of rights and licences. Book publishing-, multimedia- and technology companies, as well as content providers from all over the world gather. Publishers, agents, booksellers, librarians, academics, illustrators, service providers, film producers, translators, professional and trade associations, institutions, artists, authors, antiquarians, software and multimedia suppliers all participate in the events. Visitors take the opportunity to obtain information about the publishing market, to network, and to do business.

== Organisation ==
The fair is organised by Frankfurter Buchmesse GmbH, a subsidiary of the German Publishers and Booksellers Association. The five-day annual event in mid-October is held at the Frankfurt Trade Fair grounds in Frankfurt am Main, Germany. The first three days are restricted exclusively to trade visitors; the general public can attend on the weekend, for a fee.

In 2025, 7,800 journalists reported on the fair, which brought together 4,350 exhibitors from 93 countries, and more than 238,000 trade visitors.

== Events and joint ventures ==
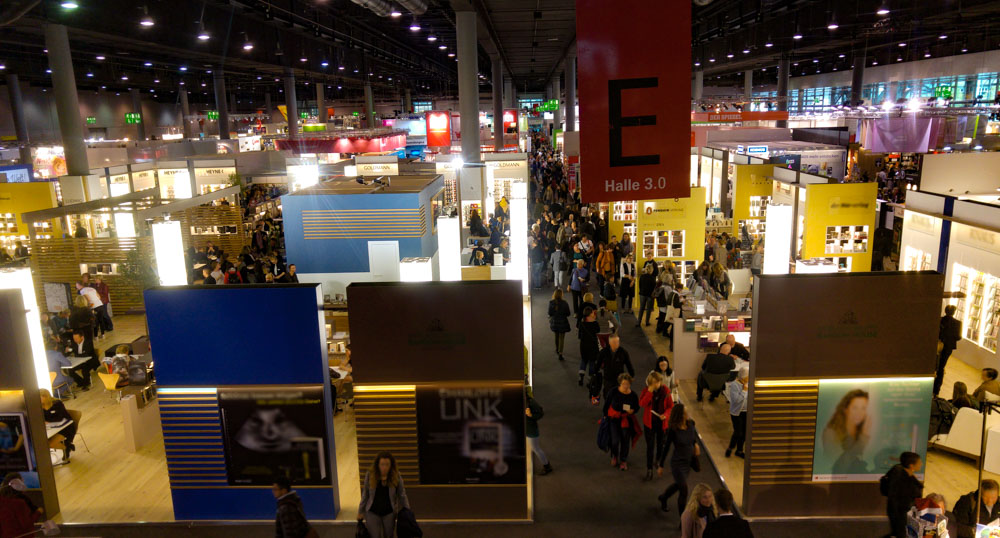
Frankfurt Book Fair in 2016

The Peace Prize of the German Book Trade has been awarded at the fair each year since 1950 during a ceremony in the Frankfurter Paulskirche.

The fair awards the Bookseller/Diagram Prize for Oddest Title of the Year, humoring the book with the oddest title.

Certain initiatives would not exist without the Frankfurter Buchmesse and are closely linked to its goals and, up to a point, management structure.

On the occasion of the 1980 Fair, Litprom was founded – the Society for the Promotion of African, Asian and Latin American Literature. As a non profit association, it monitors literary trends and selects the best examples of creative writing from Africa, Asia and Latin America for translation into German. It promotes them in Germany, Switzerland and Austria by encouraging contacts between authors and publishers from the Third World and those in German-speaking countries. It serves as an information hub and clearing house about literature from Africa, Asia and Latin America, establishing a forum of debate about "Third World" literature.

In 2006, Litcam, a campaign against illiteracy was founded. In this context, the 2007 Frankfurt Book Fair also started a short story project named "Who's on the line? Call for free" by and for people with migration background.

== Guest of honour, focus of interest ==
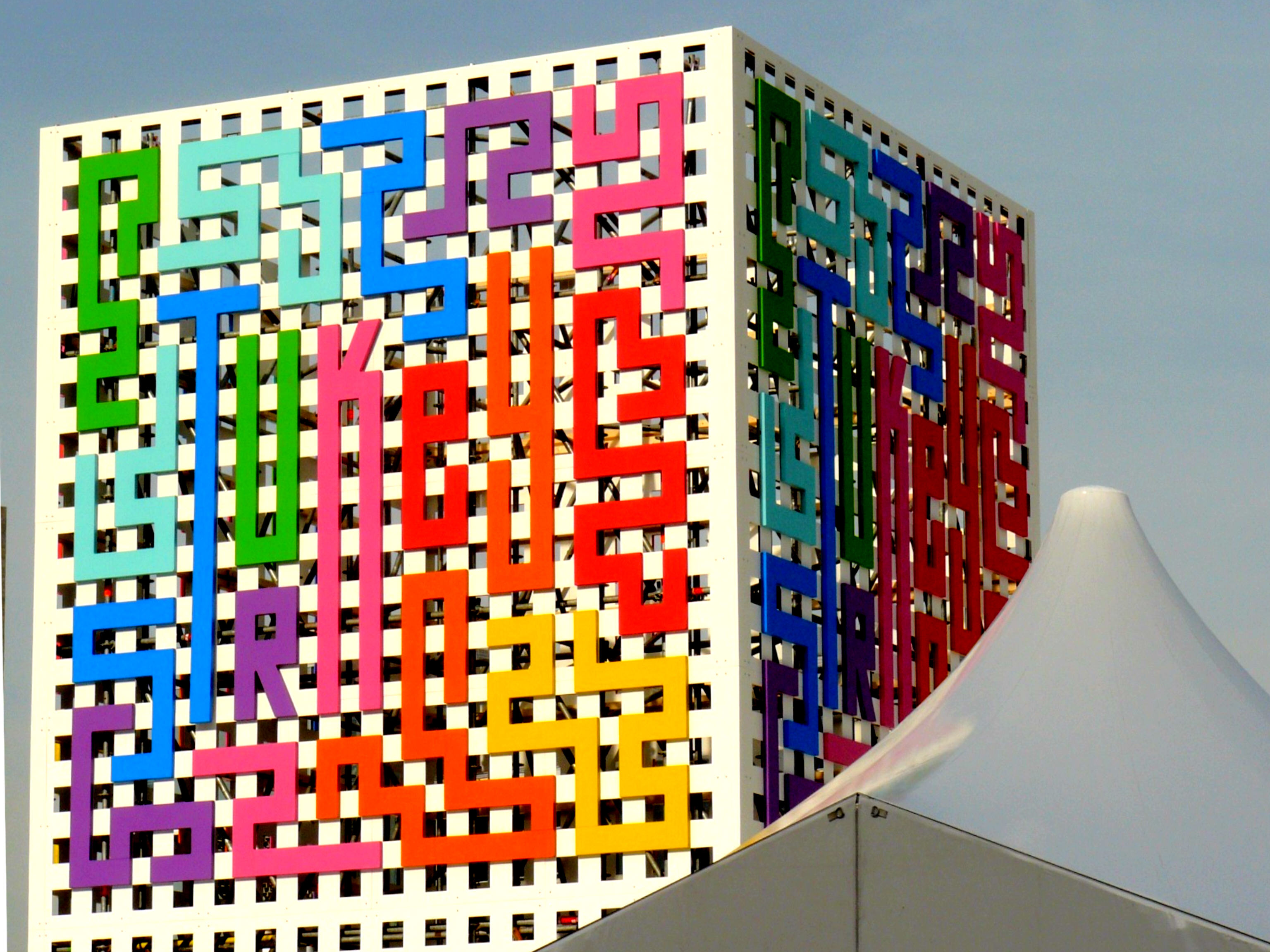
Turkey's Guest of Honour pavilion in 2008

Since 1976, a guest of honour, or a focus of interest is named for the fair. A special literary programme is organised for the occasion (readings, arts exhibitions, public discussion panels, theatre productions, and radio and TV programmes). A special exhibition hall is set up for the guest country, and the major publishing houses are present at the fair. Canada's presentation as 2020 guest of honour was postponed to 2021 due to the COVID-19 pandemic.

Year	Guest of honour	Focus of interest	Motto
1976	Latin America	Latin American literature	
1978	Kind und Buch (Child and book)		
1980	Subsaharan Africa		
1982	Religions		
1984	George Orwell		
1986	India	Indian literature	Wandel in Tradition (Change in tradition)
1988	Italy	Italian literature	Italienisches Tagebuch (Italian diary)
1989	France	French literature	L'Automne français (French autumn)
1990	Japan	Japanese literature	Then and Now
1991	Spain	Spanish literature	La Hora de España (Spain's hour)
1992	Mexico	Mexican literature	Ein offenes Buch (An open book)
1993	Flanders and the Netherlands	Flemish and Dutch literature	Weltoffen (Open-minded)
1994	Brazil	Brazilian literature	Begegnung von Kulturen (Encounter of cultures)
1995	Austria	Austrian literature	
1996	Ireland	Irish literature	Und seine Diaspora (And its diaspora)
1997	Portugal	Portuguese literature	Wege in die Welt (Paths into the world)
1998	Switzerland	Swiss literature	Hoher Himmel – enges Tal (High skies – narrow valleys)
1999	Hungary	Hungarian literature	Unbegrenzt (unlimited)
2000	Poland	Polish literature	©Poland
2001	Greece	Greek literature	Neue Wege nach Ithaka (New ways to Ithaka)
2002	Lithuania	Lithuanian literature	Fortsetzung folgt (To be continued)
2003	Russia	Russian literature	Neue Seiten (New pages/perspectives)
2004	Arab world	Arab literature	Arabische Welt
2005	Korea	Korean literature	Enter Korea
2006	India	Indian literature	Today's India
2007	Catalan countries	Catalan literature	Singular i Universal (Singular and general)
2008	Turkey	Turkish literature	Faszinierend farbig (Fascinatingly colourful)
2009	China	Chinese literature	Tradition & Innovation
2010	Argentina	Argentine literature	Kultur in Bewegung (Culture in motion)
2011	Iceland	Icelandic literature	Sagenhaftes Island (Fabulous Iceland)
2012	New Zealand	New Zealand literature	Bevor es bei euch hell wird (While you were sleeping)
2013	Brazil	Brazilian literature	Ein Land voller Stimmen
2014	Finland	Finnish literature	Finnland. Cool.
2015	Indonesia	Indonesian literature	17.000 Inseln der Imagination (17.000 Islands of Imagination)
2016	Flanders and the Netherlands	Flemish and Dutch literature	Dies ist, was wir teilen (This is what we share)
2017	France	French literature	Francfort en français (Frankfurt in French)
2018	Georgia	Georgian literature	Georgia made by characters
2019	Norway	Norwegian literature	The Dream We Carry (Der Traum in uns)
2020	Canada	Canadian literature	Singular Plurality (Singulier Pluriel)
2021	Canada	Canadian literature	Singular Plurality (Singulier Pluriel)
2022	Spain	Spanish literature	Creatividad Desbordante (Spilling Creativity)
2023	Slovenia	Slovenian literature	Honeycomb of Words (Waben der Worte)
2024	Italy	Italian literature	Verwurzelt in der Zukunft (Rooted in the future)
2025	Philippines	Philippine literature	The imagination peoples the air
2026	Czech Republic	Czech literature	Ein Land an der Küste (A country on the coast)
2027	Chile	Chilean literature	

== Controversy ==
The 2007 fair attracted criticism from both the Spanish and German media. German news magazine Der Spiegel described it as "closed-minded" for its policy of not including the many Catalans who write in Spanish in its definition of Catalan literature. The decision to exclude any element of "Spanishness", defined as literature exclusively done in Spanish, from the fair was made in spite of the fact that the Spanish government contributed more than €6 million towards the cost of the fair.

In 2023 Litprom cancelled the LiBeraturpreis Literature Prize award ceremony for Adania Shibli, a Palestinian author for her novel about the rape and murder of a Palestinian girl in 1949 by Israeli soldiers. In response the Emirates Publishers Association and the Arab Publishers' Association withdrew from the Fair. In the opening ceremony of the book fair, the Slovenian philosopher Slavoj Žižek criticised Litprom and the book fair for this: "Here we are approaching the paradoxes of cancel culture. All that cancel culture does is exclude those who don't fit your [ì.e. the book fair's] notion of inclusion and diversity."

In 2024, critical authors Roberto Saviano and Antonio Scurati are not on the list of 100 Italian authors attending Frankfurt Book Fair where Italy is special guest.

== See also ==
- Peace Prize of the German Book Trade
- German Book Prize
- Books in Germany
