= Nirim =

Kibbutz in southern Israel

Nirim: נִירִים (Hebrew); نيريم (Arabic)
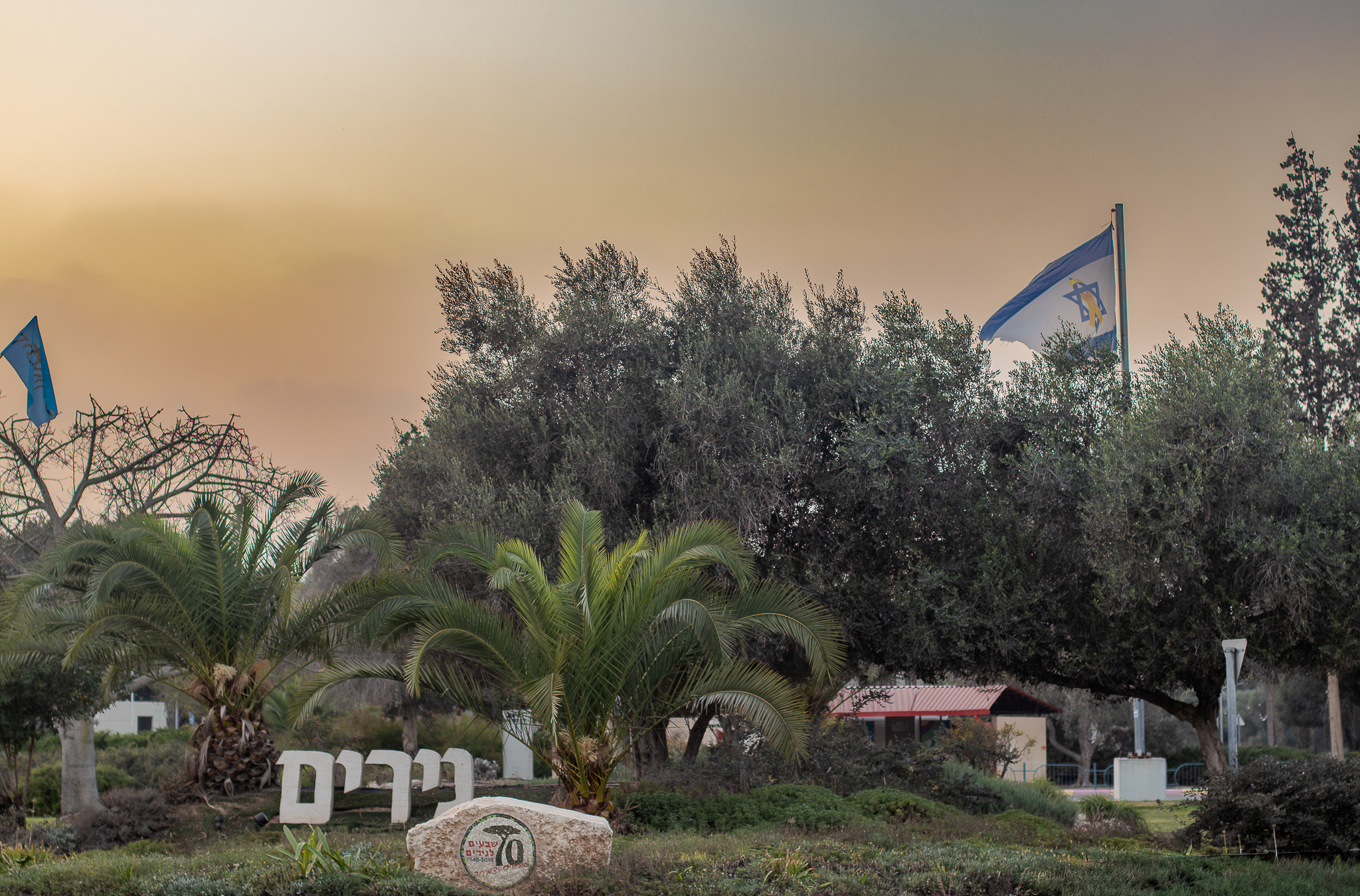

- Location within Northwest Negev region of Israel Location within Israel
- Coordinates: 31°20′6″N 34°23′45″E
- Country: Israel
- District: Southern
- Subdistrict: Beersheba
- Council: Eshkol
- Affiliation: Kibbutz Movement
- Founded: 6 October 1946
- Founder: Hashomer Hatzair members
- Area: 22,000 dunams (22 km^{2}; 8.5 sq mi)
- Population (2024): 472
  - Density: 21/km^{2} (56/sq mi)
- Website: www.nirim.co.il

Nirim (Hebrew: נִירִים, lit. plowed fields) is a kibbutz in the northwestern Negev in Israel. Located roughly 2 kms. (1.2 miles) east of the border with the Gaza Strip, about 7 kilometres (4.3 mi) east of Khan Yunis, it falls under the jurisdiction of Eshkol Regional Council. In 2024 it had a population of 472.

== History ==
The kibbutz was established in October 1946 as part of the 11 points in the Negev plan aimed at establishing a Jewish presence in the Negev in order to claim it as part of a future Jewish state. It was named after the Nir brigade of the Hashomer Hatzair youth movement, some of whose members helped establish the kibbutz, and was originally established on a site called "Dangour", where kibbutz Sufa is now. One of the founders was Dan Zur, who became one of Israel's leading landscape architects.

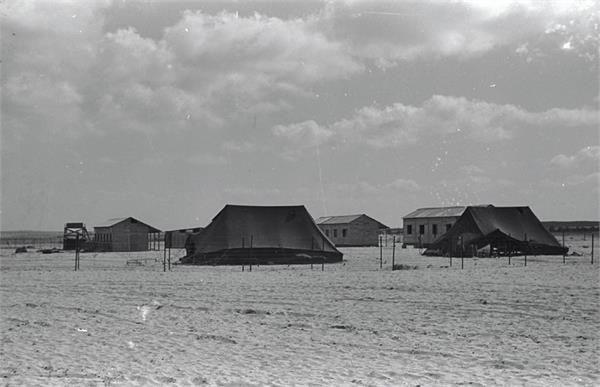
Nirim 1 October 1946

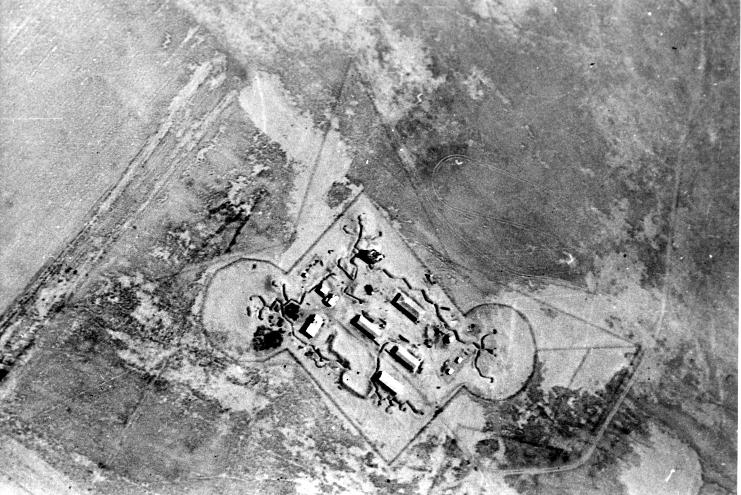
Kibbutz Nirim. Aerial photograph from Palmach archive.

At the outbreak of the 1948 Arab–Israeli War on 15 May 1948, the kibbutz was first Jewish settlement in Israel to be attacked by the Egyptian army, in the Battle of Nirim. It had 39 defenders. During the battle, the Egyptians came within 25 m (82 ft) of the kibbutz perimeter and eight of the kibbutz defenders were killed, before the Egyptians withdrew. All of the houses were destroyed in the attack.

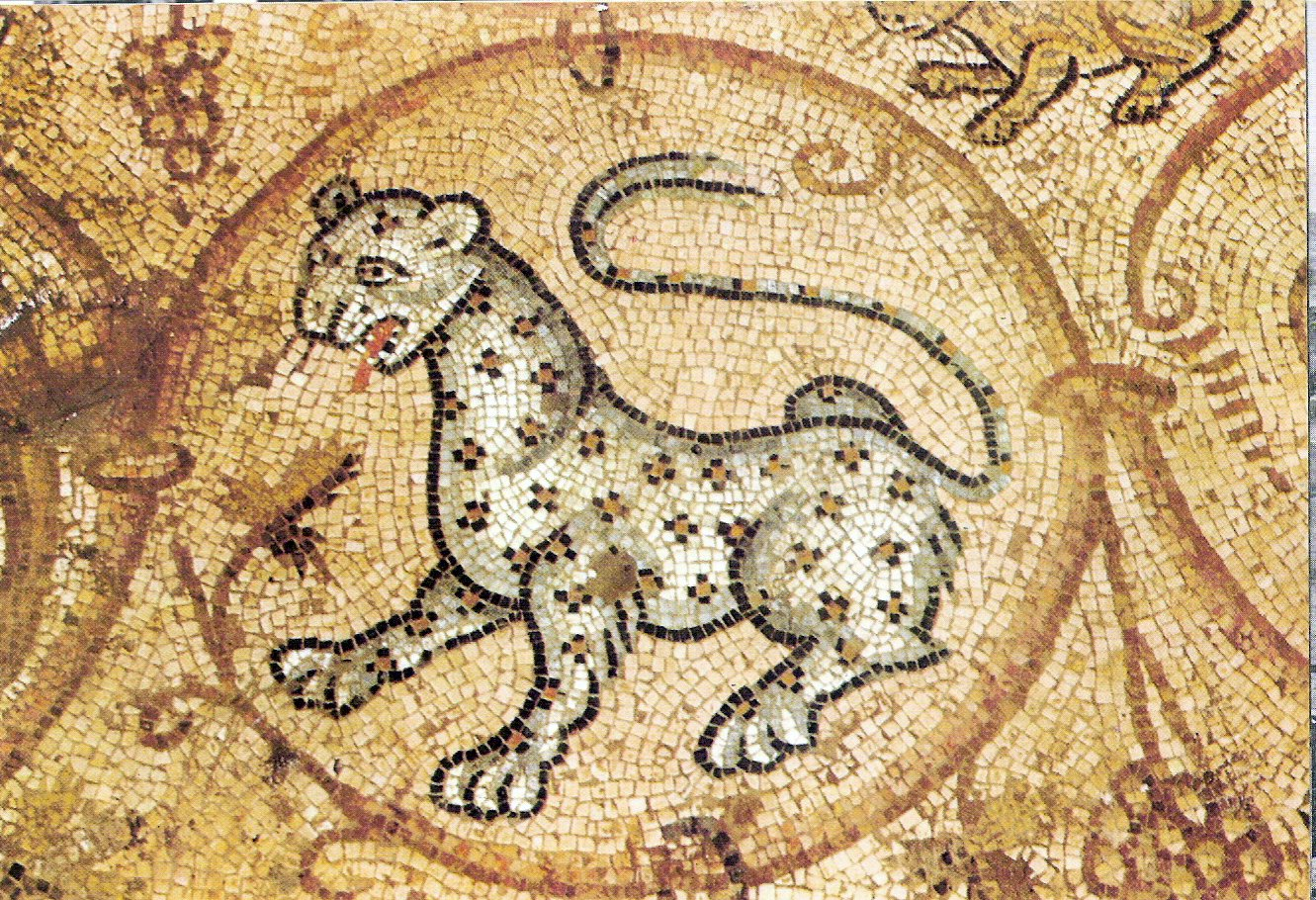
Detail of mosaic floor at the ancient Maon Synagogue, Nirim

Nirim remained an Israel Defense Forces (IDF) outpost against the Egyptian army throughout the war.

As part of the 1948 Palestinian expulsions, the family of Salman Abu Sitta was forcibly expelled from the area, and their land, which was then known as Ma'in Abu Sitta, subsequently used to expand the kibbutz.

After the war, the IDF wanted the original site of Nirim, because of its strategic location, while the kibbutzniks wanted to move north, to the line of 200 mm (7.9 in) of rain a year, so the kibbutz moved some 12 km (7.5 mi) northeast to its present location, next to the site of an ancient synagogue at Horvat Maon.

On 12 August 1949, the IDF troop at Nirim caught an Arab man and a 10-15 year old Bedouin girl. They shot the man, and, following a vote, gang-raped the girl before they killed her and buried her in a shallow grave. This incident came to be known as the Nirim affair. Twenty soldiers who took part in the episode, including the platoon commander, were court-martialed and sent to prison, with 19 of them given light sentences of up to four years. The Israeli appeal court later reduced the sentences of most of the soldiers by half, saying: "At the time there was a general feeling of contempt for the life of Arabs ... and sometimes wanton events occurred in this sphere. All this helped create an atmosphere of 'anything goes'." The murder, rape and trial were then treated as a state secret in order to avoid embarrassment.

During the Mapam split of 1952, Moshe Sneh's supporters were banished from the kibbutz. Until 1956, it was targeted by Fedayeen attacks from the Gaza Strip.

From 2000, Nirim began to be hit by Qassam rockets fired from the Gaza Strip. After Israel's launching of Operation Cast Lead, in January 2009, most of Nirim's members, as well as other villages near the Gaza Strip, were evacuated. Dozens of families from Nirim stayed at kibbutz Mishmar HaEmek in the Jezreel Valley for a month, until the end of the operation.

While kibbutznicks still work in the kibbutz, in the agricultural and social branches, many work outside in professions including education, psychology, academia, engineering, hi-tech, medical, agriculture and more. The kibbutz society maintains an active cultural and social life within their desert setting, which they have made bloom. In 2011 Kibbutz Nirim transformed from being a totally socialistic model to one of the "renewing kibbutz", which preserves the reciprocal support and responsibility ideology.

On August 26, 2014, on the last day of Operation Protective Edge, the head of security, Ze'ev "Ze'evik" Etzion and the assistant head of security Shachar Melamed, were killed in a rocket attack. They were both working with a team of electricians and other kibbutz members, attempting to reinstate the electricity to the community after the high voltage tower that supplied electricity to the whole kibbutz was hit by a rocket earlier the same day. The same rocket attack that killed Ze'evik and Shachar, blew off the legs of Gadi Yarkoni, who was subsequently elected mayor of the Eshkol Regional Council.

=== October 2023 attack ===
Nirim was one of the Israeli villages attacked by Hamas forces in the October 7 attacks. At least five people were killed in the attack and many were injured. Five members of the kibbutz were kidnapped and taken hostage to Gaza, two of which died in captivity. About seven hours after the forces entered the kibbutz, IDF soldiers killed nine Hamas fighters who were still there. The Hamas forces inflicted significant damage upon the kibbutz.

In response, a crowdfunding initiative was initiated to support the kibbutz's restoration, raising over half a million shekels within just a few days.

== Economy ==
Nirim produces organically grown peanuts, sweet potatoes, turnips, carrots, wheat, barley, avocado and other vegetables, and exports them to Europe. The farmers work the land right up to the Gaza Strip barrier. After Israel's disengagement from Gaza in 2005, the Defense Ministry decided to construct a security strip in the area surrounding Gaza, which was to run through Nirim agricultural territory. Nirim was asked to concede NIS 1 million of its compensation funds.
