= Zulfikar Ghose =

American novelist, poet and essayist (1935–2022)

- Born: March 13, 1935; Sialkot, Punjab, British India
- Died: June 30, 2022 (aged 87); Austin, Texas, US
- Education: Keele University
- Occupations: Novelist, poet, essayist
- Spouse: Helena de la Fontaine (m. 1964)
- Relatives: Khwaja Mohammed Ghose (father)

Zulfikar Ghose (March 13, 1935 – June 30, 2022) was a Pakistani-American novelist, poet and essayist. His works are primarily magical realism, blending fantasy and harsh realism.

== Biography ==
Born in Sialkot, Punjab, in British India before Independence and Partition, Ghose grew up as a Muslim. His father, Khwaja Mohammed Ghose, was a businessman. In 1942, during the Second World War, the family moved to Bombay (now Mumbai). After the partition of Undivided India into Pakistan and India, Ghose and his family emigrated to England. He graduated from Keele University in 1959, going on to teach at Ealing Mead School in London. He became a close friend of Anthony Smith, and of British experimental writer B. S. Johnson, with whom he collaborated on several projects. The three writers met when they served as joint editors of an annual anthology of student poets called Universities' Poetry. Ghose also met English poet Ted Hughes and his wife, the American poet and novelist Sylvia Plath, and American author Janet Burroway, with whom he occasionally collaborated. While teaching and writing in London from 1963 to 1969, Ghose also freelanced as a sports journalist, reporting on cricket and hockey for The Observer newspaper. Two collections of his poetry were published, The Loss of India (1964)and Jets From Orange (1967), as were an autobiography called Confessions of a Native-Alien (1965) and his first two novels, The Contradictions (1966) and The Murder of Aziz Khan (1969). The Contradictions explores differences between Western and Eastern attitudes and ways of life. In The Murder of Aziz Khan (1967), his second novel, a small farmer tries to save his traditional land from greedy developers.

In 1964, Ghose married Helena de la Fontaine, an artist from Brazil (a country he later used as the setting for six of his novels). He moved from London to the United States in 1969 to teach at the University of Texas in Austin, where he taught English literature and creative writing until his retirement as professor emeritus in 2007. Ghose became a U.S. citizen in 2004.

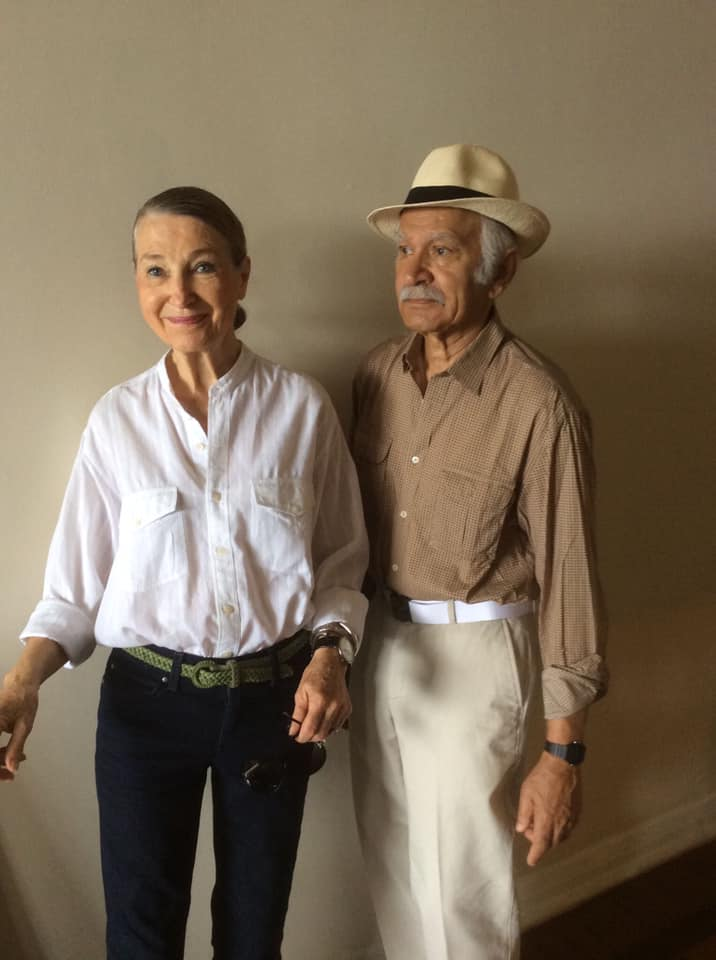
Zulfikar Ghose and Helena de la Fontaine in Rio, 2015

In the 1970s, Ghose gained international repute with his trilogy The Incredible Brazilian, which American writer Thomas Berger called "a picaresque prose epic of Brazilian history." American travel writer and novelist Paul Theroux called the work "a considerable feat of imagination." The trilogy — comprising The Native (1972), The Beautiful Empire (1975), and A Different World (1978) — presents the picaresque adventures, often violent or sexually perverse, of a man who goes through several reincarnations. Ghose's other works include Crump's Terms (1975), Hulme's Investigations into the Bogart Script (1981), A New History of Torments (1982), Don Bueno (1983), Figures of Enchantment (1986), The Triple Mirror of the Self (1992), and Shakespeare's Mortal Knowledge: A Reading of the Tragedies (1993).

Ghose wrote many poems as well as fictional and non-fictional works of prose. His books of poetry include The Violent West (1972), A Memory of Asia (1984) and Selected Poems. He wrote short stories, novels and five books of literary criticism. Ghose's poems, including those in The Loss of India (1964), Selected Poems (1991), and 50 Poems (2010), are often about the travels and memories of a self-aware alien. Beckett's Company (2009) is a collection of personal and literary essays. His work has been translated into many languages.

Largely considered a writer's writer who eschewed commercial literature, Ghose saw style and beauty as the objective of writing and art.

Ghose's correspondence with Berger, spanning 40 years, is housed for research at the Harry Ransom Center at the University of Texas at Austin. The letters cover topics such as their writing projects, books they were reading and personal concerns.

Berger's dystopic 1973 novel Regiment of Women was dedicated to Ghose.

The Zulfikar Ghose Collection at the Harry Ransom Center includes poetry from The Loss of India, Jets from Orange, and other poems and work from that era. It also contains correspondence with Anthony Smith from 1959 to 1992.

In 1963, Ghose received a special award from the E. C. Gregory Trust that was judged by T. S. Eliot, Henry Moore, Herbert Read and Bonamy Dobrée. A year earlier, the Times Literary Supplement featured Ghose as the most prominent poet from the former British colonies by printing three of his poems spread across half a page. In 1989, The Review of Contemporary Fiction published an edition dedicated to Milan Kundera/Zulfikar Ghose. Its editors noted that "Zulfikar Ghose has both ranked with and outranked several of the best English language writers in England and America," and went on to present him as "a unique figure in contemporary literature," whose "evolution across languages and national boundaries" was comparable to Conrad, Nabokov and Beckett.

In his book Zulfikar Ghose: The Lost Son of the Punjab, literature professor Mansoor Abbasi said Ghose remained marginalized among writers accorded a world-class status because his work resists categorization. For Ghose, to use Proust's words, "Quality of language and the beauty of an image are the heart of great writing." According to Abassi, Ghose's writing is full of meditative reverberations and his genius lies in the construction of a language that is lyrical and full of vivid imagery.

Ghose died in Austin, Texas on June 30, 2022, aged 87.

== Bibliography ==
=== Fiction ===
- Statement Against Corpses (1964), short stories, with B. S. Johnson
- The Contradictions (1966)
- The Murder of Aziz Khan (1967)
- The Incredible Brazilian trilogy:
  - The Native (1972), ISBN 0-333-13093-6
  - The Beautiful Empire (1975), ISBN 0-333-13094-4
  - A Different World (1978), ISBN 0-333-13095-2
- Crump's Terms (1975), ISBN 0-333-10744-6
- Hulme's Investigations Into the Bogart Script (1981), ISBN 0-931604-08-7
- A New History of Torments (1982), ISBN 0-09-147670-4
- Don Bueno (1983), ISBN 0-09-154230-8
- Figures of Enchantment (1986), ISBN 0-09-163640-X
- The Triple Mirror of the Self (1992), ISBN 0-7475-1096-2
- Veronica and the Góngora Passion: Stories, Fictions, Tales and One Fable (1998), ISBN 0-920661-70-X
- Kensington Quartet (2020), ISBN 1628972890

=== Nonfiction ===
- Confessions of a Native-Alien (1965), autobiography
- Hamlet, Prufrock and Language (1978), ISBN 0-333-23997-0
- The Fiction of Reality (1983), ISBN 0-333-29093-3
- The Art of Creating Fiction (1991), ISBN 0-333-49019-3
- Shakespeare's Mortal Knowledge: A Reading of the Tragedies (1993), ISBN 0-333-57909-7
- Beckett's Company (2008), Oxford University Press for Pakistan

=== Poetry ===
- The Loss of India (1964)
- Jets from Orange (1967)
- The Violent West (1972), ISBN 0-333-13241-6
- A Memory of Asia (1984), ISBN 0-931604-18-4
- Selected Poems (1991), ISBN 0-19-577388-8
- Geography Lesson (1969)
- bread (2015)

== Video ==
- Zulfikar Ghose - UHV/ABR Reading Series, a talk at the University of Houston's Alcorn Auditorium in April 2009, hosted by the American Book Review.
- Society for Critical Exchange interview on YouTube, at the University of Houston in May 2009.
