= Kamila Shamsie =

Pakistani and British writer and novelist (born 1973)

Kamila Shamsie FRSL
- کاملہ شمسی
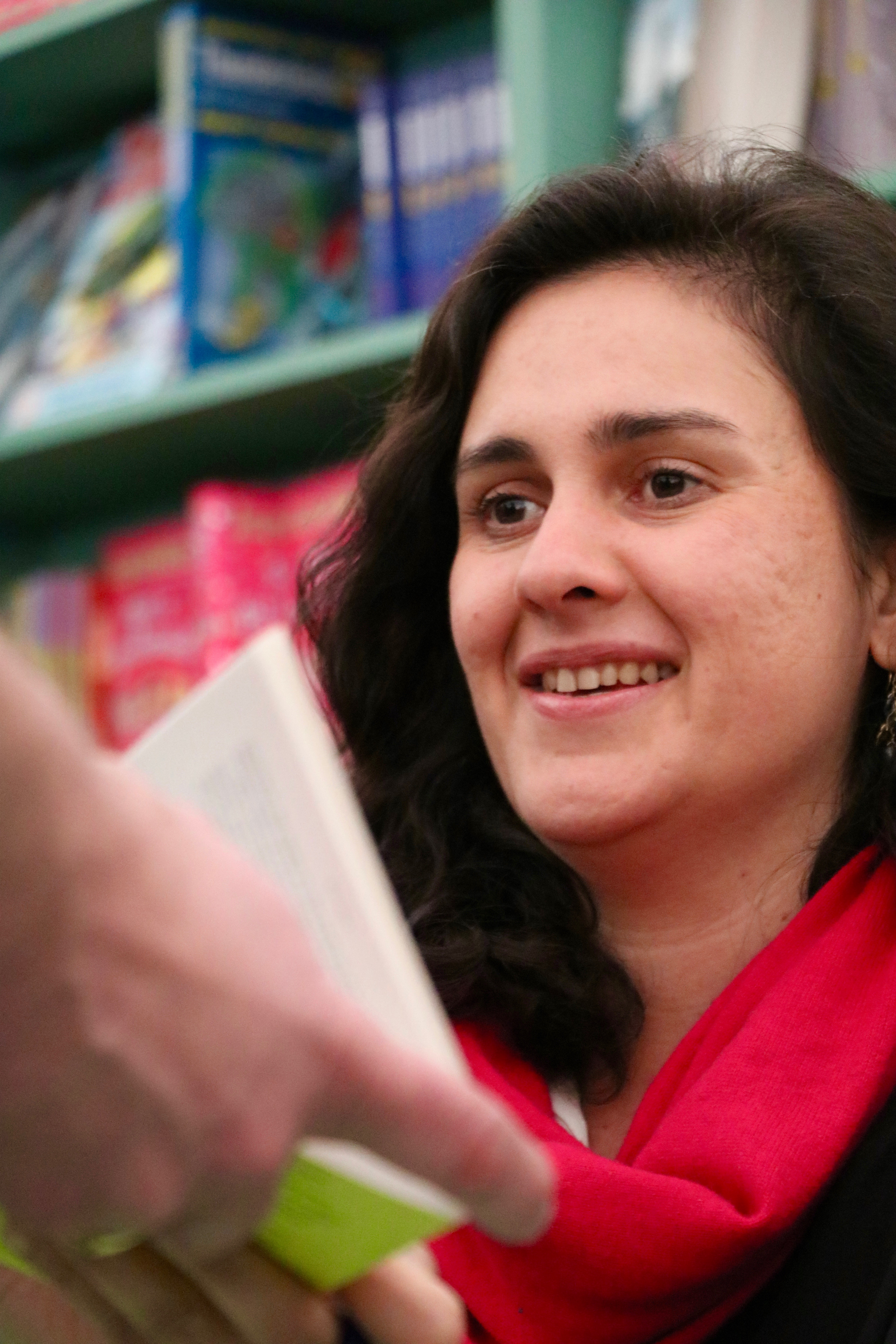
- Shamsie at the 2016 Hay Festival
- Born: 13 August 1973 (age 53); Karachi, Pakistan
- Education: Karachi Grammar School; Hamilton College; University of Massachusetts Amherst
- Occupation: Writer
- Relatives: Muneeza Shamsie (mother); Attia Hosain (great-aunt)
- Writing career
- Genre: Fiction
- Notable works: Burnt Shadows (2009); Home Fire (2017)
- Notable awards: Anisfield-Wolf Book Award for fiction; Women's Prize for Fiction

Kamila Shamsie (Urdu: کاملہ شمسی; born 13 August 1973) is a Pakistani and British writer and novelist who is best known for her award-winning novel Home Fire (2017). Named on Granta magazine's list of 20 best young British writers, Shamsie has been described by The New Indian Express as "a novelist to reckon with and to look forward to." She also writes for publications including The Guardian, New Statesman, Index on Censorship and Prospect, and broadcasts on radio.

== Early life and education ==
Shamsie was born into a well-to-do family of intellectuals in Karachi, Pakistan. Her mother is journalist and editor Muneeza Shamsie, her great-aunt was writer Attia Hosain and she is the granddaughter of memoirist Jahanara Habibullah.

Shamsie was brought up in Karachi, where she attended Karachi Grammar School. She went to the US as a college exchange student, and earned a BA in creative writing from Hamilton College, and an MFA from the MFA Program for Poets & Writers at the University of Massachusetts Amherst, where she was influenced by the Kashmiri poet Agha Shahid Ali.

== Career ==
Shamsie wrote her first novel, In the City by the Sea, while still in college, and it was published in 1998 when she was 25. It was shortlisted for the John Llewellyn Rhys Prize in the UK, and Shamsie received the Prime Minister's Award for Literature in Pakistan in 1999. Her second novel, Salt and Saffron, followed in 2000, after which she was selected as one of Orange's 21 Writers of the 21st century. Her third novel, Kartography (2002), received widespread critical acclaim and was also shortlisted for the John Llewellyn Rhys Prize in the UK. According to the review in Publishers Weekly: "Shamsie's cerebral, playful style sets her apart from most of her fellow subcontinental writers. Something of a cross between Arundhati Roy and Salman Rushdie, she deserves a larger readership in the U.S." Both Kartography and Shamsie's next novel, Broken Verses (2005), have won the Patras Bokhari Award from the Academy of Letters in Pakistan.

Shamsie's fifth novel, Burnt Shadows (2009), was shortlisted for the Orange Prize for Fiction and won an Anisfield-Wolf Book Award for fiction. A God in Every Stone (2014) was shortlisted for the 2015 Walter Scott Prize and for the Baileys Women's Prize For Fiction. According to Maya Jaggi's review in The Guardian: "Through its succession of seemingly disparate, acutely observed worlds, Burnt Shadows reveals the impact of shared histories, hinting at larger tragedies through individual loss." Shamsie's seventh novel, Home Fire, described by the BBC as a "powerful story of the complexities of love, family and state in wartime", was longlisted for the 2017 Booker Prize, shortlisted for the International Dublin Literary Award, and in 2018 won the Women's Prize for Fiction.

She is also the author of the non-fiction work Offence: The Muslim Case (Seagull Books, 2009). In 2009, Shamsie donated the short story "The Desert Torso" to Oxfam's Ox-Tales project – four collections of UK stories written by 38 authors. Her story was published in the Air collection. She attended the 2011 Jaipur Literature Festival, where she spoke about her style of writing. She participated in the Bush Theatre's 2011 project Sixty-Six Books, with a piece based on a book of the King James Bible.

Shamsie was elected a Fellow of the Royal Society of Literature in 2011. In 2013, she was included in the Granta list of 20 best young British writers.

She has contributed to such international events as the Cleveland Humanities Festival and the NGC Bocas Lit Fest in Trinidad, in 2016, and is a patron of the Manchester Literature Festival. In 2017, she joined the Manchester Centre for New Writing, where she is Professor of Creative Writing.

She delivered the 2018 Orwell Lecture at University College London, with the title "Unbecoming British: citizenship, migration and the transformation of rights into privileges".

In 2021, Shamsie was a judge for the Goldsmiths Prize, alongside Nell Stevens, Fred D'Aguiar and Johanna Thomas-Corr.

== Personal life ==
Shamsie states that she considers herself Muslim. She moved to London in 2007 and is now a dual national of the UK and Pakistan.

In 2012, she joined the latest incarnation of the Authors XI cricket team, despite never having played the game before. She contributed a chapter, "The Women's XI", to the book The Authors XI: A Season of English Cricket from Hackney to Hambledon (2013), collectively written by members of the team to chronicle their first season together.

== Awards and recognition ==
=== Recognition ===
- 1999: Prime Minister's Award for Literature in Pakistan, for In the City by the Sea
- 2002: Patras Bokhari Award from the Academy of Letters in Pakistan
- 2005: Patras Bokhari Award, for Broken Verses
- 2013: Recognized as one of the BBC's 100 women.
- 2013: Named on Granta Best of Young British Novelists
- 2019: Nelly Sachs Prize, in honour of her literary work (rescinded, no new winner nominated); however, the jury withdrew its decision to award the writer citing her support for the pro-Palestinian Boycott, Divestment and Sanctions (BDS) movement. A letter protesting the move was signed by hundreds of fellow writers in support of Shamsie.

=== Literary awards ===
Year	Work	Award	Category	Result	Ref.
2009	Burnt Shadows	Orange Prize for Fiction	—	Shortlisted	
2010	Burnt Shadows	Anisfield-Wolf Book Award	Fiction	Won	
2010	Burnt Shadows	The Morning News Tournament of Books	—	Quarterfinalist	
2011	Burnt Shadows	International Dublin Literary Award	—	Longlisted	
2015	A God in Every Stone	Baileys Women's Prize for Fiction	—	Shortlisted	
2015	A God in Every Stone	DSC Prize for South Asian Literature	—	Shortlisted	
2015	A God in Every Stone	Walter Scott Prize	—	Shortlisted	
2017	Home Fire	Costa Book Awards	Novel	Shortlisted	
2017	Home Fire	Man Booker Prize	—	Longlisted	
2018	Home Fire	Australian Book Industry Awards	International Book	Shortlisted	
2018	Home Fire	Books Are My Bag Readers' Awards	Fiction	Shortlisted	
2018	Home Fire	DSC Prize for South Asian Literature	—	Shortlisted	
2018	Home Fire	Women's Prize for Fiction	—	Won	
2019	Home Fire	Europese Literatuurprijs	—	Longlisted	
2019	Home Fire	International Dublin Literary Award	—	Shortlisted	

== Books ==
- In the City by the Sea (1998), ISBN 9780140281811
- Salt and Saffron (2000), ISBN 9781582342610
- Kartography (2002), ISBN 9780156029735
- Broken Verses (2005), ISBN 9780156030533
- Offence: The Muslim Case (2009), ISBN 9781906497033
- Burnt Shadows (2009), ISBN 9780312551872
- A God in Every Stone (2014), ISBN 9781408847206
- Home Fire (2017), ISBN 9781408886779
- Duckling: A Fairy Tale Revolution (2020), ISBN 9781784876319
- Best of Friends (2022), ISBN 9781526647696

== See also ==
- List of people who support the BDS movement
