= Shakti Bhatt Prize =

Literary award in India

Shakti Bhatt First Book Prize
- Awarded for the first book published an author in India
- Country: India
- Presented by: Shakti Bhatt Foundation
- Reward: ₹200,000
- Established: 2007
- First award: 2008
- Final award: 2025

The Shakti Bhatt Prize is a literary award established in 2007 in memory of Indian publisher, Shakti Bhatt. Between 2008 and 2019, it was awarded for first books published in India by an author of any age in the genres of poetry, fiction, creative non-fiction and drama. From 2020 onward, the Prize has been awarded in recognition of a writer's body of work, instead of a first book. The last award will be given in 2025 to Zara Chowdhary for her memoir The Lucky Ones.

== Establishment ==
The Shakti Bhatt First Book Prize was established by an eponymous foundation in memory of Shakti Bhatt, an Indian publisher. Bhatt, the editor of Indian publishing house, Bracket Books, died following an illness in 2007. The Shakti Bhatt Foundation was established in her memory by her husband, Indian poet Jeet Thayil, along other friends and family; the foundation funds and manages the award.

The prize was first awarded in 2008 to Mohammad Hanif for his novel, A Case of Exploding Mangoes. In 2020, the new Shakti Bhatt Prize was awarded to incarcerated scholars and writers Anand Teltumbde and Gautam Navlakha.

In May 2021, the Foundation announced that there would be no prize for 2021, and instead donated the prize money towards relief efforts relating to the COVID-19 pandemic in India. In 2025, it was announced that the award will be discontinued from next year.

== Eligibility and Criteria ==
Between 2008 and 2019, the Award was open to nominations of first books published during the previous year in the Indian subcontinent within the categories of fiction, non-fiction, poetry, and drama. Eligible books were either written in English, or translated into English from other languages. Publications from vanity presses were excluded.

In 2020, Thayil announced that the Prize would now be awarded to recognize a writer's body of work, rather than a first book. Speaking about the changes, Thayil stated, "It just seems to us that at this point (in 2020) it does not make sense to have a first book prize. When we started nobody was doing it. In time, first books came up in many shortlists. In fact, there were copycats for just first books prize as well. We just did not see the relevance. So, we wanted to give it to somebody where it will make a difference."

The Award initially carried a cash prize of ₹100,000 (equivalent to ₹130,000 or US$1,400 in 2026). In 2014, the prize amount was increased to ₹200,000.

== Awards ==
=== 2008–2019 ===
| Year | Jury | Shortlist | Winner |
|---|---|---|---|
| 2008 | William Dalrymple Kamila Shamsie Samit Basu | David Devadas, In Search of a Future: The Story of Kashmir; Amruta Patil, Kari; Sridala Swami, A Reluctant Survivor; Namita Devidayal, The White Room; Aravind Adiga, White Tiger; Mohammad Hanif, A Case of Exploding Mangoes; Pallavi Aiyar, An Experience of China | Mohammad Hanif, A Case of Exploding Mangoes |
| 2009 | Rana Dasgupta Mukund Padmanabhan Arshia Sattar | Chandrahas Choudhury, Arzee the Dwarf; Parismita Singh, Hotel at the End of the World, Palash Krishna Mehrotra, Eunuch Park, (Penguin); Mimlu Sen, Baulsphere, Anuradha Roy, An Atlas of Impossible Longing; Mridula Koshy, If It is Sweet | Mridula Koshy, If It is Sweet |
| 2010 | Mahesh Dattani Kalpana Swaminathan Ruchir Joshi. | HM Naqvi, Homeboy; Mohyna Srinivasan, House on Mall Road; Fatima Bhutto, Songs of Blood and Sword: A Daughter's Memoir; Ali Sethi, The Wish Maker; Vishwajyoti Ghosh, Delhi Calm; Samanth Subramaniam, Following Fish | Samanth Subramaniam, Following Fish |
| 2011 | Sarnath Banerjee Jai Arjun Singh Palash Mehrotra | Aman Sethi, A Free Man; A. Revathi, The Truth About Me; Mirza Waheed, The Collaborator; Jamil Ahmad, The Wandering Falcon; Anirudha Bhattacharjee & Balaji Vittal, R. D. Burman: The Man The Music; Shehan Karunatilaka, Chinaman: The Legend of Pradeep Mathew | Jamil Ahmad, The Wandering Falcon |
| 2012 | David Godwin Tishani Doshi Basharat Peer | Navneet Jagannatha, Tamasha in Bandargaon; Priyamvada N. Purushotham, The Purple Line; Sudha Shah, The King in Exile; Taj Hassan, The Inexplicable Unhappiness of Ramu Hajjam; Naresh Fernandes, Taj Mahal Foxtrot: The Story of Bombay's Jazz Age; Bunny Suraiya, Calcutta Exile | Naresh Fernandes, Taj Mahal Foxtrot: The Story of Bombay's Jazz Age |
| 2013 | Meena Kandasamy Sunil Khilnani Niven Govinden | Janice Pariat, Boats on Land; Akash Kapur, India Becoming; Chetan Raj Shreshta, The King’s Harvest; Nilanjana Roy,The Wildings; Sonora Jha, Foreign; Aranyani, A Pleasant Kind of Heavy and Other Stories | Nilanjana Roy,The Wildings |
| 2014 | Amit Chaudhuri Aatish Taseer Mridula Koshy | Deepti Kapoor, A Bad Character; Bilal Tanweer, The Scatter Here Is Too Great; Prawin Adhikari, The Vanishing Act; Supriya Dravid, A Cool, Dark Place; Shovon Chowdhury, The Competent Authority; Mahesh Rao, The Smoke Is Rising | Bilal Tanweer, The Scatter Here Is Too Great |
| 2015 | Samhita Arni Mohammed Hanif Krys Lee | Indra Das, The Devourers; Saskya Jain, Fire Under Ash; Raghu Karnad, The Farthest Field; Rohini Mohan, The Seasons of Trouble; Bharath Murthy, The Vanished Path; Shahid Siddiqui, The Golden Pigeon | Rohini Mohan, The Seasons of Trouble |
| 2016 | Samanth Subramaniam Mahesh Rao Janice Pariat | Manu S Pillai, The Ivory Throne; Madhu Gurung, The Keeper of Memories; Sophia Khan, Yasmeen; Nisid Hajari, Midnight’s Furies; Kanishk Tharoor, Swimmer Among the Stars; Akshaya Mukul, The Gita Press and the Making of Hindu India | Akshaya Mukul, The Gita Press and the Making of Hindu India |
| 2017 | Kamila Shamsie Rohini Mohan Margaret Mascarenhas | Anuk Arudpragasam,The Story of a Brief Marriage; Prayaag Akbar, Leila; Hirsh Sawhney, South Haven; Sumana Roy, How I Became a Tree; Tripti Lahiri, Maid In India; Tejaswini Apte-Rahm, These Circuses that Sweep Through the Landscape | Anuk Arudpragasam,The Story of a Brief Marriage |
| 2018 | Githa Hariharan Sampurna Chattarji Raghu Karnad | Preti Taneja, We That Are Young; Deepak Unnikrishnan,Temporary People; Aanchal Malhotra, Remnants of a Separation; Sanam Maher, The Sensational Life and Death of Qandeel Baloch, Shreevatsa Nevatia, How to Travel Light; Sujatha Gidla, Ants Among Elephants: An Untouchable Family and the Making of Modern India | Sujatha Gidla, Ants Among Elephants: An Untouchable Family and the Making of Modern India |
| 2019 | Sonia Faleiro Prayaag Akbar Ruskin Bond | Numair Atif Choudhury, Babu Bangladeshi; Priyanka Dubey, No Nation for Women; Nadia Akbar, Goodbye Freddie Mercury; Tony Joseph, Early Indians: The Story of Our Ancestors and Where We Came; Roshan Ali, Ib’s Endless Search for Satisfaction | Tony Joseph, Early Indians: The Story of Our Ancestors and Where We Came |

=== 2020–2025 ===
| Year | Honorees |
|---|---|
| 2020 | Gautam Navlakha, Anand Teltumbde |
| 2021 | No prize awarded: prize funds were donated to relief efforts relating to the COVID-19 pandemic in India. |
| 2022 | Manoranjan Byapari |
| 2024 | Kynpham Sing Nongkynrih, for his body of work. |
| 2025 | Zara Chowdhary, The Lucky Ones (memoir) |
