= PEN/John Kenneth Galbraith Award for Nonfiction =

American literary award

The PEN/John Kenneth Galbraith Award for Nonfiction is awarded by PEN America (formerly PEN American Center) biennially "to a distinguished book of general nonfiction possessing notable literary merit and critical perspective and illuminating important contemporary issues which have been published in the United States during the previous two calendar years. It is intended that the winning book possess the qualities of intellectual rigor, perspicuity of expression, and stylistic elegance conspicuous in the writings of author and economist John Kenneth Galbraith, whose four dozen books and countless other publications continue to provide an important and incisive commentary on the American social, intellectual and political scene."

The winner receives $10,000.

The award is one of many PEN awards sponsored by International PEN affiliates in over 145 PEN centres around the world. The PEN American Center awards have been characterized as being among the "major" American literary prizes.

== Honorees ==
Award winners, runner-ups, and finalists
Year	Author	Title	Publisher	Result	Ref.
2007	James Carroll	House of War: The Pentagon and the Disastrous Rise of American Power	Mariner Books	Won	
2007	Gene Roberts and Hank Klibanoff	The Race Beat: The Press, the Civil Rights Struggle, and the Awakening of a Nation	Knopf	Runner-up	
2007	Thomas E. Ricks	Fiasco: The American Military Adventure in Iraq	Penguin Press	Runner-up	
2009	Steve Coll	The Bin Ladens: An Arabian Family in the American Century	Penguin Group)	Won	
2009	Jeffrey Meyers	Samuel Johnson: The Struggle	Basic Books	Runner-up	
2009	Stanley Plumly	Posthumous Keats: A Personal Biography	W.W. Norton & Co.	Runner-up	
2011	Robert Perkinson	Texas Tough: The Rise of America's Prison Empire	Picador	Won	
2011	John W. Dower	Cultures of War: Pearl Harbor / Hiroshima / 9-11 / Iraq	W.W. Norton & Co.	Runner-up	
2011	Isabel Wilkerson	The Warmth of Other Suns	Random House	Runner-up	
2013	Katherine Boo	Behind the Beautiful Forevers: Life, Death, and Hope in a Mumbai Undercity	Random House	Won	
2013	Donovan Hohn	Moby-Duck	Penguin Books	Runner-up	
2013	Anne Applebaum	Iron Curtain	Doubleday	Finalist	
2013	Victoria Sweet	God's Hotel: A Doctor, a Hospital, and a Pilgrimage to the Heart of Medicine	Riverhead Books	Finalist	
2015	Sheri Fink	Five Days at Memorial: Life and Death in a Storm-Ravaged Hospital	Crown	Won	
2015	Danielle Allen	Our Declaration	Liveright	Finalist	
2015	Mark Fainaru-Wada and Steve Fainaru	League of Denial	Crown Archetype	Finalist	
2015	Jonathan M. Katz	The Big Truck That Went By	Palgrave Macmillan	Finalist	
2015	Naomi Klein	This Changes Everything	Simon & Schuster	Finalist	
2017	Matthew Desmond	Evicted: Poverty and Profit in the American City	Crown	Won	
2019	Bernice Yeung	In a Day's Work: The Fight to End Sexual Violence Against America’s Most Vulnerable Workers	Crown	Won	
2021	Saidiya Hartman	Wayward Lives, Beautiful Experiments: Intimate Histories of Riotous Black Girls, Troublesome Women, and Queer Radicals	W. W. Norton & Company	Won	
2022	Tiya Miles	All That She Carried: The Journey of Ashley's Sack, a Black Family Keepsake	Random House	Won	
2022	Andrea Elliott	Invisible Child: Poverty, Survival & Hope in an American City	Random House	Finalist	
2022	Reuben Jonathan Miller	Halfway Home: Race, Punishment, and the Afterlife of Mass Incarceration	Little Brown and Company	Finalist	
2022	Sarah Schulman	Let the Record Show: A Political History of ACT UP New York, 1987-1993	Farrar, Straus and Giroux	Finalist	
2022	Clint Smith	How the Word Is Passed: A Reckoning with the History of Slavery Across America	Little Brown and Company	Finalist	
2023	Eve Fairbanks	The Inheritors: An Intimate Portrait of South Africa’s Racial Reckoning	Simon & Schuster	Won	
2023	Kelly Lytle Hernández	Bad Mexicans: Race, Empire, and Revolution in the Borderlands	W. W. Norton & Company	Finalist	
2023	Imani Perry	South to America: A Journey Below the Mason-Dixon to Understand the Soul of a Nation	HarperCollins Publishers	Finalist	
2023	Martin Sixsmith	The War of Nerves: Inside the Cold War Mind	Pegasus Books	Finalist	
2023	Javier Zamora	Solito: A Memoir	Hogarth Press	Finalist	
2024	Saket Soni	The Great Escape: A True Story of Forced Labor and Immigrant Dreams in America	Algonquin Books	Won	
2024	Roxanna Asgarian	We Were Once a Family: A Story of Love, Death, and Child Removal in America	Farrar, Straus and Giroux	Finalist	
2024	Siddharth Kara	Cobalt Red: How the Blood of the Congo Powers Our Lives	St. Martin's Press	Finalist	
2024	Tobias Rose-Stockwell	Outrage Machine: How Tech Amplifies Discontent, Disrupts Democracy—And What We Can Do About It	Legacy Lit	Finalist	
2024	John Vaillant	Fire Weather: A True Story from a Hotter World	Alfred A. Knopf	Finalist	
2025	Ana Raquel Minian	In the Shadow of Liberty: The Invisible History of Immigrant Detention in the United States		Won	
2025	Zara Chowdhary	The Lucky Ones: A Memoir	Crown	Finalist	
2025	Steve Coll	The Achilles Trap: Saddam Hussein, the C.I.A., and the Origins of America’s Invasion of Iraq	Penguin Press	Finalist	
2025	Jesse Katz	The Rent Collectors: Exploitation, Murder, and Redemption in Immigrant LA	Astra House	Finalist	
2026	Peter Beinart	Being Jewish After the Destruction of Gaza: A Reckoning	Knopf	Finalist	
2026	Jeanne Carstensen	A Greek Tragedy: One Day, a Deadly Shipwreck, and the Human Cost of the Refugee Crisis	Atria Publishing Group	Finalist	
2026	Siddharth Kara	The Zorg: A Tale of Greed and Murder That Inspired the Abolition of Slavery	St. Martin's Press	Finalist	
2026	Joseph Lee	Nothing More of This Land: Community, Power, and the Search for Indigenous Identity	Atria Publishing Group	Finalist	
2026	Julian Brave NoiseCat	We Survived the Night	Knopf	Finalist	
