= Koshy =

Koshy is an Indian Saint Thomas Christian name, and is Syriac Malayalam for the biblical name Joshua. Notable people with the name include:

- Elizabeth Koshy, Indian sport shooter
- J B Koshy (born 1947), Indian judge
- Koshy Koshy (1825–1899), Indian Anglican priest and Malayalam novelist
- Liza Koshy (born 1996), American actress and YouTube personality
- Mridula Koshy (born 1969), Indian writer
- Ninan Koshy (1934–2015), Indian political thinker
- Vinitha Koshy, Malayalam film actress
- Hannah Reji Koshy, Malayalam film actress and model
