= Women in the Sri Lankan Civil War =

The Sri Lankan civil war between 1983 and 2009 had a significant impact on women.

== Background ==
The Sri Lankan civil war was a civil war fought in Sri Lanka between 1983 and 2009. The war principally opposed the Sinhalese-dominated Government of Sri Lanka against the Liberation Tigers of Tamil Eelam (LTTE), an internationally designated terrorist group that aimed to create an independent Tamil state called Tamil Eelam in northern Sri Lanka. Sparked by the Black July anti-Tamil pogrom in 1983, the war would end with the Sri Lankan government victorious after a 2009 offensive that militarily defeated the LTTE. Between 1987 and 1990, the Indian government was also involved in the conflict, through the Indian Peace Keeping Force.

== In the LTTE ==
A significant number of women fought with the Liberation Tigers of Tamil Eelam (LTTE) during the Sri Lankan Civil War, constituting 20-to-30% of LTTE combattants over the course of the war. According to Kara Joyce of Georgetown University, the LTTE "were unique in many ways, one of which being their inclusion of women in combat roles during the Sri Lankan Civil War," saying that the LTTE "included women in all aspects of their organization, from combat to naval expeditions to logistics." According to journalists Kim Wall and Mansi Choksi, the LTTE "boasted the world's fiercest army of women, even as Tamil society imposed a culture of subservience. In the early years of the war, women were assigned roles in recruitment, propaganda, medical care, and fundraising. But slowly, women made up a large contingent of commandants, especially in suicide squads."

According to Reed Wood of the University of Essex and Lindsey Allemang of the University of Iowa, the "combination of a permissive gender ideology and acute resource pressures contributed to the large-scale recruitment of female combatants" by the LTTE.

Malathi was the first female LTTE fighter to die during the war, being killed in action in 1987 in a battle with the Indian Peace Keeping Force. A brigade of the LTTE was later named after her, the Malathi Brigade. Maria Vasanthi Michael, known under the nom de guerre Major Sothiya, commanded the first women-only unit of the LTTE, the Sothiya Brigade, formed in 1989. The Gonagala massacre in 1999, where 54 civilian villagers were murdered by the LTTE, gained notoriety for being perpetrated by a mostly female LTTE force.

Women also participated in the LTTE Black Tigers suicide attacks, including the Assassination of Rajiv Gandhi, carried out by Kalaivani Rajaratnam. According to Josh Roose of the Australian Catholic University, the LTTE "are widely credited with mainstreaming the use of the suicide vest as a force multiplier," instilling "an increased sense of horror and terror among the wider population that anyone—man or woman—might be the next bomber."

== In the Sri Lankan military ==
In February 1998, the Sri Lanka Air Force reported that it had received over 800 applications from women to enlist to fly transport planes in the war zone after launching its first recruitment advertising campaign aimed at women.

== Aftermath ==
Post-war, many women who fought with the LTTE faced difficulties in transitioning to civilian life, particularly as they were often expected to occupy less equal roles than they had as combatants.

Around half of the HALO Trust staff working on demining operations in Sri Lanka are women.

== In popular culture ==
=== Literature ===
Journalist Rohini Mohan 2014 non-fiction book The Seasons of Trouble includes the story of a female combattant in the LTTE.

V. V. Ganeshananthan's 2023 novel Brotherless Night follows the coming-of-age story of a teenage girl who wishes to become a doctor but gets swept up in the civil war.

=== Film ===
In 1998, Indian director Santosh Sivan released the film The Terrorist, based on LTTE suicide bomber Kalaivani Rajaratnam.

== See also ==
- Women in Sri Lanka
