= The Generation of Rage in Kashmir =

- Author: David Devadas
- Language: English
- Genre: Non-fiction
- Published: 2018
- Publisher: Oxford University Press
- Publication place: India
- ISBN: 9781439109113

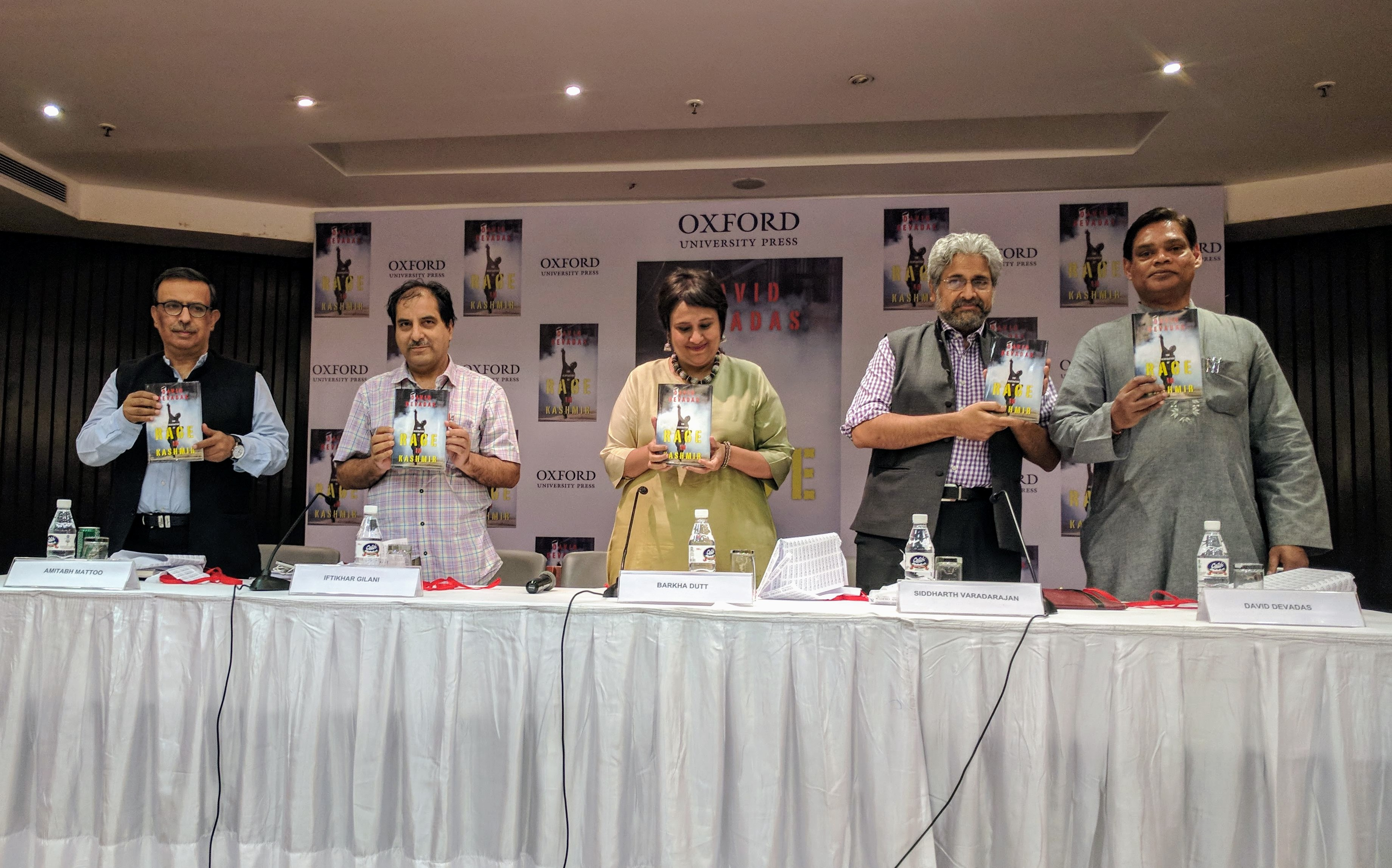
Book Launch of "The Generation of Rage" by David Devadas (extreme right). Also in picture, Barkha Dutt, Siddarth Varadarajan, Amitabh Mattoo and Iftikhar Gilani.

The Generation of Rage in Kashmir is a book written by the Indian journalist and author David Devadas, a former political editor at Business Standard. The book examines the rise of militancy in Kashmir and looks at the causes of anger among Kashmiri youth following the killing of Burhan Wani in 2016.

== Reviews ==
Praising the book, Kallol Bhattacherjee in The Hindu wrote that Devadas had produced a "great work".
