= Bilal Tanweer =

Pakistani writer and translator

- بلال تنویر
- Born: 1983 (age 42–43); Karachi, Pakistan
- Education: Columbia University
- Occupations: Writer and Translator
- Writing career
- Notable work: The Scatter Here Is Too Great (2013)
- Notable awards: Shakti Bhatt First Book Prize (2014)

Bilal Tanweer (Urdu, Punjabi: بلال تنویر; born 1983) is a Pakistani writer and translator from Lahore. His novel The Scatter Here Is Too Great was awarded the Shakti Bhatt First Book Prize in 2014, and was shortlisted for the DSC Prize for South Asian Literature and the Chautauqua Prize in 2015. He received the PEN Translation Fund Grant for his translation of Muhammad Khalid Akhtar's novel Chakiwara Mein Visaal.

== Early life ==
Tanweer was born in 1983 in Karachi, Pakistan. He earned his Master of Fine Arts degree from Columbia University and received a Fulbright Scholarship. He presently resides in Lahore, Pakistan and works as an associate professor at the Lahore University of Management Sciences (LUMS). He is a mentor and organiser of LUMS Young Writers Workshop for young writers in Pakistan.

== Works ==
His writing has appeared in various newspapers and magazines including The New York Times, Dawn, Granta, Vallum, Critical Muslim, The Caravan and Words Without Borders. His novel, The Scatter Here is Too Great, was published in India by Random House in 2013. It depicts the event of a bombing at a railway station in Karachi. The story has been told from the perspective of witnesses, victims, family members, friends, associates, and lovers. It was published in the UK by Jonathan Cape in 2014, and in the US by HarperCollins the same year. Its French version (Le monde n'a pas de fin) was published by Editions Stock in 2014, It was published in Germany by Hanser Verlag in 2016.

== Honours ==
- Shakti Bhatt First Book Prize in 2014.
- Shortlisted for the DSC Prize for South Asian Literature in 2015.
- Shortlisted for the Chautauqua Prize in 2015.
- PEN Translation Fund Grant.
- Selected as a Fellow of Akademie Schloss Solitude for 2015–2017.

== Publication ==
- The Scatter Here Is Too Great (2013)

=== Translation ===
- The House of Fear (2010) by Ibn-e-Safi
- Love in Chakiwara and Other Misadventures (2016) by Muhammad Khalid Akhtar
