= Bangladesh International Tutorial =

Location
- Road-1A Sector-14, Uttara, Dhaka; Bangladesh
- Coordinates: 23.8670°N 90.3835°E

Information
- Type: English-Medium school
- Motto: To serve the nation
- Established: 1983
- Director: Ms. Anika Rahman

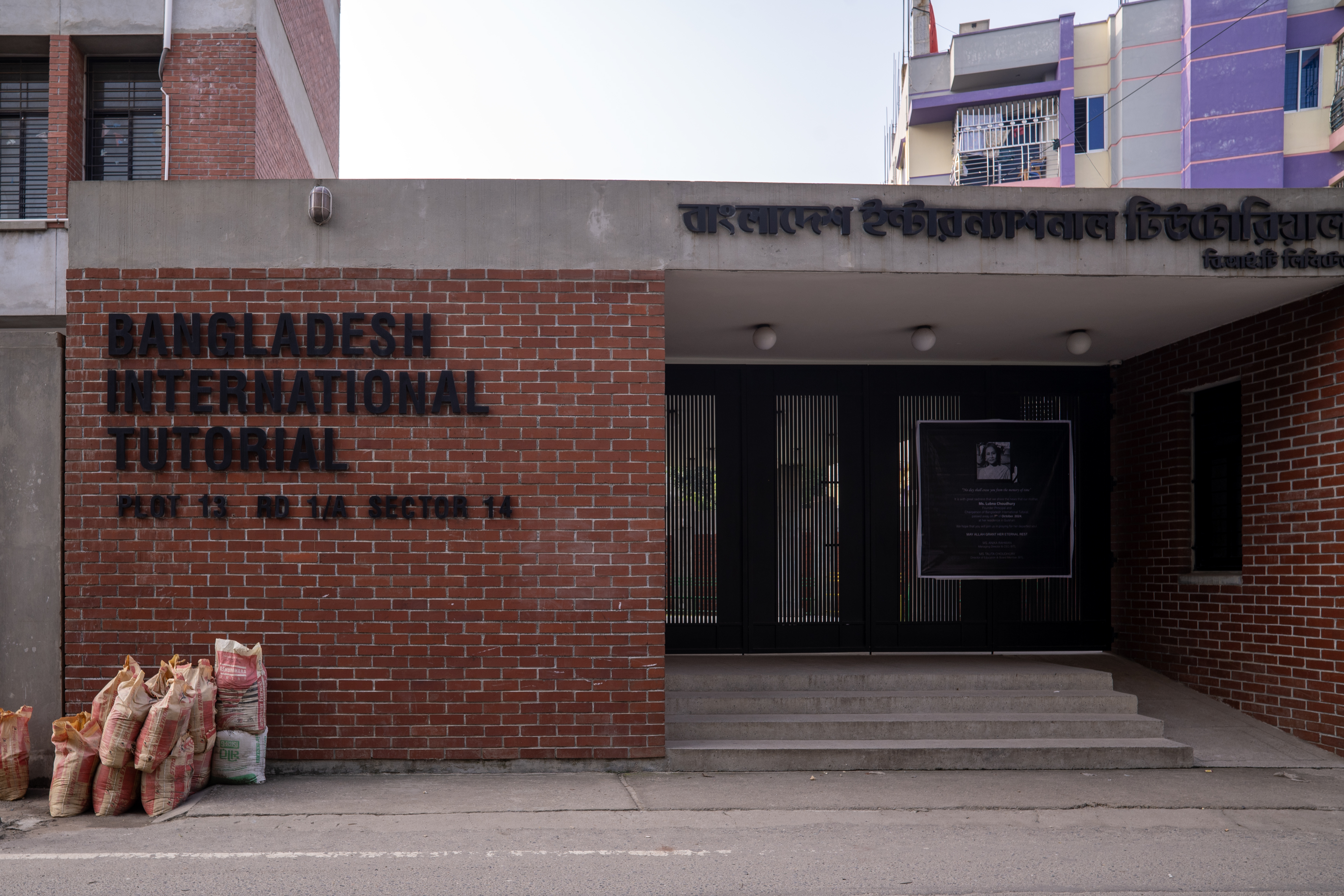

Bangladesh International Tutorial, abbreviated as BIT, is a private English-medium education school in Dhaka, Bangladesh. Established in 1983, it is run in accordance with the London Board for the Ordinary (O-level) and Advanced Level (A-level) examinations. Bangladesh International Tutorial organised a graduation ceremony for the GCE ordinary and advanced level classes at the Red Brick School (which is no longer present) at Uttara in the city.

== Curriculum ==
In 2010, 48 BIT students won bronze or silver (editable) Duke of Edinburgh's Awards. Two BIT students placed among the top 63 achievers worldwide on the O- and A-level examinations in 2012.

== Notable alumni ==
- Zafar Sobhan
- Numair Atif Choudhury

== See also ==
- List of schools in Bangladesh
