= The Purple Line =

2012 debut novel by Priyamvada N. Purushotham

First edition

The Purple Line is the debut novel of the Indian author Priyamvada N. Purushotham. It was published by HarperCollins India in 2012 and was shortlisted for the Shakti Bhatt First Book Prize in 2012.

Set in Chennai, India, at the turn of the century, it is the tale of a gynaecologist who unearths the stories of six unlikely patients whose lives are intertwined without them knowing it. It deals with some of the gender issues facing the women of India today, including female foeticide and infanticide, and is considered by many to be an audacious exploration of womanhood.
