= Peace Has Come =

2018 short story collection by Parismita Singh

- Author: Parismita Singh
- Illustrator: Parismita Singh
- Genre: Fiction
- Set in: Bodoland
- Publisher: Westland Books
- Publication date: 2018
- ISBN: 9789386850508

Peace Has Come is a collection of short stories written and illustrated by Parismita Singh, published by Westland in 2018.

== Synopsis ==
There are eight stories in the collection that take place in the Bodoland region of Assam, India, during a time of "ceasefire". The stories feature characters from a variety of communities, including Bodo, Nepali, Bengali, Koch-Rajbongshi, Rabha, Muslim and Santal.

== Background ==
In 2018, Singh told The Hindu that she wrote the stories over three years while working on another project related to primary schools in Assam.

== Reception ==
In a review for Mint, Sanjukta Sharma writes "The title of Parismita Singh’s collection of stories, Peace Has Come, is a tragicomic irony." Supriya Sharma writes in a review for the Hindustan Times, "The irony of the title [...] becomes evident in its absence in the lives of the characters of these short stories set in the villages of upper Assam (the area called Bodoland). [...] Surprisingly, its subject matter does not weigh down this collection or make it a depressing read." In a review for The Sunday Guardian, Anshika Ravi writes, "The brilliance of her work lies in the lingering feeling of dissatisfaction and restlessness that she manages to instill. All stories end on an ambiguously tragic note, only ascertaining that peace is nowhere near."

Abdullah Khan writes in a review for The Hindu, "The plotlines are often predictable. But Singh’s uniqueness lies in the way she carves out her characters, looking deep into their heart and minds, so that readers immediately empathise with them." Jessica Xalxo writes for SheThePeople, "With Singh’s illustrations too marking the pages, readers find themselves experiencing what the newspapers glossed over and what only a look into the lives of the people amidst ceasefire could give." In a review for Scroll.in, Sayali Palekar writes, "Peace Has Come, I believe, is crucial to read today, as more and more people realise how violent peace can be, to realise the sheer impossibility of these three titular words." A review by Kamalika Basu in The Telegraph concludes, "With tension continuing to brew in Assam, the book is particularly relevant to our times. Rather than taking a partisan stand on militancy, Singh represents diverse ethnic groups that inhabit the space, and ties them together through the shared struggle for rights and identity and an undercurrent of humanity."
