= Nilanjana Roy =

Indian journalist, literary critic, editor, and author

- Born: Kolkata
- Education: St. Stephen's College
- Occupations: Columnist, author
- Spouse: Devangshu Datta
- Writing career
- Genres: Book reviews, fiction, nonfiction
- Notable works: The Wildings, The Hundred Names of Darkness, The Girl Who Ate Books
- Notable awards: 2013 Shakti Bhatt First Book Prize

Nilanjana S. Roy (born c. 1971) is an Indian journalist, literary critic, editor, and author. She has written the fiction books The Wildings and The Hundred Names of Darkness, and the essay collection The Girl Who Ate Books. She is the editor of the anthologies A Matter of Taste: The Penguin Book of Indian Writing on Food and Our Freedoms. In 2025, She was appointed as a member of the jury for 2026 International Booker Prize.

== Early life and education ==
Roy was born in Kolkata. She was educated at La Martiniere, Kolkata, attended St. Stephen's College, University of Delhi, and graduated with a degree in literature in the 1990s.

== Career ==
Over a more than twenty-year career as a columnist and literary critic, Roy has written for the Business Standard and Biblio. She has also written for The New York Times, The Guardian, the BBC, Outlook, The New York Review, The New Republic, Huffington Post and other publications. She has also worked as the chief editor at Westland (Limited) and Tranquebar Press.

Roy is represented by the renowned literary agent David Godwin.

Roy is the author of The Wildings, which won the Shakti Bhatt First Book Award in 2013. It was also shortlisted for the Tata Literature First Book Award (2012) and Commonwealth First Book Award, and longlisted for the DSC Prize (2013). In a review for DNA, Deepanjana Pal writes, "The world as imagined by Roy in this remarkable debut is filled with marvels, not the least of which is the feline social media network which makes Twitter look witheringly banal." Publishers Weekly wrote, "Roy's imaginative tale makes an evocative comment on life and survival."

The Hundred Names of Darkness, the sequel of The Wildings, was published in 2013. In a review for DNA, Rachel Pilaka writes, "Roy's animal kingdom certainly begs for a movie series." Roy is also the editor of A Matter of Taste: The Penguin Book Of Indian Writing On Food, an anthology of food writing.

In 2016, she released an essay collection titled The Girl Who Ate Books, that she wrote over twenty years. In a review for The Indian Express, Abhijit Gupta writes that it is a "book about books," and "Culled from Roy's columns for over two decades, the essays constitute a virtual Who's Who of the world of Indian English letters." In a review for Scroll.in, Devapriya Roy writes the book "is also about the literary lives and reading cultures in and of two cities, Delhi and Kolkata" and "contains Roy's insightful – often insider – observations on that highly diffuse yet vibrant category, Indian Writing in English." In a review for Mint, Sumana Roy writes the collection "documents the birth of a habit, of how the thing we casually call Indian English literature turned from curiosity to comfort—this is literary history told as observer and participant, and it is the latter that will make this book stand out among the many that I imagine being written many years later".

With Anikendra Nath Sen and Devangshu Datta, she edited Patriots, Poets and Prisoners: Selections from Ramananda Chatterjee's the Modern Review, 1907-1947, which was released in 2016. Salil Tripathi writes in Mint that the editors "have reminded India of how opinions were expressed once, and how that was possible even at a time when a colonial power ruled India." Roy also edited the 2021 anthology Our Freedoms, described in a review by Kalrav Joshi for The Wire as a book "about the politics of religion, caste and gender; the language of dissent; the limits of free expression; and challenges to constitutional democracy and secularism."

In 2025, it was announced that she'd be a member of the jury for the 2026 International Booker Prize along with Marcus du Sautoy, Sophie Hughes, and Troy Onyango.

== Bibliography ==
- A Matter of Taste: The Penguin Book of Indian Writing on Food, Edited by Nilanjana Roy, Penguin Books, 2005. ISBN 0143031481
- The Wildings, Aleph Book Company, 2012, Random House, 2016. ISBN 9788192328096
- The Hundred Names of Darkness, Aleph Book Company, 2013. ISBN 9789382277774
- The Girl Who Ate Books, Harper Collins, 2016. ISBN 9789350297117
- Patriots, Poets and Prisoners: Selections from Ramananda Chatterjee's the Modern Review, 1907-1947, Edited by Anikendra Nath Sen, Devangshu Datta and Nilanjana S Roy, Harpers Collins, 2016. ISBN 9789352640218
- Our Freedoms, Edited by Nilanjana Roy, Juggernaut Books, 2021. ISBN 9789353451455

== Personal life ==
She is married to Devangshu Datta, who is a columnist at the Business Standard. Her cats include Mara, Tiglath, Bathsheba, and Lola.
