= Parismita Singh =

Indian author, illustrator, and graphic novelist

- Born: Assam, India
- Education: St. Stephen's College, Delhi
- Occupations: Author, illustrator, graphic novelist, and educator
- Writing career
- Genres: Graphic novels, Children's books, Fiction, Non-fiction
- Notable works: The Hotel at the End of the World, Peace Has Come
- Notable awards: 2009 Shakti Bhatt First Book Prize shortlist
- Website: www.parismitasingh.com

Parismita Singh (born 1979/1980) is an Indian author, illustrator, graphic novelist, and educator. She is a founding member of the Pao Collective, and her work includes The Hotel at the End of the World, which was shortlisted for the Shakti Bhatt First Book Prize and is one of the first graphic novels published in India. She is also the author and illustrator of the short story collection Peace Has Come.

== Early life and education ==
Singh was born in Assam and raised in the town of Biswanath Chariali, about six hours away from Guwahati in Assam, India. Her grandmother, Durgamoni Saikia, would tell traditional folk tales, but adapted to include family members and historical events. Singh cites Maus as her inspiration for becoming a graphic novelist.

Singh attended St. Stephen's College in Delhi.

== Career ==
After publishing visual narratives in Tehelka and Little Magazine, Singh published her first graphic novel, The Hotel at the End of the World, in 2009, which was one of the first graphic novels published in India. She had spent more than two years developing the novel, and began working for the NGO Pratham in grassroots education in Assam in 2009. She then published short stories in Time Out and comics in The Siruvar Malar, while also working with the Pao Collective, and later published comics in Mint.

Singh is a founding member of the Pao Collective, with Orijit Sen, Sarnath Banerjee, Vishwajyoti Ghosh, and Amitabh Kumar. In December 2007, as a Centre for the Study of Developing Societies (CSDS) Sarai programme research fellow, along with Sarai fellow Banerjee, Singh presented "Comix/Comics: A Workshop on Comics and Graphic Novels" organized by the CSDS and the French Information and Resource Center, and met Sen at similar workshops. Over the course of workshops and presentations from 2007 through 2009, the founding members decided to organize a collective to promote comics and support comics artists in India, becoming the first organization in India to promote graphic novels and help artists "earn their daily bread (pao)". Singh contributed the chapter "Sleepscapes" to Pao: The Anthology Of Comics 1, published in 2012.

Singh wrote and illustrated Mara And The Clay Cows, a children's book based on a Tangkhul Naga folk tale, which was published in 2015. She also edited the 2018 anthology Centrepiece: Women’s Writing and Art from Northeast India. Over three years while working in Assam on education projects, she wrote and illustrated a collection of short stories set in Assam titled Peace Has Come, which was published in 2018.

In 2018 and 2019, she wrote and illustrated the articles "NRC: BJP Is On A Collision Course With Assamese 'Nationalists' Over Citizenship Bill" and "Assam NRC: Who Will Judge The Judges?", and co-wrote and illustrated "NRC Sketchbook: Ahead Of Deadline, One Final Rush For Inclusion In Assam", all published by HuffPost. While writing about the National Register of Citizens (NRC) and Assam, Sanjay Barbora stated, "Novelist Parismita Singh’s thoughtful and reflective pieces on the fallout of the NRC allude to the difficulties that such people have had to endure, as well as the potential for violence that it has brought in its wake."

== Books ==
- Singh, Parismita (2008). The Adventures of Tejimola and Sati Beula. Guwahati: Parismita Singh.
- Singh, Parismita (2009). The Hotel At The End Of The World. Penguin India. ISBN 9780143102946.
- Parismita Singh (2012). "Sleepscapes". In The Pao Collective (ed.). Pao: The Anthology Of Comics 1. Penguin India. ISBN 978-0143417682.
- Singh, Parismita (2015). Mara And The Clay Cows. Tulika Publishers. ISBN 978-93-5046-657-5.
- Singh, Parismita, ed. (2018). Centrepiece: Women's Writing and Art from Northeast India. Zubaan Books. ISBN 9789385932410.
- Singh, Parismita (2018). Peace Has Come. Westland. ISBN 9789386850508.

== Illustrated essays ==
- Singh, Parismita (December 10, 2018). "NRC: BJP Is On A Collision Course With Assamese 'Nationalists' Over Citizenship Bill". HuffPost.
- Singh, Parismita (July 28, 2019). "Assam NRC: Who Will Judge The Judges?". HuffPost.
- Singh, Parismita; Hussain, Shalim M (August 30, 2019). "NRC Sketchbook: Ahead Of Deadline, One Final Rush For Inclusion In Assam". HuffPost.

== Honors and awards ==
- 2009 Shakti Bhatt First Book Prize shortlist (The Hotel at the End of the World)
- Scroll.in Best of 2018: Non-fiction books to understand India and the world (Centrepiece: New Writing and Art from Northeast India)
