= The Scatter Here Is Too Great =

Novel written by Pakistani Bilal Tanweer

- Author: Bilal Tanweer
- Language: English
- Set in: Karachi, Pakistan
- Publisher: Random House (India); Jonathan Cape (Uk); HarperCollins (USA); Editions Stock (France); Hanser Verlag (Germany)
- Publication date: 2013 (India); 2014 (UK); 2014 (USA); 2014 (France); 2016 (Germany)
- Publication place: India
- Awards: Shakti Bhatt First Book Prize (2014)
- ISBN: 9788184005066

The Scatter Here Is Too Great is a debut novel by Pakistani writer Bilal Tanweer, published in 2013. It depicts the event of a bombing at a railway station in Karachi. The story has been told from the perspective of witnesses, victims, family members, friends, associates, and lovers. The novel was awarded the Shakti Bhatt First Book Prize in 2014, and was shortlisted for the DSC Prize for South Asian Literature and the Chautauqua Prize in 2015.

== Synopsis ==
The book tells stories of intersecting lives of ordinary people affected by a bomb blast. While some see it up close, for others it's just background noise. The book is narrated by a writer who is writing the story of these ordinary people because otherwise these stories would be lost.

The story has been told from different perspective including of witnesses, victims, family members, friends, associates, lovers.

== Main characters ==
- Narrator (unnamed): a journalist, writer and the narrator of the episodes Blackboards, The Truants, and Things and Reasons
- Comrade Sukhansaz: a leftist activist and a poet. He is the protagonist in the episodes After that, We Are Ignorant and A Bystander in To Live
- Sadeq: works for the bank recovery department. He is a friend of the writer of the story. He is the narrator of the episode Good Days

Other characters

- Teenage boy (unnamed): narrator of the episode To Live
- Sukhansaz's son (unnamed): narrator of the episode Lying Low
- Asma: Sadeq's girlfriend, and the protagonist of Turning to Stones
- Ambulance driver: protagonist of The World Doesn't End

== Publication history ==
The Scatter Here is Too Great was first published in India by Random House in 2013. It was published in the UK by Jonathan Cape in 2014, and in the US by HarperCollins the same year. Its French version (Le monde n'a pas de fin) was published by Editions Stock in 2014, It was published in Germany by Hanser Verlag in 2016.

== Reception ==
The novel is considered to be one of the breakthrough voices in Pakistan, and has been praised for its sensitive depiction of the struggles of ordinary people. Hirsh Sawhney writing for TheGuardian.com praised the novel for its 'haunting portrait of urban Pakistan'.

Somak Ghosal of Mint wrote: "although recognizably set in Karachi, Tanweer’s stories soar to mythical heights in the imagination of the characters, becoming gem-like testaments of loss that have resonances beyond the narrow trappings of national context". Evan Bartlett The Independent wrote that The Scatter Here is Too Great at first appears to be a rudimentary collection of disparate tales rather than one consistent body of work – but its layers of complexity are revealed as the story develops. A pattern, no doubt, in keeping with the author's own complicated relationship with this "broken, beautiful city" of his.

== Awards ==
- Won the Shakti Bhatt First Book Prize in 2014
- Shortlisted for the DSC Prize for South Asian Literature in 2015
- Shortlisted for the Chautauqua Prize in 2015

== Reviews ==
- Row, Jess (2014-09-26). "'The Scatter Here Is Too Great' by Bilal Tanweer". The New York Times. Retrieved 2020-11-23.
- Zahidi, Farahnaz (2013-12-15). "review: The Scatter Here Is Too Great - of guns and roses". The Express Tribune. Retrieved 2020-11-23.
