= David Devadas =

Indian journalist and author

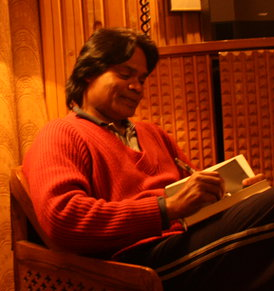
- Born: Mumbai, Maharashtra
- Education: St. Xavier's School, Delhi, St. Stephen's College, Delhi
- Notable work: In Search of a Future

David Devadas is an Indian journalist and an author. He is a contributing editor at Firstpost. His first book on the Kashmir conflict, In Search of a Future, which discusses the history of Kashmir conflict from 1931 onwards, was critically acclaimed.

== Career ==
Devadas is the author of The Generation of Rage in Kashmir (published by Oxford University Press), and In Search of a Future: The Story of Kashmir, a book on the Kashmir dispute. He has served as a distinguished fellow at the Institute of Social Sciences. He has also been a senior fellow at the Nehru Memorial Museum and Library, visiting professor at Jamia Millia Islamia, and political editor of Business Standard. He is a journalist with three decades of experience and has reported for India Today, The Indian Express, Gulf News, Hindustan Times and The Economic Times. He was a political editor at Business Standard. He served as a visiting professor at Jamia Millia Islamia University in 2005 and a senior fellow at the Nehru Memorial Museum and Library (2009–11). He has edited Jammu and Kashmir's largest English daily and worked at the Islamic University of Science and Technology at Awantipora, Kashmir.

== Published works ==
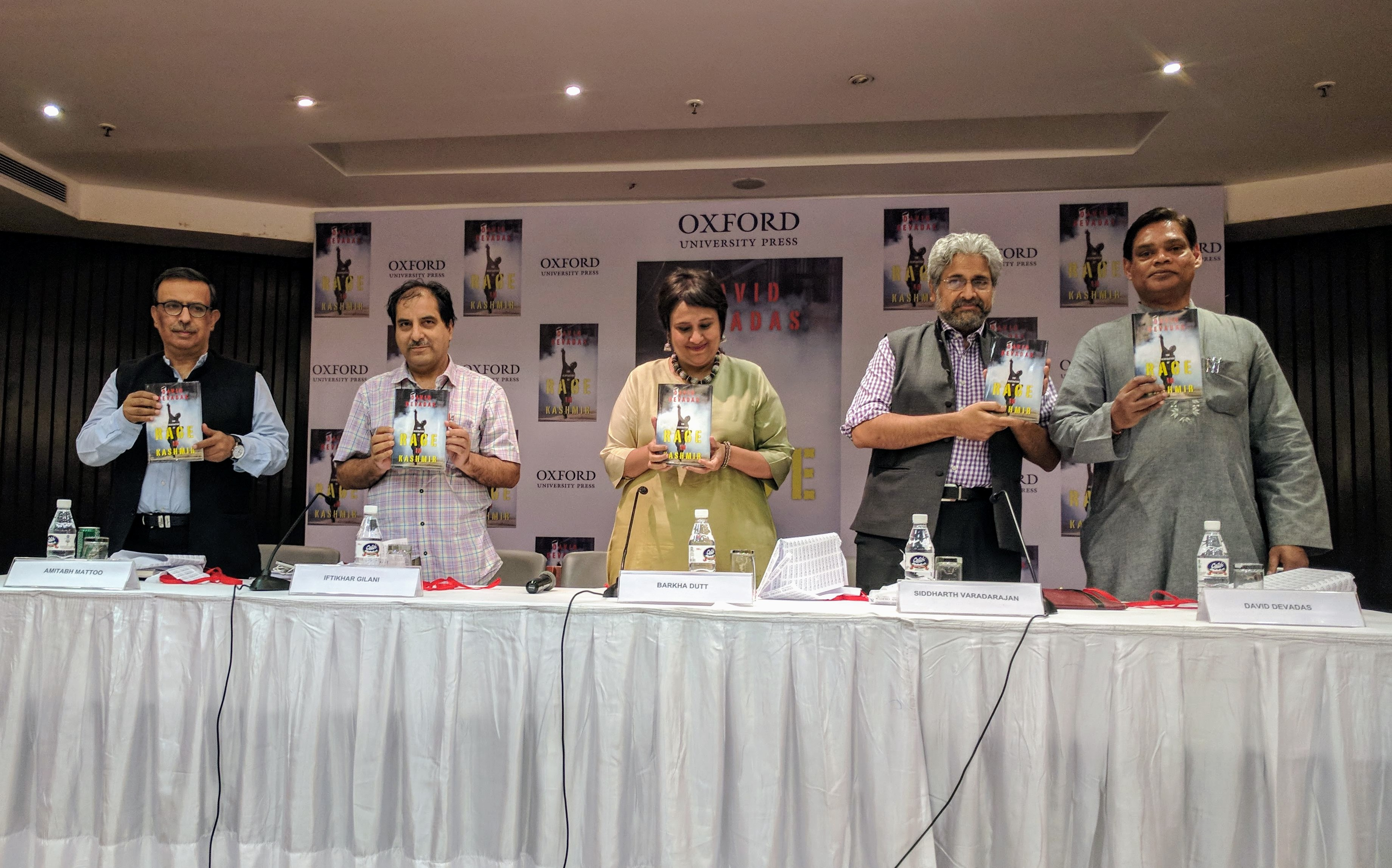
Book launch of "The Generation of Rage in Kashmir" by David Devadas (extreme right). Also in picture, Barkha Dutt, Siddarth Varadarajan, Amitabh Mattoo and Iftikhar Gilani.

- In Search of a Future (2007)
- The Generation of Rage in Kashmir (2018)
- The Story of Kashmir: Geopolitics, Politics, Society, Culture and Changing Aspirations (2019)
