= Early Indians =

2018 book by Tony Joseph

Early Indians: The Story of Our Ancestors and Where We Came From
- Author: Tony Joseph
- Language: English
- Subject: Human population genetics
- Genre: Popular science
- Publisher: Juggernaut Books
- Publication date: 20 December 2018
- Publication place: India
- Media type: Print (hardcover)
- Pages: 256
- ISBN: 938622898X

Early Indians: The Story of Our Ancestors and Where We Came From is a 2018 nonfiction book written by Indian journalist Tony Joseph, that focuses on the ancestors of people living in South Asia today. Joseph goes 65,000 years into the past—when anatomically modern humans first made their way from Africa into the Indian subcontinent. The book relies on research findings from six major disciplines: history, archaeology, linguistics, population genetics, philology, and epigraphy, and includes path-breaking ancient DNA research of recent years. It also relies on the extensive study titled "The Genomic Formation of Central and South Asia", co-authored by 92 scientists from around the world and co-directed by geneticist David Reich of Harvard Medical School, in which ancient DNA was used. The book has been translated into Bengali, Tamil, Hindi, Odia, Telugu, Marathi, Malayalam, Gujarati, and other languages.

== Description ==
The book discusses four prehistoric migrations in India. It posits that the Harappans were a mixture of Zagros agriculturists (from the modern-day Iran area) and First Indians, a wave of migrants who came from Africa into Arabia and then reached India around 65,000 years ago. Citing recent DNA evidence, the book traces the subsequent large migrations of anatomically modern humans into India—of agriculturalists from Iran between 7000 and 3000 BCE and Indo-European-speaking pastoralists from the Central Asian Steppe (Aryans) between 2000 and 1000 BCE, among others. Joseph uses the layers of a pizza as a metaphor to explain the makeup of subcontinental society.

The book also discusses similarities and differences between the Indus Valley Civilization and early Vedic civilization. It mentions that "Aryan" culture was most likely the result of interaction, adoption, and adaptation among those who brought Indo-European languages to India and those who were already well-settled inhabitants of the region, and that Sanskrit and the Vedas developed in the Indian subcontinent. According to Joseph, Proto-Dravidian is related to the Elamitic language of Iran. The caste system in India is a recent social system, reflected in sharply reduced inter-marriage and genetic mixing after 100 AD. The book also takes into account the path-breaking DNA research and findings by geneticist David Reich.

== Reception ==
Early Indians was well received by readers and many critics. Sujatha Byravan wrote in The Hindu that the book tells a compelling story of our forefathers based on genetic evidence. Bangladeshi-American writer Razib Khan opined that the book presents a clear understanding of early Indians. Swaminathan Aiyar of The Times of India thought that the book helps us understand how all Indians have African, Harappan, and Steppe Asian genes in different doses. Author Gurcharan Das said that the book helps readers understand that Indians are composed of a large number of small populations. Kesavan Veluthat of The Hindu stated that the book shows a firm basis on which the study of Indian history can begin. This is of especial importance in the context of the post-truth conditions of the present, when myth-making seeks to replace authentic knowledge. In June 2019, Indian geneticists from the Centre for Cellular and Molecular Biology reviewed Early Indians in the journal Current Science and praised Joseph for synthesizing the chronology of the movement of modern humans into the Indian subcontinent from the first "out-of-Africa" humans to recent migrants, citing new findings from the fields of archaeology, anthropology, linguistics, and genetics. Nobel Prize-winning structural biologist Venki Ramakrishnan described the book as a "very readable account".

== Awards ==
- Best Non-fiction Books of the Decade (2010–2019) – The Hindu
- Book of the Year Award (non-fiction), Tata Literature Live, 2019 – The Wire
- Shakti Bhatt First Book Prize 2019 – The Indian Express
- Atta Galatta Award for Best Non-Fiction, 2019 – Deccan Herald
- One of the 10 Best New Prehistory Books to Read in 2020, as identified by BookAuthority

== See also ==
- The Horse, the Wheel, and Language – 2007 book by anthropologist David W. Anthony
- Proto-Indo-European language
- Peopling of India
- Haplogroup R1a
- Shahr-e Sukhteh
- Who We Are and How We Got Here – 2018 book by David Reich
- Bactria–Margiana Archaeological Complex
- Recent African origin of modern humans
