= Reuben Jonathan Miller =

American writer and sociologist (born 1976)

- Born: Chicago, Illinois, U.S.
- Occupations: Writer; sociologist; criminologist; social worker

Academic background
- Education: Chicago State University (B.A.); University of Chicago (A.M.); Loyola University Chicago (PhD)

Academic work
- Discipline: Sociology
- Sub-discipline: Race and racialization; punishment and social welfare policy; criminal legal studies

Reuben Jonathan Miller (born in 1976) is an American writer, sociologist, criminologist and social worker. He is a professor of sociology at the University of California, Berkeley and a research professor at the American Bar Foundation.

Miller studies social life at the intersections of race, justice and social welfare policy, attending to what our systems of punishment and care tell us about ourselves and the moral and ethical state of a given nation. His research has been published in journals of law, criminology, human rights, sociology, public health, social work and psychology. In 2022, he was awarded a "genius grant" through the MacArthur Fellows Program for his work tracing the long-term consequences of incarceration and prisoner re-entry on families in the United States and the ways that mass incarceration has changed the social life of the American city.

He is the author of the 2021 book Halfway Home: Race, Punishment, and the Afterlife of Mass Incarceration. Halfway Home makes the case that once incarcerated, one is never truly free. Rather, "prison follows you like a ghost," shaping everyday interactions and altering the contours of American democracy one (most often poor and Black) family at a time. Following incarcerated and formerly incarcerated people and people directly (and indirectly) impacted by the incarceration of their loved ones, Miller draws from his experience as the brother and son of formerly incarcerated men to make sense of how mass incarceration shapes American citizenship and the work people with records do each day to find and make dynamic lives for themselves and their families. Halfway Home was a finalist for the PEN/John Kenneth Galbraith Award for Nonfiction and the Los Angeles Times Book Prize for Current Affairs. It won the 2022 Herbert Jacob Book Prize and two PROSE Awards, one for Excellence in Social Science and the other in Cultural Anthropology and Sociology from the Association of American Publishers.

== Early life and education ==
Miller was born in Chicago. He earned a B.A. from Chicago State University (2006), an A.M. from the University of Chicago (2007), and a PhD from Loyola University Chicago (2013).

== Career ==
Miller began his career as a volunteer chaplain at the Cook County Jail. Upon completing a doctorate in sociology in 2013, he worked as an assistant professor of Social Work at the University of Michigan. In 2016, he was awarded membership at the Institute for Advanced Study in Princeton, New Jersey. In 2017 he joined the faculty at the University of Chicago and was promoted to associate professor with tenure in 2021. Earlier that year, he published his first solely authored book, Halfway Home: Race, Punishment, and the Afterlife of Mass Incarceration. In 2022, Miller was awarded a MacArthur Fellowship for his research on the ways that incarceration has shaped the social world and its long-term impacts on the poor (especially poor Black people) in the United States.

== Bibliography ==
- Miller, Reuben Jonathan. Halfway Home: Race, Punishment, and the Afterlife of Mass Incarceration. Little Brown and Co. 2021.
- Miller, Reuben Jonathan. "All Leviathan’s Children: Race, Punishment and the (Re-) Making of the City." In Class, Ethnicity and State in the Polarized Metropolis, pp. 215–229. Palgrave Macmillan, Cham, 2019.
- Miller, Reuben Jonathan, and Forrest Stuart. "Carceral citizenship: Race, rights and responsibility in the age of mass supervision." Theoretical Criminology 21, no. 4 (2017): 532–548.
- Miller, Reuben Jonathan & Amanda Alexander. "The price of (carceral) citizenship: Punishment, surveillance and social welfare policy in an age of carceral expansion". Michigan Journal of Race and Law 21 (2): 291-311 2016).
- Miller, Reuben Jonathan, Janice Williams Miller, Jelena Zeleskov Djoric, & Desmond Upton Patton. "Baldwin’s Mill: Race, Carceral Expansion and the Pedagogy of Repression, 1965-2015". Humanity and Society, 39(4): 456-475 (2015).
- Miller, Reuben Jonathan. "Devolving the carceral state: Race, prisoner reentry, and the micropolitics of urban poverty management". Punishment & Society 16, no. 3 (2014): 305–335.

== Awards and recognitions ==
- 2022 MacArthur Fellowship, John D. and Catherine T. MacArthur Foundation
- 2022 Herbert Jacob Book Prize, Law and Society Association
- 2022 PROSE Award, Excellence in Social Science, Association of American Publisher
- 2022 PROSE Award, Cultural Anthropology and Sociology, Association of American Publishers
- 2022 Finalist, PEN America/ John Kenneth Galbraith Literary Award for Nonfiction
- 2022 Finalist, LA Times Book Prize, Current Affairs
- 2022 Finalist, PROSE Award, Outstanding Trade Publication, Association of American Publishers
- 2022 Rockefeller foundation Academic Writing Residency, Bellagio, Italy
- 2022 Logan Nonfiction Writing Residency, Rensselaerville, NY
- 2019 Eric and Wendy Schmidt National Fellow, New America Foundation, Washington D.C.
- 2019 Visiting Demographer, Population Research Center, University of Texas at Austin.
- 2018 Visiting Fellow, Dartmouth Society of Fellows, Dartmouth University
- 2014 Summer Research Institute Fellow, Racial Democracy, Crime and Justice Network, Ohio State University
- 2011 Dissertation Fellow, Department of Housing and Urban Development
- 2011 Graduate Minority Fellow, American Society of Criminology
- 2009 Doctoral Fellowship, Chicago Center for Family Health
- 2008 Rising Star Award, Policy Link
- 2007 Robert R. McCormick Foundation Graduate Fellowship
- 2006 Graduate Fellowship, Albert Schweitzer Foundation
- 2004 Volunteer Service Award, Cook County Department of Corrections
