= Indrapramit Das =

Indian science fiction writer and editor

- Born: Kolkata, India
- Education: Franklin & Marshall College (BA); University of British Columbia (MFA)
- Occupations: Writer, editor, critic
- Writing career
- Genres: science fiction, fantasy, speculative fiction
- Notable awards: Lambda Literary Award (2017); Shirley Jackson Award (2019); British Fantasy Award (2024)
- Website: indradas.com

Indrapramit Das (also known as Indra Das) is an Indian science fiction, fantasy, and cross-genre writer, critic, and editor. His fiction has appeared in several publications including Clarkesworld Magazine, Asimov’s Science Fiction, Strange Horizons, and Tor.com, and has been widely anthologized in collections including Gardner Dozois' The Year's Best Science Fiction.

== Background and education ==
Indra Das is from Kolkata. He is an Octavia E. Butler Scholar and a graduate of the 2012 Clarion West Writers Workshop. Das received a BA in Creative Writing from Franklin & Marshall College in Lancaster, Pennsylvania, where he also studied film. He later completed an MFA in Creative Writing at the University of British Columbia in Vancouver.

== Career ==
Das is a former consulting editor of speculative fiction for Indian publisher Juggernaut Books.

His debut novel, The Devourers, won the 29th Lambda Literary Award in the SF/F/Horror category. The novel was shortlisted for the 2016 Crawford Award and the 2017 Otherwise Award. It was included in the 2015 Locus Recommended Reading List and was nominated for the Shakti Bhatt Prize and the Tata Live! Literature First Book Award in India. The Devourers was originally published in 2015 by Penguin Books India and received North American distribution by Del Rey the following year.

Das has written about books, comics, TV, and film for publications the include Slant Magazine, Vogue India, Elle India, Strange Horizons, and Vancouver Weekly.

His short story "Kali_Na" won the 2019 Shirley Jackson Award for Best Short Fiction and made the honor list for the 2019 Parallax Award given by the Carl Brandon Society. His novelette "Breaking Water" was a finalist for the 2016 Shirley Jackson Award.

In 2023, Subterranean Press published his novella, The Last Dragoners of Bowbazar, in both ebook and limited edition hard copy formats. Locus praised the novella, describing it as "a gorgeously written novella which is part coming-of-age tale, part love letter to fantasy, part family mystery, and part elegantly understated fable of identity." The book won the 2024 British Fantasy Award for Best Novella. It was a finalist for the 2024 Locus Award.

Das edited and wrote the introduction for the 2024 anthology Deep Dream: Science Fiction Exploring the Future of Art from MIT Press. The book is part of MIT Press's annual science fiction anthology series, Twelve Tomorrows. The anthology was named one of "The Best Sci-Fi Books of 2024" by Esquire. It was a finalist for the 2025 Ignyte Award for Anthology/Collected Works.

Das was nominated for the Ember Award at the 2025 Ignyte Awards.

== Bibliography ==
=== Novels ===
- The Devourers. Penguin Books India & Del Rey Books. 2015. ISBN 9781101967539.

=== Novellas ===
- The Last Dragoners of Bowbazar. Subterranean Press. 2023. ISBN 9781645240877.

=== Short fiction ===
- "Kolkata Sea", Flash Fiction Online (2010)
- "Looking the Lopai in the Eyes", Redstone Science Fiction (2010)
- "The Widow and the Xir", Apex Magazine (2011)
- "Weep for Day", Asimov's Science Fiction (2012), reprinted in Clarkesworld (2015)
- "Muo-Ka's Child", Clarkesworld (2012)
- "Sita's Descent" (2012)
- "The Runner of n-Vamana" (2013)
- "Karina Who Kissed Spacetime", Apex Magazine (2013)
- "The Little Begum", Steampunk World (2014)
- "A Moon for the Unborn", Strange Horizons (2014)
- "The Muses of Shuyedan-18", Asimov's Science Fiction (2015)
- "Psychopomp", Interfictions Online (2015)
- "Breaking Water", Tor.com (2016)
- "The Worldless", Lightspeed Magazine (2017) (also appeared as: "Variant: The Wordless")
- "The Moon Is Not a Battlefield", Infinity Wars (2017)
- "The Shadow We Cast Through Time", New Suns (2019)
- "The Song Between Worlds", Future Tense Fiction (2019)
- "A Shade of Dusk" (2019)
- "Kali_Na", The Mythic Dream (2019)
- "Incarnate" (2020)
- "The Road from Kothali", Verve Magazine (2020)
- "You Will Survive This Night", Come Sit With Us By The Fire, Volume 2 (2021)
- "A Necessary Being" (2021)
- "Here Comes Your Man", Tasavvur (2022)
- "Of All the New Yorks in All the Worlds", Tor.com (2022)
- "As Wayward Sisters, Hand in Hand", The Book of Witches (2023)

=== Anthology (as editor) ===
- Deep Dream: Science Fiction Exploring the Future of Art. MIT Press. 2024. ISBN 9780262549080.
