= Sujatha Gidla =

Indian-American author

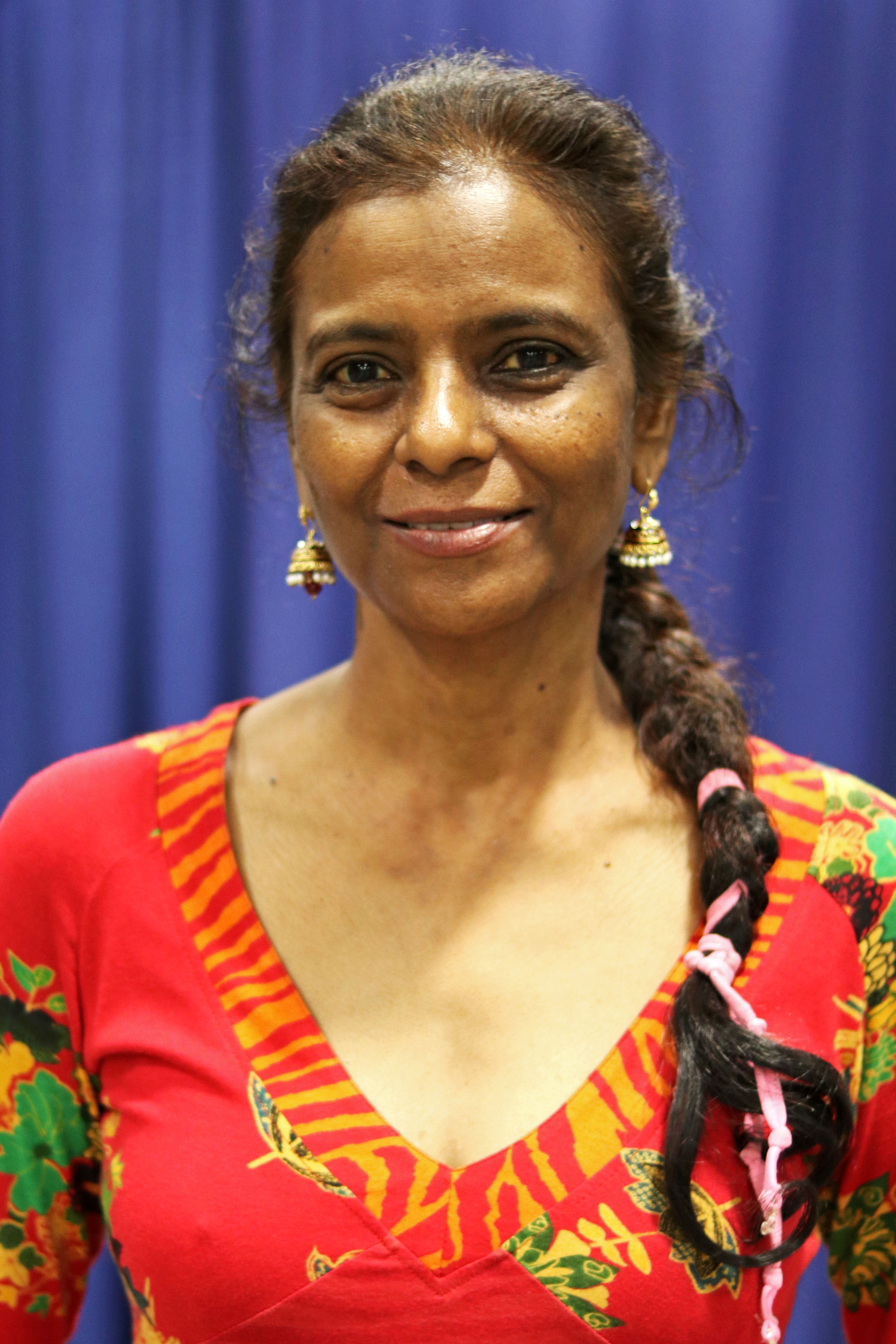
- Sujatha Gidla at the 2018 National Book Festival
- Born: 1963 (age 62–63); Kakinada, Andhra Pradesh, India
- Education: National Institute of Technology, Warangal; Indian Institute of Technology Madras
- Occupations: Author, train conductor
- Writing career
- Genres: Non-fiction, Memoir
- Notable works: Ants Among Elephants: An Untouchable Family and the Making of Modern India
- Notable awards: Shakti Bhatt First Book Prize (2018)

Sujatha Gidla (born c. 1963) is an Indian-born American author and train conductor. She is the author of the critically acclaimed 2017 book, Ants Among Elephants: An Untouchable Family and the Making of Modern India. She works as a conductor for the New York City Subway.

== Early life and education ==
Sujatha Gidla was born in Kakinada, Andhra Pradesh, into a Telugu Dalit family that belonged to the Mala caste. Her family was educated by Canadian missionaries in the 1930s, which was unusual for Dalits at the time. Both of her parents were college lecturers. Her maternal uncle, K.G. Satyamurthy, was a prominent communist leader and a co-founder of the Naxalite group People's War Group.

Gidla studied physics at the Regional Engineering College, Warangal. She was also a researcher in applied physics at the Indian Institute of Technology Madras.

In 1990, at the age of 26, Gidla moved to the United States. She initially worked in software development and later for the Bank of New York.

== Career and writing ==
After being laid off from her bank job during the 2008 financial crisis, Gidla sought a change in career. Drawn to what she described as "romantic feelings about being a working class person" stemming from her Marxist beliefs, she applied to work for the MTA. In 2009, she became the first Indian woman to be hired as a conductor on the New York City Subway, a job she continues to hold.

Gidla began writing what would become Ants Among Elephants after years of conversations with her mother and relatives about their family's history. Although the caste system was officially abolished in 1950, Dalits, formerly known as "untouchables," continue to face widespread discrimination. The project began as an effort to understand the relationship between caste and religion, but evolved into a sprawling family saga.

=== Ants Among Elephants ===
Gidla's debut book, Ants Among Elephants: An Untouchable Family and the Making of Modern India, was published by Farrar, Straus and Giroux in 2017. The book is a work of literary non-fiction that chronicles the lives of her mother, Manjula, and her uncle, K. G. Satyamurthy, against the backdrop of modern Indian history. It details their struggles with poverty, caste discrimination, and their involvement in India's communist and revolutionary movements. The title refers to the social hierarchy of the caste system, where Dalits are the "ants" living in the shadow of the powerful "elephants."

The book received widespread critical acclaim. In The New York Times, Michiko Kakutani praised it for giving readers an "unsettling and visceral understanding of how discrimination, segregation and stereotypes have endured." The Economist called it "quite possibly the most striking work of non-fiction set in India since Behind the Beautiful Forevers by Katherine Boo." Pankaj Mishra in The New York Review of Books wrote that it "significantly enriches the new Dalit literature in English."

Ants Among Elephants was named a top ten non-fiction book of 2017 by The Wall Street Journal and a best book of the year and featured author on the front cover by Publishers Weekly. In 2018, the book won the Shakti Bhatt First Book Prize.
