= Bernice Yeung =

American writer and investigative journalist

Bernice Yeung is an American journalist. She is the managing editor at the U.C. Berkeley School of Journalism investigative reporting program. Previously, she was an investigative journalist for ProPublica where she covered labor and unemployment. She is the author of In a Day's Work: The Fight to End Sexual Violence Against America's Most Vulnerable Workers, which was published in 2018 by The New Press and examines the hidden stories of blue-collar workers overlooked by the #MeToo movement. The book is based on reporting that Yeung began in 2012 when she was a reporter for Reveal, and it was honored with the 2018 Goddard Riverside Stephan Russo Book Prize for Social Justice, the 2019 PEN/John Kenneth Galbraith Award, and was a finalist for the 2019 Pulitzer Prize for General Nonfiction. She is currently based in Berkeley, California.

== Education and career ==
Yeung earned her bachelor's degree in journalism from Northwestern University and her master's degree from Fordham University where she studied sociology with a focus on crime and justice. She was a 2015-2016 Knight-Wallace fellow at the University of Michigan where she researched how social science survey methods could be used in reporting.

Before working at ProPublica, Yeung was a reporter for Reveal, a podcast and public radio show created by the Center for Investigative Reporting. During that time, Yeung worked on the national Emmy-nominated Rape in the Fields reporting team, which reported on the sexual assault of immigrant farm workers. This project won an Alfred I. duPont–Columbia University Award (2014) and a Robert F. Kennedy Journalism Award (2014) and was a finalist for the Goldsmith Prize for Investigative Reporting. Yeung was also lead reporter for the national Emmy-nominated Rape on the Night Shift team, which investigated sexual violence against female janitors. This work won the Investigative Reporters and Editors Award, the Society of Professional Journalists Sigma Delta Chi Award for investigative journalism, and the Third Coast/Richard H. Driehaus Foundation Competition.

One of her first journalism jobs was on the staff of Metro Silicon Valley in 1996 and 1997 and she later worked as a staff writer for SF Weekly and as an editor at California Lawyer magazine. Her work has also appeared in The New York Times, The Seattle Times, The Guardian and PBS Frontline, among other media outlets.

In 2002, Yeung helped co-found Hyphen, an Asian American magazine.
