= Preti Taneja =

British writer

Preti Taneja FRSL
- Born: United Kingdom
- Education: St. John's College, Cambridge University; City University; Royal Holloway University, London
- Occupations: Writer, screenwriter and educator
- Notable work: We That Are Young (2017)
- Awards: Desmond Elliott Prize Gordon Burn Prize

Preti Taneja FRSL is a British writer, screenwriter and educator. She is currently professor of world literature and creative writing at Newcastle University. Her first novel, We That Are Young, won the Desmond Elliott Prize and was shortlisted for several awards, including the Republic of Consciousness Prize, the Prix Jan Michalski, and the Shakti Bhatt Prize. In 2005, a film she co-wrote was shortlisted for the Palme d'Or at the Cannes Film Festival. Taneja's second book, Aftermath, is an account of the 2019 London Bridge terror attack, and describes her knowledge of the victims, as well as her experience having previously taught the perpetrator of the attacks in a prison education programme. It won the Gordon Burn Prize for 2022.

== Biography ==
=== Early years and education ===
Taneja was born in the United Kingdom, daughter of pioneering Indian cookery writer and food entrepreneur Meera Taneja. and grew up in Letchworth, Hertfordshire, where she attended St Francis College,

She studied theology, religion, and philosophy along with Sanskrit at St. John's College, Cambridge University. She went on to complete two post-graduate qualifications - a P.G. Dip. in print journalism from City University, London, and an M.A. degree in creative writing from Royal Holloway University, London, before completing a doctorate in creative writing from Royal Holloway University.

=== Teaching, editing, and film ===
Taneja initially worked as a reporter for a non-governmental organization, covering human rights issues, and particularly focusing on the American invasion of Iraq in 2003. She is the editor of Visual Verse, an online magazine of poetry and art, and is a contributing editor for The White Review and for the publisher And Other Stories. She has been a judge for several literary awards, including The White Review Short Story Prize, the Wasafiri Prize, the inaugural Orwell Prize for Political Fiction, and the Desmond Elliott Prize. In December 2021, along with So Mayer she was appointed to chair English PEN's translation advisory group. She is currently Professor of World Literature and Creative Writing at Newcastle University.

Taneja and Ben Crowe co-wrote the screenplay for a film titled The Man Who Met Himself, which was nominated for the Palme d'Or for short films at the Cannes Film Festival in 2005. In 2013, she wrote and produced a feature film, Verity's Summer.

=== Writing ===
Taneja published her first novel, We That Are Young, in 2017. The book was a re-imagining of Shakespeare's play King Lear, and was set in contemporary India. It won the Desmond Elliott Prize for best debut novel in 2018, the Eastern Eye Award for literature in 2019, and was nominated for several other literary prizes, including the Rathbones Folio Prize, the Prix Jan Michalski, the Jhalak Prize, the Shakti Bhatt Prize, and Republic of Consciousness Prize. Taneja researched the book in India, traveling to several locations including Kashmir. In 2019, Gaumont announced that they would be adapting We That Are Young for television.

Taneja's second book, Aftermath, deals with the circumstances of the 2019 London Bridge terror attack. The perpetrator of the attack, Usman Khan, had attended a creative writing course that Taneja had taught at HMP Whitemoor as part of a prison education programme called Learning Together, and the attack was conducted while Khan attended a Learning Together conference on licence. Although Taneja had been invited to attend the conference, she did not go, but personally knew one of the victims of the attack as her colleague in the education programme. Aftermath is an account of the incident, told through poetry, journalism and Taneja's own memoirs. It won the Gordon Burn Prize for 2022.

== Awards and honours ==
- 2018: Winner, Desmond Elliott Prize – We That Are Young
- 2018: Longlisted, Jhalak Prize – We That Are Young
- 2018: Longlisted, Prix Jan Michalski – We That Are Young
- 2018: Shortlisted, Republic of Consciousness Prize – We That Are Young
- 2018: Shortlisted, Shakti Bhatt Prize – We That Are Young
- 2019: Winner, Eastern Eye Award for Literature – We That Are Young
- 2022: Winner, Gordon Burn Prize – Aftermath
- 2023: Elected as a Fellow of the Royal Society of Literature

== Bibliography ==
- We That Are Young (2017) (UK: Galley Beggar Press)
- We Are That Young (2018) (USA: AA Knopf)
- Aftermath (2021) (USA: Transit Books)
- Aftermath (2022) (UK: And Other Stories)
