= Siddharth Kara =

Indian author

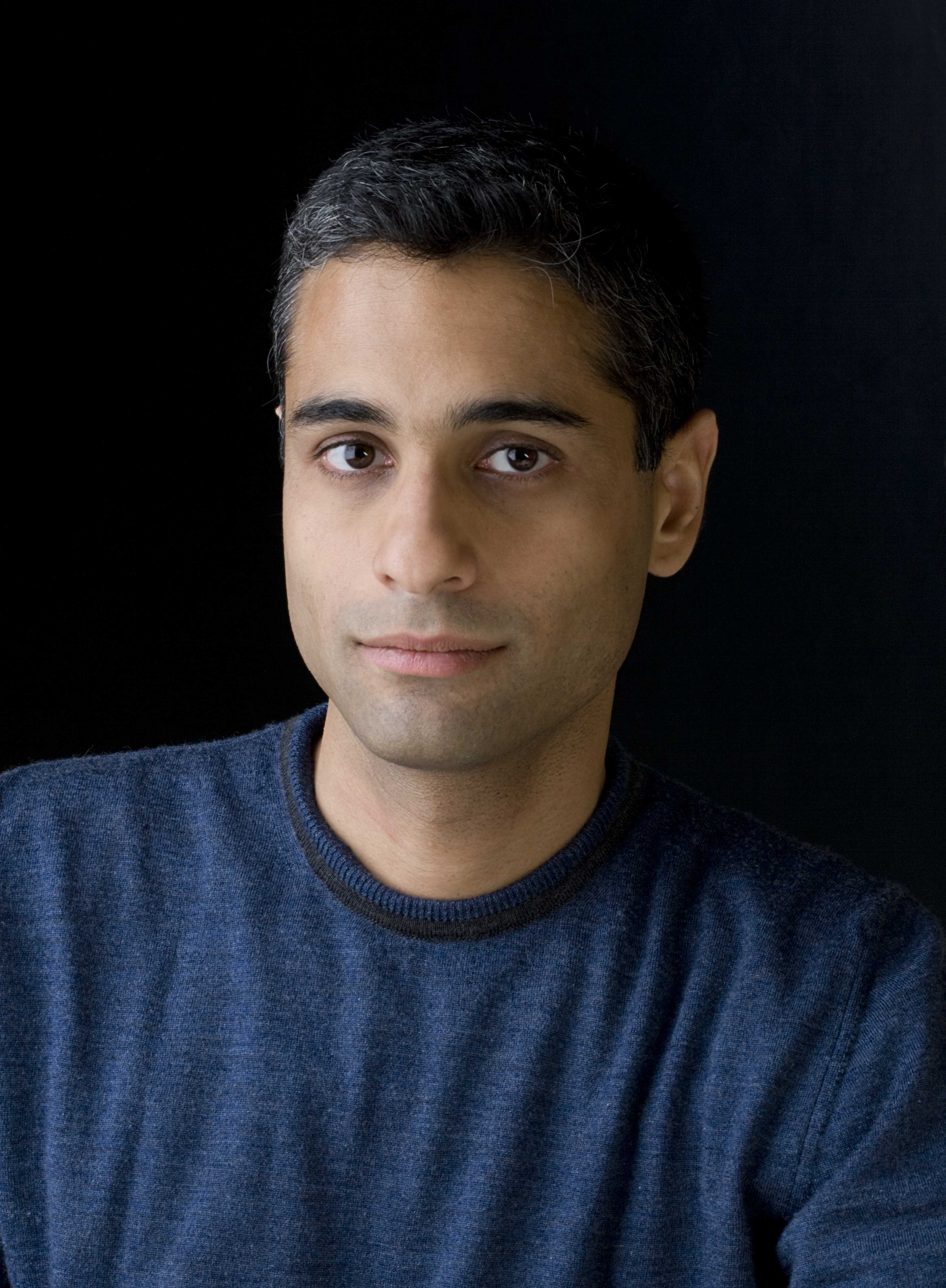
- Born: Knoxville, Tennessee, U.S.
- Education: Duke University (BA); Columbia University (MBA); BPP University (LLB)
- Occupations: Author, professor

Siddharth Kara is a New York Times-bestselling author who has been a finalist for the Pulitzer Prize. He is a former British Academy Global Professor and has held academic positions at Harvard University, University of California Berkeley, and the University of Nottingham. He is best known for his books Cobalt Red: How the Blood of the Congo Powers Our Lives (2023) and The Zorg: A Tale of Greed and Murder That Inspired the Abolition of Slavery (2025). He has also published a trilogy on modern slavery: Sex Trafficking: Inside the Business of Modern Slavery (2009), Bonded Labor: Tackling the System of Slavery in South Asia (2012), and Modern Slavery: A Global Perspective (2017).

== Education and early career ==
Kara received a BA in English and Philosophy from Duke University. While at Duke University, Kara co-founded the Duke Refugee Action Project, which was the precursor to the Hart Leadership Program at the Sanford School of Public Policy. The project was set up to enable students to volunteer in Bosnian refugee camps in the former Yugoslavia. He and a few other students obtained a grant from the university, learned basic Bosnian, and procured placements from the United Nations High Commissioner for Refugees to volunteer at camps in the region.

Kara worked as an investment banker at Merrill Lynch in New York City for several years, during which time he was involved in some of the firm's largest mergers and acquisitions and equity financing transactions.

He received an MBA from Columbia University. After graduating, he embarked on the first of several long self-funded journeys across the world to research contemporary slavery and child labor. He later received a law degree from the BPP Law School in London.

== Research and writing ==
Kara's research travels have taken him to more than fifty countries across six continents.

=== The Zorg (2025) ===
The Zorg: A Tale of Greed and Murder That Inspired the Abolition of Slavery (2025) is a history of the 18th century slave ship Zorg massacre. The book corrects errors in the historical accounts of the massacre and reveals new details that had not been previously known. The Zorg also charts the first movement to abolish slavery in England that was inspired by a court case about the massacre.

The Zorg has been named to the New York Times 100 Notable Books of 2025; Time Magazine 100 Must Read Books of 2025; and The New Yorker Best Books of 2025. It was a finalist for the PEN/John Kenneth Galbraith Award for Nonfiction and the Silver Gavel Award from the American Bar Association.

The Zorg audiobook, narrated by Dion Graham, was also a finalist for Audible Audiobook of the Year in two categories, nonfiction and history.

The Zorg was runner-up for the 2026 Mark Lynton History Prize awarded by the Columbia Journalism School and the Nieman Foundation for Journalism at Harvard University, and it was also Longlisted for the 2026 HWA Crown Award for best history book.

=== Cobalt Red (2023) ===
In January 2023, Kara's non-fiction book Cobalt Red: How the Blood of the Congo Powers Our Lives was released by St. Martin's Press and debuted on the New York Times Bestseller List. Cobalt Red is the first-ever book to investigate human rights and environmental abuses involving the mining of cobalt in the Democratic Republic of the Congo.

Kara has appeared in the media to talk about the human rights abuses involved with cobalt mining, including on The Joe Rogan Experience, Fresh Air, CNN, Fox News, and ABC News.

Cobalt Red was a finalist for the 2024 Pulitzer Prize for General Nonfiction, a finalist for the 2024 PEN/John Kenneth Galbraith Award for Nonfiction, shortlisted for the 2023 Financial Times Business Book of the Year Award, named to the NY Times list of 100 Notable Books for the 2023, named to the New Yorker list of Best Books for the 2023, listed as one of the Best Books of 2023 by Goodreads, and named one of the Top 16 Books of 2023 by WIRED.

=== Modern Slavery: A Global Perspective (2017) ===
Kara's third non-fiction book on contemporary slavery, Modern Slavery: A Global Perspective, was released by Columbia University Press in October 2017. The book had its launch at the United Nations, and has been lauded by experts in the field, including Luis CdeBaca, former U.S. Ambassador-at-Large to Monitor and Combat Trafficking in Persons, and Swanee Hunt, former U.S. Ambassador to Austria.

=== Bonded Labor: Tackling the System of Slavery in South Asia (2012) ===
Kara's second non-fiction book on contemporary slavery, Bonded Labor: Tackling the System of Slavery in South Asia, was released by Columbia University Press in October 2012. The book focuses on the system of bonded labor, encompassing roughly six out of every ten slaves in the world. Its geographic focus is South Asia, covering such industries as hand-woven-carpet making, tea and rice farming, construction, brick manufacture, and frozen-shrimp production.

The book received high commendations from scholars, activists, non-profit organizations and governments, and was covered as part of a three part series on the CNN International primetime news program Connect the World with Becky Anderson.

=== Sex Trafficking: Inside the Business of Modern Slavery (2009) ===
Kara's first non-fiction book on contemporary slavery, Sex Trafficking: Inside the Business of Modern Slavery, was published by Columbia University Press in January 2009. The book won the 2010 Frederick Douglass Book Prize, given to a nonfiction book on the subject of slavery and/or abolition movements.

The book has been recommended by the Under-Secretary-General of the United Nations and head of the United Nations Office on Drugs and Crime. It has been lauded by academics, policy-makers, and the press, with the Financial Times describing it as an "eloquent and campaigning book", and slavery experts heralding it as "groundbreaking" and the "best book yet on the enduring problem of modern-day slavery".

== Media ==
Kara has appeared extensively in the media as an expert on modern slavery, including appearances on The Joe Rogan Experience, Fresh Air, CNN, Fox News, ABC News, and CNBC.

Kara is a regular contributor to The CNN Freedom Project: Ending Modern Day Slavery, CNN's initiative to expose modern-day slavery around the world and highlight the efforts being made to eradicate it.

== Academia ==
=== British Academy and University of Nottingham, UK ===
In the summer of 2020, Kara was one of 10 experts and scholars awarded a Global Professorship by the British Academy. As part of the program he began an associate professor position with the Rights Lab and the School of Sociology and Social Policy at the University of Nottingham in October 2020.

Kara's Global Professorship culminated in the August 2025 publication of the report Blood Batteries: The Human Rights and Environmental Impacts of Cobalt Mining in the Democratic Republic of the Congo.

=== Harvard University ===
In the fall of 2009, Kara became the first Fellow on Human Trafficking with the Carr Center for Human Rights Policy at the Kennedy School of Government at Harvard University. In the spring of 2012, Kara taught the first course on human trafficking at the Harvard Kennedy School. He also accepted a joint appointment as a visiting scientist on forced labor at the FXB Center for Health and Human Rights at Harvard School of Public Health. In the spring of 2013, Kara became an adjunct lecturer in public policy at the Kennedy School.

=== University of California, Berkeley ===
In the spring of 2016, Kara became a lecturer on global poverty at the Blum Center for Developing Economies at the University of California, Berkeley, teaching the same course on slavery and trafficking that he taught later in the year at Harvard University.

== Personal ==
Kara spends his time between Los Angeles and London. He is married to neuroscientist Aditi Shankardass.
