= Akash Kapur =

Indian-American journalist and author

- Born: Nagpur, India
- Occupations: Author, journalist
- Notable work: India Becoming, Better to Have Gone
- Website: http://www.akashkapur.com/

Akash Kapur is a writer, academic, and technology policy specialist. He is the author of two books, India Becoming (Penguin/Riverhead, 2012) and Better to Have Gone (Scribner, 2021). He has consulted or worked at a number of organizations on technology policy, including UNDP, NYU, Princeton, and New America.

He is a former columnist for the New York Times, and has published his work in various magazines and journals, including the New Yorker, the Atlantic, the Economist, and more. Kapur was awarded a Whiting Nonfiction Grant for Better to Have Gone, which was named a book of the year by The New York Times, The Wall Street Journal, CNN, The New Statesman, Airmail, Idler magazine, and Scribd. The book was a bestseller and it was shortlisted for the Tata LitLive prize, and longlisted for the Chautauqua prize.

== Early life and education ==
Kapur was born to a Punjabi Indian father and American mother and raised near Auroville. He attended boarding school at Phillips Academy, Andover in the United States when he was sixteen. Kapur graduated summa cum laude from Harvard University with a major in Social Anthropology. He has a DPhil in Law from Oxford University (Nuffield College), which he attended as a Rhodes Scholar. He also attended the SAIIER (Sri Aurobindo International Institute of Educational Research) school in Auroville.

== Career ==
=== Writing and journalism ===
Kapur is the former "Letter from India" columnist for the New York Times. In 2010, his columns for the New York Times received an "Honorable Mention" award by The Society of Publishers in Asia (SOPA), which praised Kapur's "brilliant accounts of developments in modern India."

Kapur has spoken several times on NPR radio in America, public radio in Australia, and NDTV in India. Kapur speaks fluent French, and has also spoken on radio and TV programs in France, including on France 24, France Inter, and Radio France Internationale. India Becoming was published in France under the title L'Inde de Demain (2014, Albin Michel).

==== India Becoming ====
Published in 2012, India Becoming: A Portrait of Life in Modern India is an account of change and transformation in India, told through a handful of characters whose lives are followed by the author over time. The book was selected by The New Yorker and The New Republic as a Best Book of 2012; by Newsweek as one of its three Must Reads on Modern India; and by The New York Times Book Review as an "Editors' Choice." The book was short listed for the Shakti Bhatt Prize, and an episode from the book was excerpted in The New Yorker magazine. In Time magazine, Pico Iyer wrote that India Becoming was "impressively lucid and searching" and added that, "In his clarity, sympathy and impeccably sculpted prose, Kapur often summons the spirit of V.S. Naipaul."

==== Auroville: Dream and Reality ====
Auroville: Dream and Reality (Penguin 2018) is an anthology of writing from the intentional community of Auroville, where Kapur grew up. The book contains numerous archival writings and photos seeking to demystify daily life in the community.

==== Better to Have Gone ====
Published in July 2021, Better to Have Gone: Love, Death and the Quest for Utopia in Auroville is part family memoir, part history, and part mediation on the nature of faith, idealism, and the utopian impulse. A mix of genres, it starts as a standard non-fiction narrative, but is increasingly augmented by relevant remarks and reflections of an autobiographical nature. Auroville's uniqueness and spirit, controversial struggles, dramatic events, and current status are presented chronologically, in an easy journalistic style. Portraits of key community figures, including, Sri Aurobindo Ghose (1872–1950), Mirra Alfassa [the Mother] (1878–1973), Satprem (1923–2007), and Amrit (born 1943), are drawn. Lives of residents are followed, two well-known Aurovilians: Kapur's wife's mother, Diane Maes (1950–1986), and her partner John Walker (1942–1986). Kapur himself and his wife Auralice Graft (born 1972) are interested participants. Occasional poetic passages contribute nuance and seasoning to the text. John's letters also are quoted many times.

The book was widely reviewed and covered in the media, including a profile of the author and his wife in the New York Times, two reviews in the New York Times, and multiple radio interviews, including with Terry Gross on NPR's Fresh Air. In a cover review for the New York Times Book Review, Amy Waldman wrote: "This is a haunting, heartbreaking story, deeply researched and lucidly told, with an almost painful emotional honesty — the use of present tense weaving a kind of trance. I kept wanting to read “Better to Have Gone” because I found it so gripping; I kept wanting not to read it because I found it so upsetting. The image that came to mind, again and again, was of human lives being dashed against the rocks of rigid belief."

Better to Have Gone was selected as an "Editor's Choice" by the New York Times and was named a book of the year by The New York Times, The Wall Street Journal ("Writers' Favorite Books"), CNN, The New Statesman, Airmail, Idler magazine, and Scribd. The book was shortlisted for the Tata LitLive prize, longlisted for the Chautauqua prize. It was a bestseller and received a Whiting Nonfiction Grant.

Kapur is particularly known for his writings on utopianism and the potential and limits of idealism. He has also taught on utopianism at Princeton University. In his writing and interviews, Kapur has expressed skepticism about the utopian impulse and referred to himself as an "incrementalist." This position has sometimes drawn criticism, but Kapur states that his views are shaped by his own upbringing in a utopian society and his firsthand experience of the extremism to which utopianism often leads. Kapur states that he has spent time studying and traveling in Eastern Europe, and this informs his views of utopianism.

=== Technology Policy ===
Kapur's PhD thesis at Oxford focused on the effects of new technologies on economic and social development, and especially on the digital divide. He has frequently written on technology policy and technology ethics, including for the New Yorker, the Economist the Wall Street Journal, and Foreign Policy.

He is a Senior Fellow in tech policy at the GovLab at NYU, and at New America foundation. He is also a Visiting Scholar at Princeton University, where he works on digital public infrastructure (DPI). Kapur has taught on DPI at Princeton and written about its global spread.

Kapur has consulted for a variety of organizations on technology policy, including the United Nations Development Program (UNDP) and The Markle Foundation. Kapur is the author of "Internet Governance," published by UNDP, a manual widely used by policymakers in Asia and developing countries. Kapur is also a founding member of the Academic Council of Krea University, which seeks seeks to reimagine liberal arts for the twenty first century in India.

== Bibliography ==
=== Books ===
- Kapur, Akash (2012). India becoming : a portrait of life in modern India. Penguin/Riverhead.
  - Translation: L'Inde de demain (in French). Albin Michel. 2014.
- —, ed. (2018). Auroville : dream and reality. Penguin.
- — (2021). Better to have gone : love, death and the quest for utopia in Auroville. Scribner.

=== Essays and reporting ===
- Kapur, Akash (January 25, 2021). "Top of the world : how not to see the Himalaya". The Critics. Books. The New Yorker. 96 (45): 68–71. (Note: Online version is titled "Can we see past the myth of the Himalaya?".)

———————

Bibliography notes
