= Tony Joseph =

Indian journalist and author (born 1963)

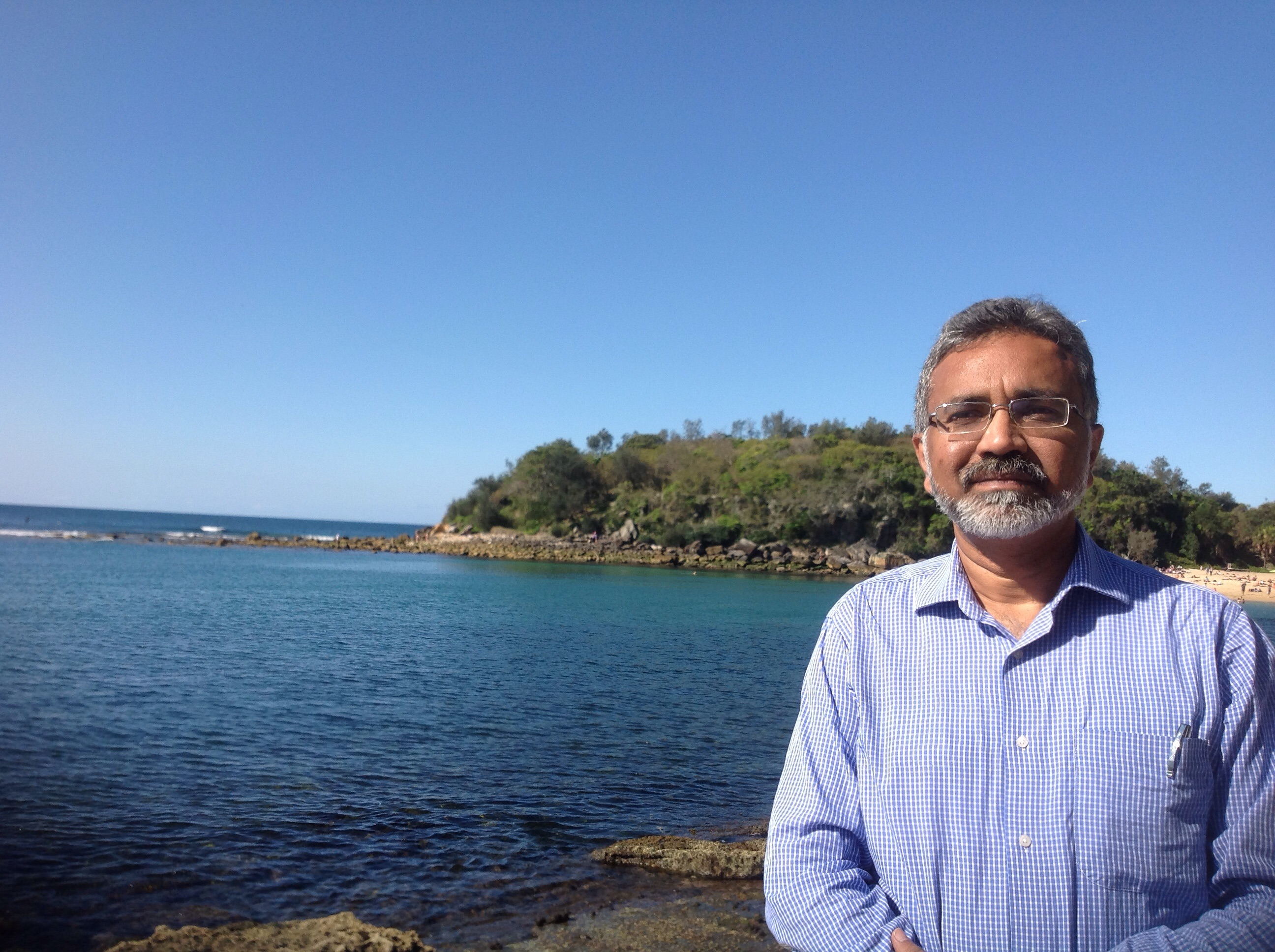
- Born: 12 March 1963 (age 63); India
- Occupations: Author and journalist
- Spouse: Sheba Jose
- Children: 1 daughter

Tony Joseph (born 12 March 1963) is an Indian journalist and former editor of Businessworld magazine. He is also the author of the best-selling book Early Indians: The Story of Our Ancestors and Where We Came From (2018). Until 2018, he was also the chairman and co-founder of Mindworks Global Media Services. He is based in New Delhi. Joseph has been an editor and a journalist for over three decades and was, at various times, features editor of The Economic Times, associate editor of Business Standard and editor of Businessworld magazine (from 1998). His articles have appeared in Outlook India, Quartz, Live Mint and The Hindu.

Early Indians is focused on four prehistoric migrations that shaped the demography of India, including the migrations after 2000 BC.

== Personal life ==
Joseph is married to Sheba Jose, and the couple has a daughter. Joseph described himself as an atheist.

== Published works ==
- Early Indians: The Story of Our Ancestors and Where We Came From. Juggernaut. 2018. ISBN 978-93-8622-898-7.
