= Raghu Karnad =

Indian writer and journalist

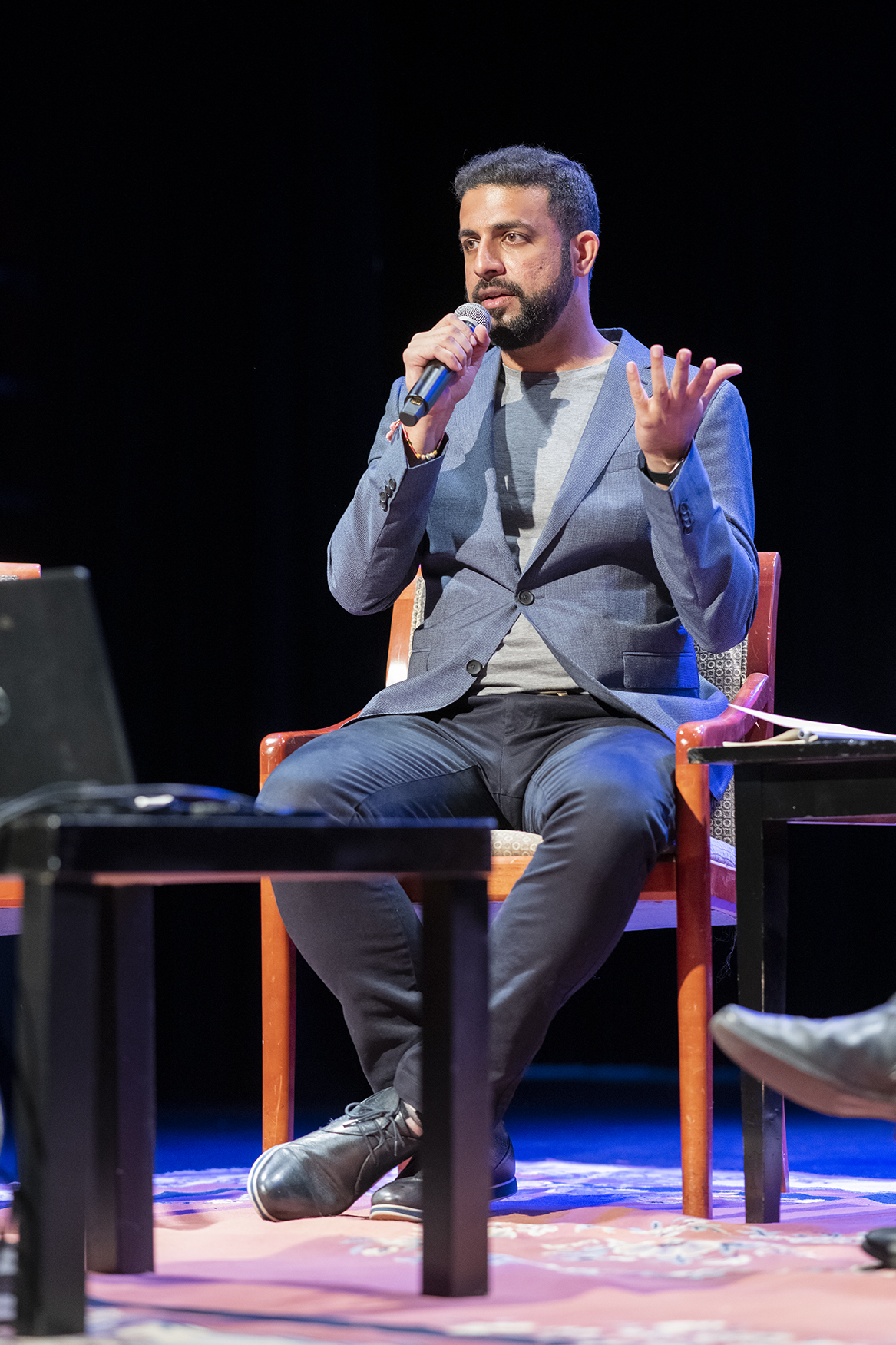
- Karnad in 2019
- Education: Swarthmore College; St Cross College, University of Oxford
- Occupations: Journalist, writer
- Notable work: Farthest Field – An Indian Story of the Second World War
- Father: Girish Karnad

Raghu Karnad is an Indian journalist and writer. He is a co-founder of The Wire, an independent news platform in India. Karnad is best known for his book Farthest Field: An Indian Story of the Second World War, which won the Sahitya Akademi Yuva Puraskar and the Windham–Campbell Literature Prize for Non-Fiction. His work often explores themes of history, politics, and culture.

== Early life and education ==
Karnad is the son of playwright and actor Girish Karnad and Dr Saraswathy Ganapathy. He completed his schooling in Bengaluru before attending Swarthmore College in the United States. During his studies, he spent a semester at the American University in Cairo and managed to secure a meeting with Yasser Arafat. In 2008, he completed an MSc in Contemporary India at St Cross College, the University of Oxford.

== Career ==
Karnad was a journalist for Tehelka Magazine in 2008. He reported on conflict and survival situations, including an award-winning cover story filed from Bhopal.

He later served as the editor of Time Out Delhi. Karnad is a widely published essayist, and his work has appeared in The New Yorker, The Atlantic, Granta and The Guardian.

In 2019, he was one of the writers invited to the Neilson Hays Bangkok Literature Festival.

In addition to print journalism, he has hosted podcasts like Friend of the Court, which examines India's landmark constitutional cases.

=== The Wire and journalism ===
In 2015, Karnad was part of the founding team of The Wire (India), and later held the position of Chief of Bureau in New Delhi including during India's 2019 general elections. He has written, produced, and presented video essays for TheWire, and a short documentary film titled Encounter: A Killer Cop Speaks.

Karnad consulted on the critically acclaimed Netflix documentary series Bad Boy Billionaires, which was partly based on his 2012 investigative essay in The Caravan.

=== Books ===
In 2015, Karnad published Farthest Field: An Indian Story of the Second World War, a nonfiction narrative exploring India's role in World War II through the personal histories of his family members. The book won the Sahitya Akademi Yuva Puraskar in 2016. It was also shortlisted for the Tata Literature Live! First Book Award, the Crossword Book Award, and the Hessell-Tiltman Prize in the same year. In 2019, it won the Windham–Campbell Literature Prize for Nonfiction.

The book received a starred review from Publishers Weekly, and historian Simon Winchester, writing for The New York Times, described it as "so heart-stoppingly beautiful I want all around to read it too."

A Marathi translation by Karuna Gokhale was published in 2015 through Rajhans Prakashan.

A precursor to Farthest Field, Karnad's long-form essay Everybody's Friend was published as an e-book in 2012. Historian Simon Schama, writing for the Financial Times, called it "nothing short of brilliant."

== Awards ==
- 2022: Cullman Fellowship at the New York Public Library Dorothy and Lewis B. Cullman Center for Scholars and Writers.
- 2019: Windham–Campbell Literature Prize for Non-Fiction for Farthest Field: An Indian Story of the Second World War.
- 2018: Pulitzer Center on Crisis Reporting Grant for a story on tribal women, education, and dispossession for "The Diverging Paths of Two Young Women Foretell the Fate of a Tribe in India".
- 2016: Yuva Puraskar in English for Farthest Field: An Indian Story of the Second World War.
- 2012: Financial Times-Bodley Head Essay Prize Runner-Up for Everybody's Friend: Looking for the Second World War in India's North-East.
- 2008: Lorenzo Natali 2nd Prize for Asia and the Pacific for "Air, Water, Earth and the Sins of the Powerful".
- 2008: Press Institute of India National Award for Reporting on the Victims of Armed Conflict for "The Hunting Party Returns".

== Bibliography ==
- Everybody's Friend. Random House. 2013. ISBN 978-1448181650.
- Farthest Field – An Indian Story of the Second World War. William Collins. 2015. ISBN 978-0008133238.
