= Jamil Ahmad =

Pakistani civil servant (1931–2014)

- Born: 1 June 1931; Punjab, British India (modern Pakistan)
- Died: 12 July 2014 (aged 83); Islamabad, Pakistan
- Occupations: Novelist, Short story writer
- Spouse: Helga
- Awards: Sitara-e-Imtiaz (2016); Shortlisted for Man Asian Literary Prize (2011)

Jamil Ahmad (June 1, 1931 – July 12, 2014) was a Pakistani civil servant, novelist and story writer. He wrote in the English language. He is known for his anthology, The Wandering Falcon which was short listed for Man Asian Literary Prize, widely known as Asia's highest literary award, in 2011. The book was also a finalist for DSC prize for South Asian Literature in 2013.

He died on 12 July 2014.

== Biography ==
The Wandering Falcon, says Kashmiri writer, Basharat Peer, one of the finest collections of short stories to come out of South Asia in decades.

This is not a book in which a central protagonist will walk down a path and invite the readers to follow him, narrative and personality cohering around him along the way, wrote writer, Kamila Shamsie, Instead, it is a book of glimpses into a world of strict rules and codes, where the individual is of far less significance than the collective.

Jamil Ahmad was born in Punjab, in the erstwhile British India, in 1931. After early education in Lahore, he joined the civil service in 1954, and worked in the Swat valley, a remote Hindu Kush area, near Afghan border. During his career, he worked at various remote areas such as the Frontier Province, Quetta, Chaghi, Khyber and Malakand. His experiences in these tribal valley assisted him in his work which was mainly focused on the lives of the tribal villagers. He also served at the Pakistani embassy in Kabul during the Soviet invasion of Afghanistan in 1979.

He married Helga whom he met during his London years, who was critical of his early attempts at poetry but diligently tried to promote his work, The Wandering Falcon, which was nominated for Man Asian Literary Prize in 2011. The couple had two sons and a daughter at the time of his death.

== Work ==
The Wandering Falcon can either be construed as a short story collection or a novel, based on differing perspectives. The book narrates the story of Tor Baz (the black falcon) and his travails through the remote tribal areas along the Pakistan - Afghan border where he experiences the lives of the ethnic pashtuns. The stories travel through the strict code of conduct of the tribals known as pashtunwali, the lawlessness of the land where women are traded as commodity, adultery and anarchism, silhouetted against the Baluch desert landscape. The book received critical acclaim.

Jamil Ahmad has also published a short story, The Sins of the Mother, which appeared on Granta112: Pakistan in 2010.
