= Khalid Akhtar =

Urdu-language writer

Muhammad Khalid Akhtar
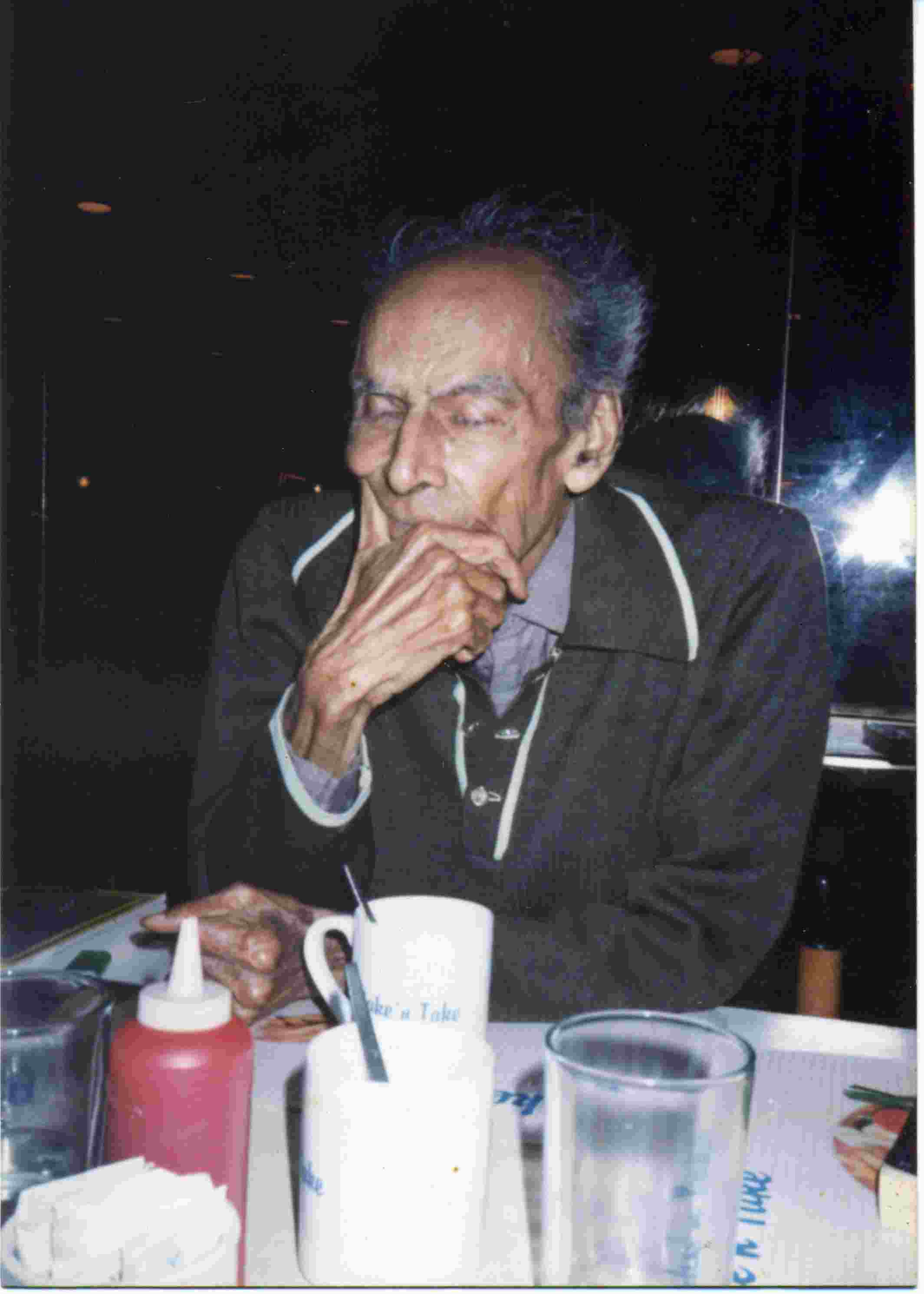
- Khalid Akhtar picture
- Born: 1920; Bahawalpur, Punjab, British India
- Died: 2 February 2002 (aged 81–82); Karachi, Sindh, Pakistan
- Occupation: writer
- Writing career
- Period: 1943 to 2000
- Genre: Humour
- Notable work: Chakiwara Main Visal

Mohammad Khalid Akhtar (Urdu: محمد خالد اختر), (1920-2 February 2002), was an Urdu-language writer. His 1964 satirical novel Chakiwara Mein Visal won the Adamjee Literary Award in 1967.

== Bibliography ==
- Chakiwara main Visal (1964).
- Khoya Hoa Ufaq (A collection of stories, sketches, satirical essays, the winner of the Adamjee Award in 1967).
- Bees So Giyara (A novel published in 1950 and republished in 1999).
- Yatra (A travelogue published in 1990).
- Do Safar (A travelogue – 1984
- Chacha Abdul Baqi – Stories (Satire) – 1985
- Makatib E Khizar
- Ibn-i-Jubair ka safar (A travelogue published in 1994)
- Laltain Aur Dosari Kahaniyan (Stories and a novella published in 1984)

A complete collection of his short stories, travelogues, and articles is being published by Oxford University Press.
