= In Search of a Future =

2007 book by David Devadas

In Search of a Future: The Story of Kashmir
- Author: David Devadas
- Language: English
- Published: 2007
- Publisher: Viking Penguin
- Publication place: India
- ISBN: 9780670081509

In Search of a Future: The Story of Kashmir is a book written by Indian journalist and author David Devadas, first published in 2007 by Viking Penguin. The book discusses the history of Kashmir, starting with the revolt of the Muslim majority populace against their ruler, and traces the roots of the insurgency in the state of Jammu and Kashmir. Devadas spent about 9 years researching the book.
