= Zara Chowdhary =

Indian author and winner of Shakti Bhatt prize

- Born: Chennai, India
- Education: University of Leeds (MA); Iowa State University (MFA)
- Occupations: Writer, producer, educator
- Writing career
- Genres: Memoir, creative nonfiction
- Notable work: The Lucky Ones
- Notable awards: Shakti Bhatt Prize (2025)
- Website: www.zarachowdhary.com

Zara Chowdhary is an Indian writer, producer, and educator. Her debut memoir, The Lucky Ones, was published in 2024 and received critical acclaim. She is the winner of the 2025 Shakti Bhatt Prize.

== Early life and education ==
Chowdhary was born in Chennai, India. She earned a Master of Arts in Writing for Performance from the University of Leeds and a Master of Fine Arts in Creative Writing and Environment from Iowa State University.

== Career ==
Before becoming a full-time writer and educator, Chowdhary worked in film, advertising, and media production for over a decade. Her work has been featured on Channel V, National Geographic India, and Turner Classic Movies.

Chowdhary is currently a lecturer at the University of Wisconsin–Madison, where she teaches courses in Hindi, South Asian cultures, protest poetry, and creative nonfiction. Her writing has been published in various anthologies and journals, including New Moons edited by Kazim Ali, Flyway Journal, and Cotton Xenomorph.

=== The Lucky Ones ===
Chowdhary's debut memoir, The Lucky Ones, was published by Crown Publishing Group in 2024. The book is a personal account of her experience as a sixteen-year-old during the 2002 Gujarat riots. The memoir explores themes of trauma, family, and the rise of Hindutva in India.

The Lucky Ones received widespread critical acclaim. It was named one of the ten best nonfiction books of 2024 by Time magazine, and was included in best-of-the-year lists by NPR, Esquire, and Ms. The book received starred reviews from Kirkus Reviews and Publishers Weekly.

In 2025, Chowdhary was awarded the final iteration of Shakti Bhatt Prize for The Lucky Ones.

== Personal life ==
Chowdhary resides in Madison, Wisconsin, with her family.

== Works ==
- Chowdhary, Zara (2024). The Lucky Ones. Crown Publishing Group. ISBN 978-0593727430.
