= The Devourers =

2015 novel by Indra Das

- First edition
- Author: Indra Das
- Cover artist: Dan Burgess
- Genre: Dark fantasy Science fiction Speculative fiction
- Published: 2015 (India); July 2016 (U.S.)
- Publisher: Penguin India (India); Ballantine Del Rey (U.S.)
- Publication place: India
- ISBN: 978-1101967515

The Devourers is a 2015 debut novel by Indian writer, artist, and editor Indra Das (aka Indrapramit Das). It takes place in Kolkata, India, where Das grew up, and is considered South Asian speculative fiction and dark fantasy, incorporating aspects of historical fiction, fantasy, and horror. It was originally published by Penguin India in 2015, followed by release in North America by Ballantine Del Rey of Penguin Random House in July 2016.

The novel features shape-shifters, more specifically werewolves, and explores the concepts of love, cannibalism, and what it means to be human. It is told in a multi-layered manner, alternating between different time periods and perspectives. The author's writing has been compared to that of Margaret Atwood, China Miéville, and David Mitchell by his publisher.

The novel grew out of werewolf stories he wrote during college, which he called "male-centered," with the female characters being either prey or prostitutes who are raped "so that a male predator can come to terms with his own predatory nature." Das claimed those early versions of characters remain in his final novel and also said, "but the novel was woven around questioning how easily I, as a straight male writer, slipped so comfortably into using this misogynistic narrative device of taking away the voice of women, even while exploring violence against women (and ostensibly questioning and criticizing it)."

== Plot ==
The story, which takes place primarily in Kolkata, is set during the reign of the Mughal Empire in the seventeenth century and extends to modern India. The main character, Alok Mukherjee, is a college professor and historian who happens upon a stranger that tells him a story about shape-shifters that devour human souls in order to survive. The stranger claims that the tale he tells it true, and although Alok is skeptical, he is intrigued and insists on finishing the story. Alok is then enlisted to translate and transcribe a collection of notebooks and texts documented on human skin, through which the rest of the story is told.

== Reception ==
The Devourers was shortlisted for the 2015 Shakti Bhatt First Book Prize, the 2015 TATA Live! Literature First Book Award, and the 2016 International Association for the Fantastic in the Arts William L. Crawford Fantasy Award. It was also listed as a 2015 selection for Locus Recommended Reading.

"Not for the squeamish, Das' debut is an ambitious, unsettling trip into our own capacity for violence," according to Kirkus Reviews. Author of The Obelisk Gate, N. K. Jemisin, concluded in her review for The New York Times, ”Readers will savor every bite."

In a starred review, Publishers Weekly praised Das' debut novel as "brutal, intoxicating, and gorgeously visceral." Podcast host and writer for Tor.com Mahvesh Murad described The Devourers similarly and expanded on the sentiment: "It is violent and vicious and deeply unsettling for a number of reasons. But it is also showcases Das’ incredible prowess with language and rhythm, and his ability to weave folklore and ancient legend with modern day loneliness."

Malisa Kurtz at The Los Angeles Review of Books said, "The experience of reading Indra Das’s The Devourers novel is like watching a surrealist film: it is poetic, playful, and at times miraculous." She pointed out that though "very little happens plotwise in the novel" the book invokes strong feelings in the reader. "Das’s novel asks readers to mull over the causes of these feelings, to reflect on why they so intimately affect us..." Kurtz rounds out the review by saying, "Stories like The Devourers are powerful. Such storytelling deserves attentive readers..."
