= Ants Among Elephants =

2017 book by Sujatha Gidla

Ants Among Elephants: An Untouchable Family and the Making of Modern India
- Author: Sujatha Gidla
- Language: English
- Genre: Non-fiction
- Publisher: Farrar, Straus and Giroux
- Publication date: 2017
- Publication place: United States
- Pages: 320
- ISBN: 978-0-86547-811-4

Ants Among Elephants: An Untouchable Family and the Making of Modern India is a 2017 book by Sujatha Gidla on how India's untouchables (Dalits) struggle to overcome poverty and social ostracism due to the rigid caste system. The book deals with the humiliation and caste-based discrimination which Dalits face in India. The book also looks at the various levels of oppression faced due to caste, gender, and familial norms. Writing in The New York Review of Books, Pankaj Mishra says that the book "significantly enriches the new Dalit literature in English" and that the book is a "devastating critique" of India's independence leaders and the caste politics of the Naxalite movement in India.
