= The Lucky Ones (memoir) =

2024 memoir by Zara Chowdhary

- Author: Zara Chowdhary
- Cover artist: Arsh Raziuddin
- Language: English
- Genre: Memoir
- Publisher: Crown Publishing Group
- Publication date: July 16, 2024
- Publication place: India, United States
- Media type: Print (Hardcover, Paperback), e-book
- ISBN: 978-0-593-72743-0

The Lucky Ones is a 2024 memoir by Zara Chowdhary. The book recounts her experiences as a sixteen-year-old during the 2002 Gujarat riots in Ahmedabad, India. It explores themes of religious violence, trauma, family dynamics, and the rise of Hindu nationalism. The book received critical acclaim and was the winner of the 2025 Shakti Bhatt Prize.

== Synopsis ==
In 2002, Zara Chowdhary is a teenager living with her family in Ahmedabad. The narrative begins as the Godhra train burning precipitates widespread anti-Muslim violence. Chowdhary, her family, and other Muslim residents find themselves under siege for three months, fearing for their lives as mobs target their community. The memoir details the family's confinement within their apartment, the psychological toll of the violence, and the breakdown of civil society around them.

The book interweaves Chowdhary's personal coming-of-age story with the broader political and social history of Gujarat and India. It delves into her family's multigenerational history, exploring their origins and the complexities of their identity as Muslims in India. Chowdhary also examines the internal dynamics of her family, including her father's experiences with discrimination, her mother's resilience, and her relationship with her grandmother. The narrative reflects on how the violence reshaped her understanding of home, identity, and belonging.

== Themes ==
A central theme of The Lucky Ones is the nature of trauma and memory. Chowdhary explores how both personal and collective trauma are processed, remembered, and often erased. In an interview, she stated that she felt compelled to write the book after the Citizenship Amendment Act protests in 2019, when she felt the history of the Gujarat riots was being forgotten or distorted.

The memoir is also a critique of rising Hindu nationalism and the political climate in India. Chowdhary connects the events of 2002 to the subsequent political trajectory of Narendra Modi, who was the Chief Minister of Gujarat at the time of the riots.

Family and identity are other significant themes. The book examines the fault lines within Chowdhary's own family, including domestic tensions and generational differences in coping with discrimination. She explores broader questions of what it means to be an Indian Muslim and the struggle to claim one's identity on one's own terms.

== Reception ==
The Lucky Ones received starred reviews from Kirkus Reviews and Publishers Weekly. Kirkus called it a "tight, suspenseful narrative that interweaves one girl's keen observations of family within India's problematic history."

Writing for Washington Post, reviewer Bilal Qureshi described the memoir as "a visceral work of bearing witness, recounted with exacting and unapologetic subjectivity." Colleen Mondor in Booklist noted that by "blending her story with a history of India's fraught ethnic tensions and a nearly journalistic documentation of the attacks, the author sheds new perspective on the events."

Time magazine named it one of the ten best nonfiction books of 2024, calling it "a harrowing survivor's tale, an important history lesson, and a desperate warning from someone who has seen the tragic effects of ethnic violence." The book was also a finalist for the 2025 PEN/Galbraith Award for Nonfiction.

In June 2025, it was announced that The Lucky Ones was the winner of the Shakti Bhatt Prize, with the foundation praising it as a "brave and striking account."
