= Numair Atif Choudhury =

Bangladeshi author, academic, and research scholar (1974–2018)

- Born: November 4, 1974; Dhaka, Bangladesh
- Died: September 9, 2018 (aged 43); Kyoto, Japan
- Education: University of East Anglia; University of Texas at Dallas
- Occupations: Author, academic and scholar
- Writing career
- Language: English
- Period: 2001 – 2018
- Notable work: Babu Bangladesh!

Numair Atif Choudhury, a Bangladeshi author, academic, and research scholar, achieved posthumous recognition for his sole novel, "Babu Bangladesh!" (Harper Fourth Estate, 2019), which garnered a place on the shortlist for the Shakti Bhatt First Book Prize in 2019. This marked the inaugural instance in which an Indian literary award acknowledged a posthumously published original work. Notably, Choudhury is the first author of Bangladeshi origin to receive a nomination for this prestigious award. His untimely demise occurred in Kyoto, Japan, following the submission of the final draft of his aforementioned novel, accentuating the poignant circumstances surrounding his literary legacy.

== Background ==
Choudhury, born on November 4, 1974, in Bangladesh, pursued his academic endeavors with a commitment to the literary arts. Upon the completion of his secondary education at Bangladesh International Tutorial in Dhaka, he matriculated into Oberlin College's Creative Writing Program, culminating in his graduation in 1997. Subsequently, he undertook advanced studies at the University of East Anglia, Norwich, where he pursued a Master's degree in Creative Writing and Development Studies from 1999 to 2001. Transitioning to the University of Texas at Dallas, Choudhury assumed the role of Graduate Assistant before embarking on his doctoral journey. In 2014, he successfully earned his Ph.D., with his dissertation centered on "Unbinding Anthropological Magical Realism."

Choudhury, throughout his lifetime, authored numerous short stories and essays, complementing his literary legacy alongside his novel. Several of his contributions found inclusion in anthologies alongside acclaimed authors such as Salman Rushdie, Jhumpa Lahiri, Michael Ondaatje, and Anita Desai. His magnum opus, "Babu Bangladesh!," a project initiated in 2003–04, reached fruition in 2018, marking the culmination of his dedicated literary pursuits.

== Babu Bangladesh! ==
Choudhury's novel, released posthumously, has been hailed as one of the best works in English by a Bangladeshi author. Scroll said "what Babu Bangladesh! truly achieves is laying bare the polyphonic voices that make Bangladesh – voices so numerous and diverse, like Babu's own identity, that it is almost impossible to pin them down", while Mint columnist Sandipan Deb called it "Midnight's Children for that tumultuous nation". Huffington Post said Babu Bangladesh! had "traces of Umberto Eco meet the hallowed traditions of South American magical realism".

== Death ==
On September 9, 2018, while taking a walk along the Kama-Gawa river in Kyoto, Choudhury slipped and drowned in the river.
