= India Becoming =

2012 book by Akash Kapur

India Becoming is a book by author Akash Kapur. The book is an account of change and transformation in modern India. It was selected by The New Yorker and The New Republic as a Best Book of 2012, and Newsweek as one of its three Must Reads on Modern India.

== Brief Summary ==
India Becoming, by the Harvard University trained social anthropologist Akash Kapur, is an in-depth study of simple average people from a nondescript town in South India, their mundane life and their struggle to survive the vicissitudes of the burgeoning society that modernization has thrown their way. In this debut attempt, Kapur chose to go to such great lengths to depict the real-life stories and experiences of people that it took him five years to finish the book.

Kapur, in this book, expresses his views on the outcomes of rapid urbanization and its effects on people across different social strata, in both rural areas and major cities, including his hometown in Tamil Nadu and the cities of Mumbai, Bangalore, and Chennai. The book’s real-life characters reflect these themes in detail.

Born to an Indian father and American mother, Kapur's early life was spent in India. He left for US when he was 16 and started his academic years there. He came back to India in 2003 to settle down permanently. "I was coming home, but in many ways, it was to a home I didn't recognize anymore" says the one-time "Letter From India" columnist for the International Herald Tribune and The New York Times. A book of hybrid nonfiction, India Becoming presents an imagined geography of 2010s Delhi and India as experienced and created by an Indian returnee migrant author.

As Mendes and Lau argue, Kapur's text reflects "some of the enduring key themes involved in the reinvention and restoration of imagined geographies, such as assimilation vs alienation/anomie and tradition vs modernity." To quote an excerpt from his book: "Einstein once wrote of America that its people were "always becoming, never being", but it was in India now that I felt that sense of newness, of perpetual reinvention and forward momentum that I had felt when I first moved to America".
