= Rohini Mohan (journalist) =

Indian journalist and writer

Rohini Mohan is an Indian journalist and writer, currently working independently. In 2019, she was the recipient of the Chameli Devi Jain Award for Outstanding Women Mediaperson. Her first book, The Seasons of Trouble (2014) won the Shakti Bhatt Prize in 2015, and the Tata Literature Live! First Book Award.

== Career ==
Rohini Mohan is an independent journalist, who has reported for Indian and international publications, including The Economic Times, the New York Times, Al Jazeera, The Caravan, VICE News, TIME magazine, Harper's, Tehelka, The Hindu, Outlook India, The Wire, and Scroll.in. She reports on health, human rights, and politics in South Asia. Rohini Mohan has received several awards for her journalism, including the Chameli Devi Jain Award for Outstanding Women Mediaperson for "exceptional reportage from Assam on the events surrounding the controversy over the citizenship issue." in 2019. She has also won the 2012 International Committee of the Red Cross and the Indian Institute of Journalism Award for reporting on conflicts in Sri Lanka, in The Caravan.

In 2014, Rohini Mohan published a non-fiction account of the Sri Lankan conflict, The Seasons of Trouble (Verso Books). The book received generally positive reviews, with Tishani Doshi writing in The Hindu that it was a "remarkable book — epic in scale, utterly compelling in detail." and the Economist carrying a review that described it as a "thoroughly absorbing book." NPR included it on its Guide To 2014's Great Reads. The book won the Shakti Bhatt Prize in India as well as the Tata Literature Live! First Book Award.

== Personal life ==
Rohini Mohan was born in Thiruvananthapuram, Kerala. She received a Masters in Political Journalism from Columbia University, and a post-graduate diploma from the Asian College of Journalism.

== Awards and fellowships ==
Year	Award	Reference
2019	Chameli Devi Jain Award for Outstanding Women Mediaperson	
2015	Tata Literature Live! First Book Award for the book, The Seasons of Trouble	
2014	Shakti Bhatt Prize for the book, The Seasons of Trouble	
2014	Society of Authors, London Award	
2013	Charles Wallace India Trust Writing Fellowship	
2012	International Committee of the Red Cross and the Indian Institute of Journalism Award	

== Books ==
- The Seasons of Trouble (Verso Books, 2014)
- Mission Cycle (Pratham Books)
