= Mridula Koshy =

Mridula Susan Koshy
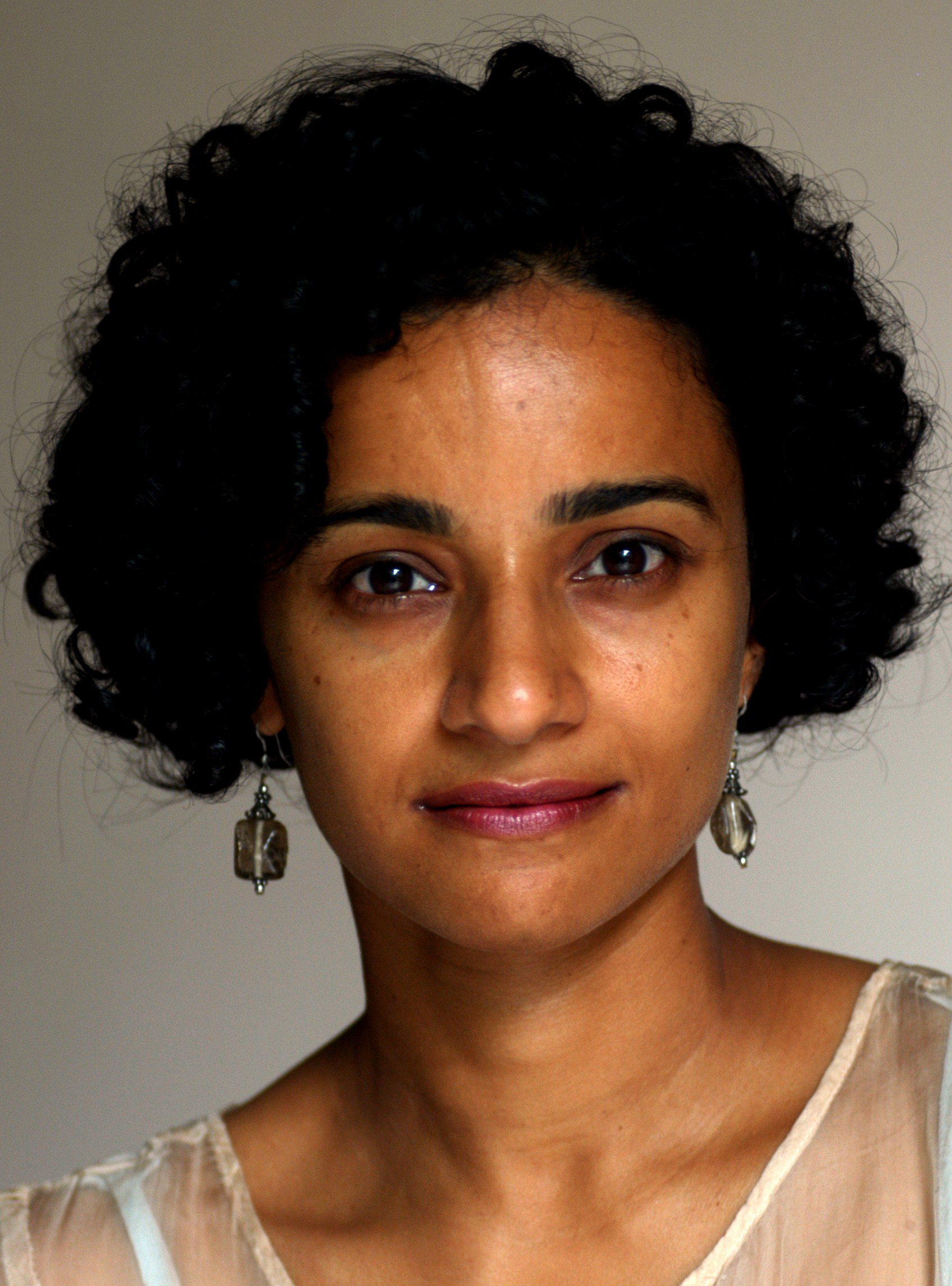
- Koshy in 2009
- Born: 1969 (age 56–57)
- Occupation: Writer
- Website: mridulakoshy.blogspot.ru

Mridula Susan Koshy (born 1969) is an Indian writer and free library movement activist. She lives in New Delhi with her three children.

== Professional life ==
Koshy was born in New Delhi and migrated to the US in the 1984, at the age of 14. She has worked as a trade union organiser and community organiser, parent and writer.

She returned to India in 2004 and currently works as a librarian and community organiser with The Community Library Project, which runs four free community libraries, which together serve over 4000 members in Delhi NCR.

Her writing about the free library movement can be read in Caravan Magazine, on the blog of TCLP, All About Book Publishing, Scroll, Yahoo News, and Goethe Institut India's website.

Her collection of short stories, If It Is Sweet won the 2009 Shakti Bhatt First Book Prize and was shortlisted for the 2009 Vodafone Crossword Book Award.

Her first novel, Not Only the Things That Have Happened (Harper Collins, 2012) was shortlisted for the 2013 Crossword Book Award.

Koshy's books often explore the lives of Delhi's working class. Her latest novel Bicycle Dreaming focuses on family life in a waste worker community in Delhi. It follows a 13-year-old girl named Noor, who dreams of owning a bicycle and working as a kabadiwala like her father. However, the loss of his job forces him to work as a ragpicker, adversely affecting her family.

Her stories have appeared in literary journals including Wasafiri, as well as in anthologies in India, the United Kingdom and Italy.

== Bibliography ==
- Bicycle Dreaming (Speaking Tiger, 2016)
- Not Only the Things That Have Happened (Harper Collins India, 2012)
- If It Is Sweet, a collection of short stories (Westland/Tranquebar Press, 2009; Brass Monkey, 2011)
- "Intimations of a Greater Truth" in Existere.
- "Romancing the Koodawallah" in Wasafiri, Summer 2008.
- "Stray Blades of Grass" in The Dalhousie Review, Autumn 2008.
- "Companion" in Prairie Fire.
- "Good Mother" in India Currents, winner first place, Katha 2008. (online text)
- "The Large Girl" in 21 Under Forty from Zubaan and Katha: Short Stories by Indian Women from Saqi, March 2007.
- "When the Child was a Child" in First Proof 3 from Penguin India, April 2008.
- "Jeans" in India from Isbn Edizioni.
- "Same Day" in Tehelka's first fiction special, December 2008 (online text).

== Reviews ==
- Review of Bicycle Dreaming in The Hindu, February 2016
- Review of Bicycle Dreaming in Hindustan Times, August 2016
- Review of Not Only The Things That Have Happened in India Today, January 2013
- Review of Not Only The Things That Have Happened in Sunday Guardian, February, 2013
- Review of Not Only The Things That Have Happened from People Magazine, May, 2-13
- Review of If It Is Sweet in Outlook Magazine, June 2009
- Review of If It Is Sweet, in Tehelka, June 2009
- Review of "The Large Girl" in The Hindu Literary Review, July 2007
- Review of "The Large Girl" in India Today, April 2007
