= Amitabh Mattoo =

Indian academic

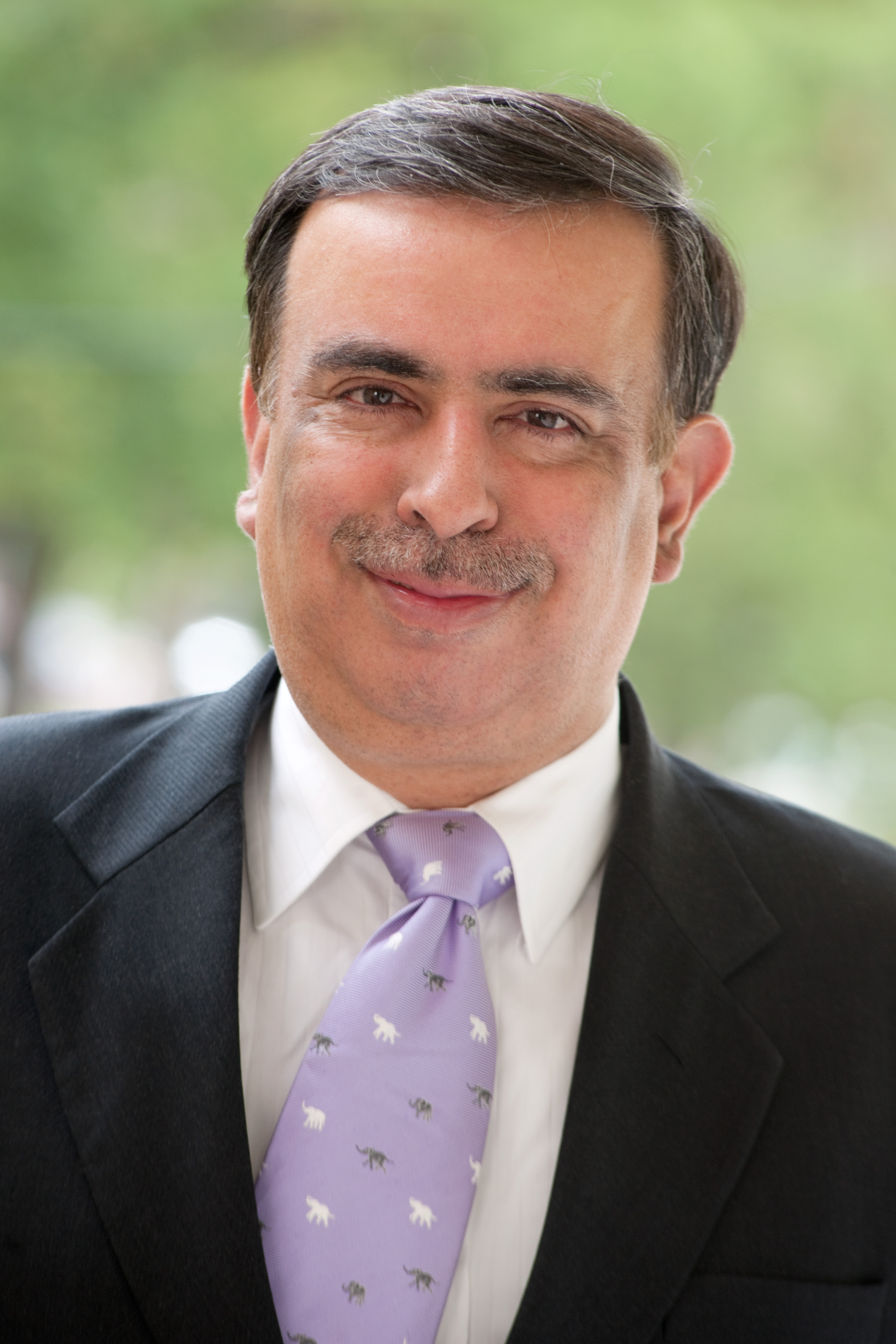
- Born: 26 June 1962 (age 64); Srinagar, Jammu and Kashmir, India
- Occupations: Academic, public intellectual, author,
- Website: https://www.amitabhmattoo.com

Amitabh Mattoo (born 26 June 1962, Srinagar) is an Indian academic, political scientist, public intellectual and writer specialising in international relations, political science, and contemporary history. He was awarded the Padma Shri by the Government of India in 2009 while serving as the Vice Chancellor of the University of Jammu. He is the Dean of the School of International Studies, Chair and a professor at Jawaharlal Nehru University, honorary professor of international relations at the University of Melbourne, and a Distinguished Fellow of the Australia India Institute. He concurrently holds the inaugural Chair of Excellence at the Defence Services Staff College at Wellington, Nilgiris. He is set to become Professor Emeritus at Jawaharlal Nehru University on 28 February 2027. He was the Vice Chancellor of the University of Jammu from 2002 to 2008 (when appointed, he was the youngest to serve as a Vice Chancellor of a public university in the history of independent India). He served as a cabinet-ranked Advisor to the Chief Minister of Jammu and Kashmir from 2015 to 2018. One of the few public intellectuals to bridge the gap between academia and policy, he has influenced policy making on nuclear issues, Jammu and Kashmir and the India-Pakistan conflict. His role in strengthening India’s relations with Australia have also been publicly acclaimed.

Following the abrogation of Article 370 of the Constitution of India, Mattoo offered a political roadmap detailing his vision for securing the future of Jammu and Kashmir. He has been an advocate of multiculturalism and of reconciliation between Kashmiri Pandits and Kashmiri Muslims.

== Personal life ==
A son of the academic and writer Neerja Mattoo and the forester and civil servant Rajendra Kumar Mattoo, Amitabh received his early education at the Burn Hall School in Srinagar before attending the Jawaharlal Nehru University in New Delhi. He married Ajita, a member of the 1987 batch of the Indian Railway Accounts Service. He qualified for the Indian Police Service in 1987 and the Indian Administrative Services (IAS) in 1988 through the Combined Civil Services Examination, but pursued a career in academics. He went on to earn a PhD in International Relations from the University of Oxford, writing a history of the campaign for nuclear disarmament. He describes the ten days of youth that he spent in Tihar jail as part of student protests at JNU as a 'life-shaping experience'.

Mattoo comes from the Kashmiri Pandit family of Srinagar. Before the land reforms in Jammu and Kashmir, his family consisted of some of the region's feudal landlords, aristocrats, and administrators. Examining the recent social history of his own ethnic group, Mattoo remarks:

Indeed, the intriguing history of the Kashmiri Pandit community is an anomaly in contemporary times that has privileged stories of ideological clashes, confronting cultures and competing nationalisms. Where else would you find an educated (with 100% literacy), mostly professional, materially successful, religiously liberal, politically flexible, totally non-violent, microscopic minority inhabiting one of the most conflicted and contested parts of the country? They lived, in retrospect, fairy-tale lives, and that charmed life turned into a nightmare in the 1990s.

== Career ==
The Executive Council of Jawaharlal Nehru University has selected Mattoo to be conferred the title of "Professor Emeritus". He will take voluntary retirement on 28 February 2027. Mattoo is Deputy Chair of the Academic Advisory Board of the German Institute for Global and Area Studies. He was the founding CEO of the Australia India Institute at the University of Melbourne and served as Chairman of the governing board of Miranda House, University of Delhi, the highest-ranked women's college in India; earlier, he had served as Chair of Kirori Mal College. Mattoo was among the few non-alumni ever appointed to Chair governing bodies of colleges affiliated with Delhi University. He has also been a member of the Lancet Commission on Adolescent Health and Wellbeing.

Mattoo has been a visiting professor at Stanford University, the University of Notre Dame, and the University of Illinois at Urbana-Champaign. He has been Chairperson of the Centre for International Politics, Organization and Disarmament at Jawaharlal Nehru University as well as Founding Director and CEO of the Australia India Institute, University of Melbourne and a member of the National Knowledge Commission, a high-level advisory group to the Prime Minister of India. He has also been a member of the advisory board of India's National Security Council, a member of the Indian Prime Minister's Task Force on Global Strategic Developments, on the executive committee and governing council of the Pugwash Conferences on Science and World Affairs, and a member of the Indian Prime Minister's High-Level Group on Nuclear Disarmament. He also co-chaired the Knowledge Initiative with the Education Minister of Jammu and Kashmir. The Knowledge Initiative was established by the state government to recommend interventions in schools, colleges, and institutions of higher learning to make the education system socially relevant and globally competitive.

Mattoo has published books on India's nuclear policy and India-Pakistan relations and has written on Kashmir. Mattoo has published twenty books and more than 100 research articles (including in top IR journals like Survival, International Affairs and Asian Survey). He regularly writes for Indian English-language newspapers such as The Telegraph and The Hindu, and has been a liberally inclined political commentator on national television. He has supervised 35 PhD thesis and over 60 M.Phil dissertations.

Mattoo became the youngest Vice-Chancellor of the University of Jammu in November 2002 and continued at this position until December 2008. As a patron of the arts, he was responsible for building a world-class auditorium in Jammu University, which also hosts an art gallery and a museum. Leading Indian artists, including the École nationale supérieure des Beaux-Arts-trained Bengali painter Jogen Chowdhury, have donated their work to the gallery. As president of the Jammu and Kashmir chapter of SPIC MACAY, Mattoo was responsible for the university becoming a nationally acclaimed centre of culture.

Mattoo was a member of the committee, appointed by the Governor of Jammu and Kashmir in 2008, which negotiated the Amarnath land transfer controversy, a series of political events that had led to uprisings in Jammu and Kashmir. On 26 June 2011, Jammu and Kashmir Chief Minister Omar Abdullah made an open offer to Mattoo to return to his home state and 'advise us' in his capacity as a noted political thinker and academic. On 21 August 2015, Mattoo was appointed as Advisor to the Chief Minister of Jammu and Kashmir.

For over a decade, he chaired the Chaophraya Track 2 Dialogue between India and Pakistan.

On 3 February 2011, in a meeting with India's Education Minister Kapil Sibal, Mattoo declined to be the Founding Vice-Chancellor of the Central University of Jammu – for which he had been selected by a search committee of eminent academics and approved by the President of India – citing personal reasons. Earlier, he was in the shortlist of three for the Vice-Chancellorship of Jawaharlal Nehru University. On 1 March 2011, the University of Melbourne appointed Mattoo as the inaugural director of the Australia India Institute. The chairman of the institute's Board, University of Melbourne Chancellor the Hon. Alex Chernov AO QC (erstwhile Governor of Victoria) announced: "We are delighted to have as Director a person of world-renowned academic and administrative calibre such as Professor Mattoo. He has a wealth of experience in areas concerned with university affairs, government, and other institutions." Mattoo also serves as Professor of International Relations in the Faculty of Arts at the University of Melbourne.

On 27 May 2025, he was appointed to the first Chair of Excellence at the Defence Services Staff College, Wellington Until 19 June 2018, he served as Advisor to the Chief Minister of Jammu and Kashmir, with the status of a Cabinet Minister. Amitabh Mattoo was the Vice Chancellor of the University of Jammu between the year 2002 to 2008 and he is known to be the youngest Vice Chancellor of a public university, then, to be appointed to that position in the history of independent India.

Mattoo advocates greater economic and political cooperation between Australia and India. In January 2020, he wrote: "After more than six decades characterised by misperception, lack of trust, neglect, missed opportunities and even hostility, a new chapter in India’s relations with Australia has well and truly begun. Consider this: in 1955, Prime Minister Robert Menzies decided that Australia should not take part in the Bandung Afro-Asian conference. By distancing Australia from the ‘new world’, Menzies (who would later confess that Occidentals did not understand India) alienated Indians, offended Prime Minister Jawaharlal Nehru, and left Australia unsure for decades about its Asian identity. India and Australia should bring this chequered past to a close, and herald a new united front for the Indo-Pacific."

== Awards and honours ==
Recognizing his contribution to education and public life, the President of India honoured Mattoo on the occasion of the Republic Day (2008) with the Padma Shri, India's fourth-highest civilian award. This was the first time a Vice-chancellor in Jammu and Kashmir had been so honoured.

Mattoo was awarded the Qimpro Platinum Standard Award (2008) and was recognised as a 'national statesman' for his work in the field of education, along with Anand Mahindra, who was awarded for his leadership in business.

In 2016, Mattoo was awarded a Doctor of Laws (Honoris Causa) degree by the Hindustan Institute of Technology and Science, Tamil Nadu; and in 2018, the Capital Foundation Award for being an 'outstanding educationist'.

Mattoo has also received several awards for his contribution to India-Australia relations, including the Asoka Award,, and was on 4 June 2025 declared a "Hero" of the "Comprehensive Strategic Partnership " by the Australian High Commissioner, Philip Green, during the visit of the Australian Deputy Prime Minister, Richard Marles.

On March 31, 2025, the Kashmir Education, Culture, and Science Society awarded Prof Amitabh Mattoo the "MK Kaw Memorial Award 2025".

The Standing Committee on External Affairs of the Indian Parliament has invited Mattoo as an expert witness to better inform its proceedings.
