= DSC Prize for South Asian Literature =

South Asian literary award

- Logo
- Awarded for: Original full-length novel inspired by South Asia, written in English, or translated into English by any writer across the globe.
- Sponsored by: Surina Narula & Manhad Narula
- Reward: US$25,000
- First award: 2011
- Final award: 2019
- Website: http://dscprize.com

The DSC Prize for South Asian Literature is an international literary prize awarded annually to writers of any ethnicity or nationality writing about South Asia themes such as culture, politics, history, or people. It is for an original full-length novel written in English, or translated into English.

The award is for novels published in the year preceding the judging of the prize. The winner receives 25,000 USD. The DSC Prize was instituted by Surina Narula and Manhad Narula in 2010. Its stated purpose is to showcase the best writing about the South Asian region and bring it to a global audience. Only the writers from South Asian Countries are honored for their work. The South Asian countries in focus include the following: Nepal, Bhutan, Myanmar, Bangladesh, Sri Lanka, India, Pakistan, and Afghanistan. The 2020 edition was delayed due to the COVID-19 pandemic. Although the tenth edition was announced for 2021, the DSC Prize for South Asian Literature has not been awarded since 2019.

== Winners and shortlist ==
| Year | Winning author | Winning work (publisher) | Runners-up | Refs. |
|---|---|---|---|---|
| 2011 | H. M. Naqvi | Home Boy (HarperCollins India) | Amit Chaudhuri, The Immortals (Picador India); Musharraf Ali Farooqi, The Story of a Widow (Picador India); Tania James, Atlas of Unknowns (Pocket Books); Manju Kapur, The Immigrant (Faber & Faber); Neel Mukherjee, A Life Apart (Constable & Robinson) | |
| 2012 | Shehan Karunatilaka | Chinaman (Random House, India) | U. R. Ananthamurthy, Bharathipura (Oxford University Press, India; translated by Susheela Punitha); Chandrakanta, A Street in Srinagar (Zubaan Books, India; translated by Manisha Chaudhry); Usha K.R, Monkey-man (Penguin/Penguin India); Tabish Khair, The Thing About Thugs (Fourth Estate/HarperCollins India); Kavery Nambisan, The Story That Must Not Be Told (Viking/Penguin India) | |
| 2013 | Jeet Thayil | Narcopolis (Faber and Faber, London) | Jamil Ahmad, The Wandering Falcon (Hamish Hamilton/Penguin India); Tahmima Anam, The Good Muslim (Penguin Books); Amitav Ghosh, River of Smoke (Hamish Hamilton/Penguin India); Mohammed Hanif, Our Lady of Alice Bhatti (Random House India); Uday Prakash, The Walls of Delhi (Translated by Jason Grunebaum; UWA Publishing, W. Australia) | |
| 2014 | Cyrus Mistry | Chronicle of a Corpse Bearer (Aleph Book Company, India) | Anand, Book of Destruction (Translated by Chetana Sachidanandan; Penguin India); Benyamin, Goat Days (Translated by Joseph Koyippalli; Penguin India); Mohsin Hamid, How to Get Filthy Rich in Rising Asia (Hamish Hamilton/Penguin India); Nadeem Aslam, The Blind Man's Garden (Random House, India); Nayomi Munaweera, Island of a Thousand Mirrors (Perera Hussein Publishing, Sri Lanka) | |
| 2015 | Jhumpa Lahiri | The Lowland (Vintage Books/Random House, India) | Bilal Tanweer, The Scatter Here Is Too Great (Vintage Books/Random House, India); Kamila Shamsie, A God in Every Stone (Bloomsbury, India); Romesh Gunesekera, Noontide Toll (Hamish Hamilton/Penguin, India); Shamsur Rahman Faruqi, The Mirror of Beauty (Penguin Books, India) | |
| 2016 | Anuradha Roy | Sleeping on Jupiter (Hachette, India) | Akhil Sharma, Family Life (Faber & Faber, UK); K. R. Meera, Hang Woman (Translated by J Devika; Penguin, India); Mirza Waheed, The Book of Gold Leaves (Viking/Penguin India); Neel Mukherjee, The Lives of Others (Vintage/Penguin Random House, UK); Raj Kamal Jha, She Will Build Him a City (Bloomsbury, India) | |
| 2017 | Anuk Arudpragasam | The Story of a Brief Marriage (Granta Books, UK) | Anjali Joseph, The Living (Fourth Estate, HarperCollins, UK); Aravind Adiga, Selection Day (Fourth Estate, HarperCollins, India); Karan Mahajan, The Association of Small Bombs (Chatto & Windus, UK & Viking, USA & Fourth Estate, HarperCollins, India); Stephen Alter, In the Jungles of the Night (Aleph Book Company, India) | |
| 2018 | Jayanth Kaikini | No Presents Please (Translated by Tejaswini Niranjana, HarperCollins India) | Kamila Shamsie, Home Fire (Riverhead Books, USA and Bloomsbury, UK); Manu Joseph, Miss Laila Armed And Dangerous (Fourth Estate, HarperCollins, India); Mohsin Hamid, Exit West (Riverhead Books, USA and Hamish Hamilton, Penguin Random House, India); Neel Mukherjee, A State of Freedom (Chatto & Windus, Vintage, UK and Hamish Hamilton, Penguin Random House, India); Sujit Saraf, Harilal & Sons (Speaking Tiger, India) | |
| 2019 | Amitabha Bagchi | Half the Night Is Gone (Juggernaut Books, India) | Jamil Jan Kochai, 99 Nights in Logar (Bloomsbury Circus, Bloomsbury, India & UK, and Viking, Penguin Random House, USA); Madhuri Vijay, The Far Field (Grove Press, Grove Atlantic, USA); Manoranjan Byapari, There's Gunpowder in the Air (Translated from Bengali by Arunava Sinha, Eka, Amazon Westland, India); Raj Kamal Jha, The City and the Sea (Hamish Hamilton, Penguin Random House, India); Sadia Abbas, The Empty Room (Zubaan Publishers, India) | |
