= Past continuous =

Past continuous may refer to:

- Past continuous or past progressive, an English verb form (e.g. was writing)
- Verb forms with similar meaning in some other languages; see Imperfect
- Past Continuous, a novel by Yaakov Shabtai
- A Life Apart (novel), titled Past Continuous in its original release as a novel by Neel Mukherjee released in 2008

== See also ==
- Past tense
- Continuous and progressive aspects
