= Personal Days =

Novel by Ed Park

- 2008 Random House book jacket
- Author: Ed Park
- Subject: Workplace humor
- Genre: Satire, Literary fiction
- Set in: New York City
- Publisher: Random House, New York., Jonathan Cape and Vintage Books, London,
- Publication date: 2008, 2009
- Publication place: United States, United Kingdom.
- Media type: Print, eBook
- Pages: 241
- Awards: 2008 shortlisted for First Novel Prize from the Center for Fiction. 2009 finalist for the PEN/Hemingway Award.
- ISBN: 9780812978575
- OCLC: 173659698
- Website: Official website

Personal Days is the first novel written by Ed Park. It was published by Random House in 2008. The novel satirizes the work life of office cubicle employees, including the specter of getting laid off or surviving.

== Plot ==
This novel is about a group of eight office workers in New York City as their company has a financial crisis. The first part of the story is told from the perspective of these eight employees, who act as a collective narrator. With humor, the novel depicts their focused attempts to cope with the threat of job loss that is ever present, while at the same time, most of them dislike their jobs.

== Connections ==
According to McClatchy News, upon its release this book was compared to Joshua Ferris' notable novel, Then We Came to the End. Both novels apply a first-person plural narrator to demonstrate the absurd nature of office life. Ferris' book was published six months before Park's. Personal Days, "is a little leaner, a little more antic, even a little more experimental, as evidenced by the final section of the novel." McClatchy News also says that Thomas Ligotti's book, My Work is Not Yet Done has the opposite, a sinister and dark plot.

Kirkus Reviews alludes to the films Office Space and Mr. Brooks in its review of this novel.

== Awards ==
in the 2008 this novel was shortlisted for the First Novel Prize from the Center for Fiction. This book was also a finalist for the PEN/Hemingway Award in 2009.

== Reception ==
Mark Servas of The New York Times says that "Unmoored from the details of their daily toil, the large cast becomes hard to differentiate throughout the first two-thirds of the book." Servas also says that "Park has written what one of his characters calls "a layoff narrative" for our times... We need as many as we can get right now."

Kirkus Reviews says that "Park is very good at capturing the frustrations, fears and small pleasures flourishing amid the cubicles... [However,] he undermines this accomplishment, though, when he gives his story a villain—an evil madman, no less—rather than letting the bad guy be the office itself.

== See also ==
- Americana by Don DeLillo
