= Neel Mukherjee =

Neel Mukherjee may refer to:

- Neel Mukherjee (actor), Indian actor
- Neel Mukherjee (writer), Indian writer
