= Jamil Jan Kochai =

Afghan-American writer

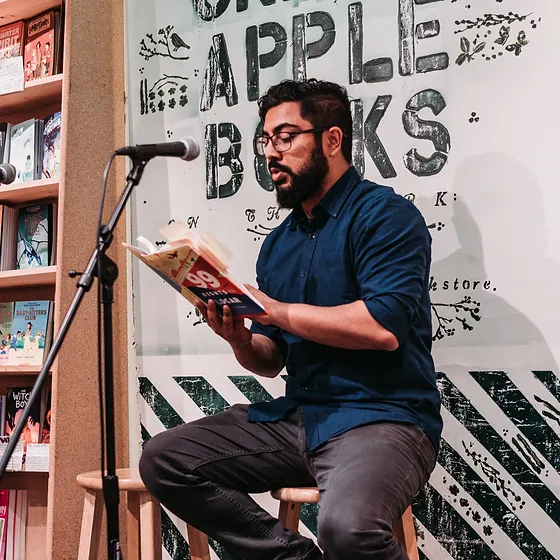
- Born: 1992 (age 33–34); Pakistan
- Education: California State University, Sacramento; University of California, Davis; Iowa Writers' Workshop
- Occupation: Writer
- Writing career
- Notable awards: John C. Zacharis First Book Award (2021)

Jamil Jan Kochai (born 1992) is an Afghan-American writer who was born in Peshawar, Pakistan and resides in Sacramento, California. He is a O. Henry Award winner with two published books of fiction.

== Early life and education ==
Kochai was born in Pakistan and brought to the United States as a baby, and was raised in California. His first language is Pashto and his family also speaks Persian. After 9/11, he was bullied, and at 12, his family traveled to Afghanistan, which served as inspiration for his first book.

While growing up in West Sacramento, California, a teacher at River City High School encouraged him to take a creative writing class, leading him into fiction. He continued to write as he worked toward a bachelor's degree at California State University, Sacramento, majoring in English. He received two master's degrees in creative writing, first from University of California, Davis in 2017 and then from the Iowa Writers' Workshop in 2019, where he was a Truman Capote Fellow.

== Career ==
His first book, a novel titled 99 Nights in Logar, was published by Viking Press in 2019 and was a finalist for the 2020 PEN/Hemingway Award for Debut Novel and shortlisted for the 2019 DSC Prize for South Asian Literature. The debut won the John C. Zacharis First Book Award from Ploughshares. It was reviewed as "funny" and "razor-sharp" with a "singular, resonant voice" by Dina Nayeri in The New York Times Book Review and called it "charming and unpredictable" by The Guardian, as well as "phenomenal" by Mohammed Hanif. It was named a book to read by BuzzFeed, Time, The New Yorker, and New York, and Harper's Magazine wrote that the "funny" and "surreal" book is "driven by a profusion of tales within tales."

Kochai stated that Islamic texts and literature were an important influence on the book. It borrowed from the structure of The Arabian Nights. A part of the book is in Pashto without translation, which he said was because he "wanted to upset this notion that, in order for this story to have value, it needed to be made consumable for an English readership."

In 2022, Kochai published a short story collection, his second book, called The Haunting of Hajji Hotak and Other Stories from Penguin Random House. It was characterised by one reviewer as "a masterful collection underpinned by an understanding of the lack of distinction between the personal and political". In an interview with The New Yorker, he stated that the title story, published in the magazine after being inspired by a headline from The Onion, represents many themes in the collection. In an earlier interview with The New Yorker, Kochai discussed writing a story based on a video game set in Afghanistan called Metal Gear Solid V: The Phantom Pain.

In 2023, he announced that he would begin a job as assistant professor at Princeton University.

His stories have been published in Ploughshares, A Public Space, and The Sewanee Review.

== Bibliography ==
=== Novels ===
- Kochai, Jamil Jan (2019). 99 Nights in Logar. New York: Viking.

=== Short fiction ===
Collections

- Kochai, Jamil Jan (2022). The Haunting of Hajji Hotak and Other Stories.

Stories (Note: Short stories unless otherwise noted.)

Title	Year	First published	Reprinted/collected	Notes
Playing Metal Gear Solid V: The Phantom Pain	2020	The New Yorker, January 6, 2020	The Best American Short Stories 2021	
The Haunting of Hajji Hotak	2021	The New Yorker, November 1, 2021	The Haunting of Hajji Hotak and Other Stories (2022)	
Occupational hazards	2022	Kochai, Jamil Jan (May 23, 2022). "Occupational hazards". The New Yorker. 98 (13): 50–55.		

———————
