= The Lives of Others (novel) =

2014 novel by Neel Mukherjee

- Author: Neel Mukherjee
- Language: English
- Publisher: Chatto & Windus (UK); W. W. Norton (US)
- Publication date: 22 May 2014 (UK); 1 October 2014 (US)
- Publication place: India
- Media type: Print (Hardback)
- Pages: 528 pp (UK hardback edition)
- ISBN: 978-0-7011-8629-6

The Lives of Others is a novel by Neel Mukherjee. It was published in 2014 by Chatto & Windus in the UK and W. W. Norton & Company in the US. The novel, the author's second one, was shortlisted for the 2014 Man Booker Prize on 9 September 2014. Bookbinder Tom McEwan was commissioned to make a custom binding for the book at the ceremony at the Guildhall.

The novel is set in Calcutta (Kolkata) in the 1960s and follows a wealthy business family, one of whose members gets involved in extremist political activism. The book deals with the chasm between generations, and is set against a backdrop in which the gulf between the poor and the wealthy has never been wider.

== Writing ==
The novel is split into two interlacing narratives, typeset in different fonts. One is an epistolary account of a violent agrarian movement through the eyes of Ghosh family scion Supratik, who has left his home to mobilise the oppressed peasants against corrupt moneylenders and landlords. The other is a third-person account around the Ghosh family, which forms the bulk of the book. The story touches briefly on notable moments of the city's history such as the Bengal famine of 1943, the Great Calcutta Killings of 1946, and the Partition of India. Most of the action takes place in the years 1968–72.

Like many other Indian novels in English, the text includes Bengali words and phrases. A family tree and a guide to Bengali relational terms is provided.

The tension between classes is at the core of the novel. The Statesman described the book to have a neo-orientalist agenda.

Describing the unexpected ease with which he wrote the novel, Mukherjee said:

"Writers rarely have access to that part of their heads where books originate. One can talk cogently of influences, plotting, putting a book together, structuring, editing, everything, really, but origins are a far cloudier issue, the domain of the unconscious, mostly, so not readily available for truthful discussion.... I don't know whether my book started life as the story of a joint family in Calcutta at a critical juncture in history or as a reckoning with an ultra-left movement for social justice and equality around which the domestic story was built.... That way of talking about a book as which narrative came first is always already too late because the origins lie far earlier.... It was as if the book had already been there, waiting patiently to be let in; I only had to open the door."

== Reviews ==
The Lives of Others was favourably reviewed by novelists including Amitav Ghosh, A S Byatt, Anita Desai and Patrick Flanery.

Critics praised the novel's intricate and detailed portrayal of middle-class Bengali life during the period. In a glowing review for The Guardian, A S Byatt complimented the author's capacity to imagine the lives of others.

Reviewing for The Independent, Patrick Gale noted the author's taste for violent contrasts and narratives within narratives. The New York Times likened Mukherjee with Tolstoy in his ability "to bring to life a diverse and expansive set of characters and to sharply evoke their interior worlds." For The New York Review of Books, Anita Desai noted the eye for detail, as in Victorian novel, and in terms of theme, compared the book with Rabindranath Tagore's 1915 novel The Home and the World which depicts an altruistic aristocrat along with a villainous revolutionary. Reviewing for The Telegraph, Patrick Flanery wrote favourably of the well-observed and psychologically nuanced scenes of collective family. Il Sole 24 Ore likened the novel to Buddenbrooks (1901).

In 2020, The Independent's Emma Lee-Potter listed The Lives of Others as one of the 12 best Indian novels.

== Awards and honours ==
- 2014 Man Booker Prize shortlist
- 2014 Encore Award winner
- 2014 Costa Book Award for Novel shortlist
- 2016 DSC Prize for South Asian Literature shortlist
