= The Unnamed =

2010 novel by Joshua Ferris

- First edition (US)
- Author: Joshua Ferris
- Language: English
- Publisher: Reagan Arthur (US); Penguin (UK)
- Publication date: 2010 (US), 2011 (UK)
- Publication place: United States
- Media type: Print
- Pages: 313
- ISBN: 0-316-03401-0

The Unnamed is the second novel by American novelist Joshua Ferris, published in 2010.

== Plot summary ==
The story begins in New York City where Tim Farnsworth, a successful trial attorney and partner in a law firm, apparently with everything going for him, happily married with a teenage daughter, is struck by an uncontrollable urge to walk, and keep walking. He seeks medical and psychiatric help but his illness, which comes in episodes normally months apart, cannot be explained. He tries to keep his job and family together but this becomes increasingly difficult, until in the end he walks out on both.

== Reception ==
- Tim Adams of The Guardian describes the novel as "somewhat unnerving", but concludes positively "The result is a kind of existential journey that is not wholly removed from Cormac McCarthy's The Road, though Ferris has none of McCarthy's apocalypticism, just a mundane and original understanding that whatever we might tell ourselves to the contrary, our biology will sooner or later remove us from the things we hold most dear".
- Tim Martin in The Daily Telegraph writes "The Unnamed can be tough to read because of the skill Ferris brings to his evocation of suffering, particularly in its final pitiless chapters, but it is clearly an important and individual work, a stage in the development of a significant talent."
- Jay McInerney in The New York Times complains that "Tim’s travels don’t really take him anywhere, literally or figuratively, until finally he makes a concerted effort to return to New York ... to return to Jane, who is dying of cancer. When he visits her in the hospital in between walks, she is astonished to find how little he notices on his travels. He finally starts to observe the world around him so that he can share the details with her, but for this reader, it’s too little, way too late ... As a fan of Then We Came to the End I can admire Ferris’s earnest attempt to reinvent himself, but I can’t wait for him to return to the kind of thing at which he excels"
- Robert Epstein in The Independent was also negative saying that a reader "might be forgiven for wondering why it is they have just read 300-plus pages – unless they enjoy a good existential disquisition on despair, of course".
