= A Life Apart =

A Life Apart can refer to:

- A Life Apart: Hasidism in America, a 1997 PBS documentary film
- A Life Apart (novel), a 2008 novel by Indian writer Neel Mukherjee

== See also ==
- The Life Apart, a 2024 drama film
