= Bagchi =

Origin
- Origin: Bengali Hindu
- Region of origin: Barendra, Bengal

Bagchi (Bengali: বাগচী), is a surname found primarily among the Bengali Brahmin caste of the Indian state of West Bengal and Bangladesh. The surname belongs to the Barendra sect of Bengali Kulin Brahmins.

== Notable people with the surname ==
- Jatindramohan Bagchi (1878–1948), Bengali poet
- Subroto Bagchi (born 1957), Indian entrepreneur
- Tanishk Bagchi, Indian composer
- Biman Bagchi, Indian scientist
- Amiya Kumar Bagchi, Indian economist
- Rupankar Bagchi, Indian Bengali-language singer
- Amitabha Bagchi, Indian professor, Department of Computer Science and Engineering, IIT Delhi
- Jasodhara Bagchi, Indian author
- Amitabha Bagchi, Indian author
