= Tom McEwan (bookbinder) =

- Born: Irvine, Scotland
- Education: The Glasgow School of Art
- Known for: Bookbinding
- Website: www.mcewan.co.uk

Tom McEwan is a Scottish master craftsman and fine bookbinder.

== Life and work ==
Born in Irvine, North Ayrshire, in 1976, he enrolled at The Glasgow School of Art, studying sculpture in the Fine Art Department, graduating in 1980 alongside contemporary Sandy Stoddart.

In 2005 he retrained as a bookbinder, enrolling at a course at the Glasgow College of Building and Printing, gaining his Licentiate from Designer Bookbinders in 2010. His binding of Faust by Goethe was the winner of the National Library of Scotland's Elizabeth Souter Award in 2007, having previously won the Student award in 2006. In 2011, he was announced as the winner of the Society of Bookbinders 'John Coleman' trophy for best book in the 2011 International Competition.

For the Designer Bookbinders Award in 2013, his binding of The Rubáiyát of Omar Khayyám was awarded the prestigious Mansfield Medal for best book, as well as The Clothworkers’ Prize for the Open Choice Book, The Gioconda Smile by Aldous Huxley.

For the 2014 Man Booker Prize, he was commissioned to create a custom bookbinding for the shortlisted novel The Lives of Others by Neel Mukherjee. He was elected as a Fellow of the Designer Bookbinders in 2014, with his work currently held in various national and private collections.

== Collaborations ==
Tom McEwan also works with artists from other disciplines, such as fellow Courtyard Studios artist Alex Boyd with whom he set up The Dusk Press in 2014.
