= Cyrus Mistry (writer) =

Indian author and playwright

Cyrus Mistry (born 11 March 1956) is an Indian author and playwright. He won the 2014 DSC Prize for South Asian Literature for Chronicle of a Corpse Bearer. He is the brother of author Rohinton Mistry.

Mistry is from Mumbai. He began writing at a young age as a playwright, but has also worked as a journalist and short-story writer. His first short was published in 1979. He has also written short film scripts and several documentaries. One of his short stories, "Percy", was made into the Gujarati feature film Percy in 1989; he wrote the screenplay and dialogue. It won the National Award for Best Gujarati Film in 1989, as well as a Critics' Award at the Mannheim Film Festival.

His play Doongaji House is "regarded as a seminal work in contemporary Indian theatre in English." His first novel was The Radiance of Ashes which was shortlisted for the Crossword Prize (2005). His second novel was Chronicle of a Corpse Bearer published in 2013, which tells the story of the Khandhias within the Parsi community who carry the bodies of the dead to the Towers of Silence where they are eaten by vultures.

== Awards and honors ==
- Sultan Padamsee Award for Doongaji House
- 1989 National Award for Best Gujarati Film, Percy, story, screenplay and dialogue
- 2005 Crossword Book Award, shortlist, The Radiance of Ashes
- 2014 DSC Prize for South Asian Literature, Chronicle of a Corpse Bearer
- 2015 Sahitya Akademi Award

== Works ==
- Doongaji House (1977; play)
- The Radiance of Ashes (2005; novel)
- Chronicle of a Corpse Bearer (2012; novel)
- Passion Flower: Seven Stories of Derangement (2014; short stories)
- The Prospect of Miracles (2019; novel)
- Doongaji House: Selected Plays (2023; anthology)
