= J (novel) =

2014 novel by Howard Jacobson

- Author: Howard Jacobson
- Language: English
- Publisher: Jonathan Cape
- Publication date: 14 Aug 2014
- Media type: Hardcover
- Pages: 326
- ISBN: 978-0-2241-0197-4

J is a 2014 novel by Howard Jacobson. It was shortlisted for the 2014 Man Booker Prize.
