= Nadeem Aslam =

British Pakistani novelist (born 1966)

FRSL Nadeem Aslam
- ندیم اسلم
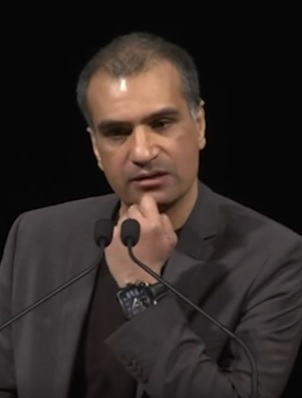
- Aslam in 2016
- Born: 11 June 1966 (age 60); Gujranwala, Pakistan
- Citizenship: Pakistani, British
- Education: University of Manchester (Drop-out)
- Occupation: Writer
- Writing career
- Period: 1993––present
- Genres: Novel, Essay
- Notable works: Maps for Lost Lovers; The Blind Man's Garden; The Golden Legend
- Notable awards: Betty Trask Award; 1994; Author's Club First Novel Award; 1993; Encore Award; 2005; Kiriyama Prize; 2005; Windham–Campbell Literature Prize; 2014
- Literary movement: Realism, Postmodernism, Imagism, Postcolonialism

Nadeem Aslam FRSL (born 11 July 1966 in Gujranwala, Pakistan) is a British Pakistani novelist. His debut novel, Season of the Rainbirds, won the Betty Trask and the Author's Club First Novel Award. His critically acclaimed second novel Maps for Lost Lovers won Encore Award and Kiriyama Prize; it was shortlisted for International Dublin Literary Award, among others. Colm Tóibín described him as "one of the most exciting and serious British novelists writing now".

His most recent book is The Golden Legend (2017).

== Early life ==
Nadeem Aslam moved with his family to the UK aged 14 when his father, a Communist, fled President Zia's regime. The family settled in Huddersfield, West Yorkshire. He later studied biochemistry at the University of Manchester, but left in his third year to become a writer.

== Career ==
At 13, Aslam published his first short story in Urdu in a Pakistani newspaper.

His 1993 debut novel, Season of the Rainbirds, set in rural Pakistan, won the Betty Trask and the Author's Club First Novel Award. Salman Rushdie described it as 'One of the most impressive first novels of the recent years'.

His next novel, 2004's Maps for Lost Lovers, is set in the midst of an immigrant Pakistani community in an English town in the north. The novel took him more than a decade to complete and won the Encore Award and Kiriyama Prize. It was long-listed for the Man Booker Prize.

Aslam's third novel, The Wasted Vigil, was published by Alfred A. Knopf in September 2008. It is set in Afghanistan. He travelled to Afghanistan during the writing of the book; but had never visited the country before writing the first draft. On 11 February 2011, it was short-listed for the Warwick Prize for Writing

Aslam's fourth novel is The Blind Man's Garden (2013). It is set in Western Pakistan and Eastern Afghanistan and looks at the war on terror through the eyes of local, Islamist characters. It contains also a love story loosely based on the traditional Punjabi romance of Heer Ranjha. The Blind Man's Garden was shortlisted for the Ondaatje Prize 2014, which is given by the Royal Society of Literature.

He has mentioned Vasko Popa, Ivan V. Lalić, Czesław Miłosz, Wisława Szymborska, Herman Melville, John Berger, VS Naipaul, Michael Ondaatje, and Bruno Schulz. as the writers that he admires.

His writings have been compared to those by Chinua Achebe, Chimamanda Ngozi Adichie and Kiran Desai. Aslam received an Encore in 2005. He writes his drafts in longhand and prefers extreme isolation when working.

He was made a fellow of the Royal Society of Literature in 2012.

== Bibliography ==
- Season of the Rainbirds (1993)
- Maps for Lost Lovers (2004)
- The Wasted Vigil (2008)
- Leila in the Wilderness (short story) published in Granta 112 (2010)
- The Blind Man's Garden (2013)
- The Golden Legend (2017)
- Punnu's Jihad (Granta Magazine)

== Awards ==
- For Season of the Rainbirds
  - Betty Trask Award 1994
  - The Author's Club First Novel Award 1993
  - The Mail on Sunday/John Llewellyn Rhys Prize (shortlist) 1994
  - The Whitbread First Novel Award (shortlist) 1994
- For Maps for Lost Lovers
  - The Encore Award 2005
  - The Kiriyama Pacific Rim Book Prize 2005
  - British Book Awards Decibel Writer of the Year (shortlist) 2006
  - International Dublin Literary Award (shortlist) 2006
  - Man Booker Prize (long-list) 2004
- For The Blind Man's Garden
  - DSC Prize for South Asian Literature (shortlist) 2014
  - Ondaatje Prize (shortlist)
- For The Golden Legend
  - Jhalak Prize (shortlist) 2018
- For literary achievement
  - 2014 Windham–Campbell Literature Prize (Fiction), valued at $150,000 one of the largest prizes in the world of its kind.
