= Uday Prakash =

Indian journalist and author (born 1952)

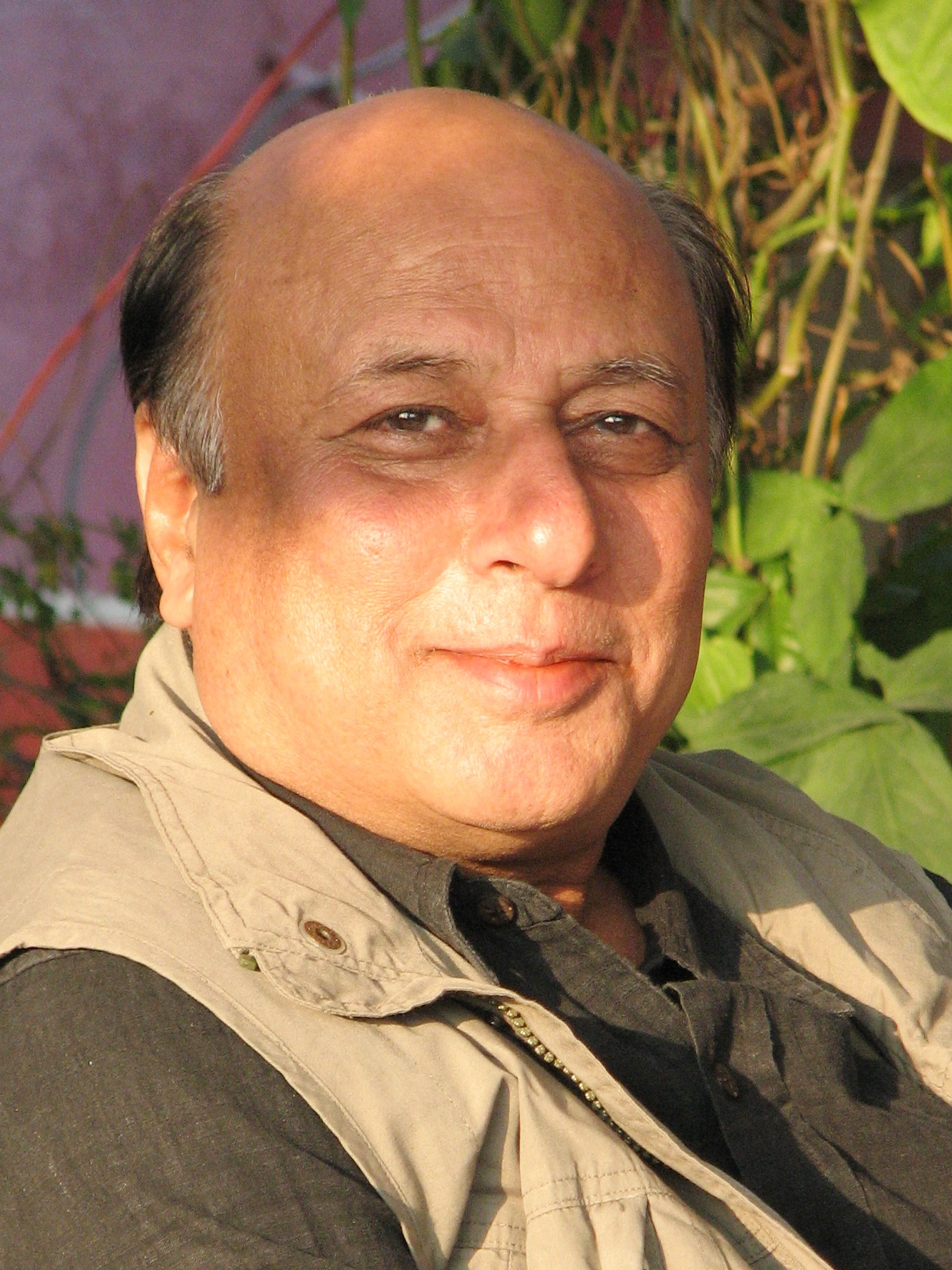
- Born: 1 January 1952 (age 74); Anuppur, Madhya Pradesh, India
- Education: M.A., BSc
- Writing career
- Genres: Novels, poetry, translation articles, TV and films

Uday Prakash (born 1 January 1952) is a Hindi poet, scholar, journalist, translator and short story writer from India. He has worked as administrator, editor, researcher, and TV director. He writes for major dailies and periodicals as a freelancer. He has also received several awards for his collection of short stories and poems. With Mohan Das he received Sahitya Academi Awards in 2011. He is the first author to return his Sahitya Akademi award on September 3, 2015 against the killing of M. M. Kalburgi that initiated a storm of national protests by writers, artists, scholars and intellectuals.

== Personal life ==
=== Background ===
Prakash was born on 1 January 1952, in the backward village of Sitapur, Anuppur, Madhya Pradesh, India. He was raised by and given primary education there by a teacher. He graduated in Science and obtained his master's degree in Hindi Literature, receiving a Gold Medal from Saugar University in 1974. From 1975 to 1976, he was a research student at Jawaharlal Nehru University (JNU); He was imprisoned as a passionate communist party member. He later lost interest in political ideology.

== Career ==
In 1978 Prakash taught as an assistant professor at JNU, and its Imphal Center for Post Graduate Studies. In 1980 he left academia, to become Officer-on-Special-Duty with the Madhya Pradesh Department of Culture. At the same time, he was Controlling Officer of the Bhopal Rabindra Bhawan, and assistant editor of Poorvagraha, a journal of Hindi literary criticism. (He was later critical of the Hindi literary establishment including Ashok Vajpeyi, who he worked for at Poorvagraha.)

From 1982 to 1990, Prakash worked in New Delhi newspapers; first as a subeditor of the Hindi news weekly Dinmaan, and later as Assistant Editor of the Sunday Mail. In 1987 becoming assistant professor at the School of Social Journalism (on deputation). In 1990 he joined ITV, (Independent Television), and became head of the PTI TV Concept and Script Department. Since 1993, he has been a full-time freelance writer.

Prakash was the editor of the monthly English language magazine "Eminence" (published in Bangalore) until April 2000.

He also participated in the international poetry festivals and seminars.

He has also made documentary films with Sahitya Akademi, like on Dharamvir Bharti. Prakash returned his Sahitya Akademi award in 2015, to protest the murder of rationalist academic M. M. Kalburgi.

== Bibliography ==
Peelee Chhatri Wali Ladki (2001) is Prakash's best known, and longest continuous story. Often called a "novella", Prakash calls it "a long short story" – Cheeni Baba will be his "first novel". His 2006 novella Mohan Das has been translated into English, seven Indian languages, and adapted by the author for the "Mohandas" screenplay (2009).

Poetry collections

- Suno kārīgara (1980), Abootar Kabootar (1984), Raat Mein Harmonium (1998), EK Bhasha Hua Karati Hai (2009)

Short story collections He is most famous as a short story writer, with well-known work like Warren Hastings ka Saand, and its stage version by director Arvind Gaur.

- Dariyayi Ghoda (1982), Tirichh (1990), Aur Ant Mein Prarthna (1994),
- Paul Gomra Ka Scooter (1997)., Duttatrey Ke Dukh (2002)
- Areba–Pareba (2006), Mangosil (2006)

Non-fiction

- Eeshwar Ki Aankh (critical writings, essays and interviews, 1999)
- Nai Sadi Ka Panch Tantra (Essays, Comments and Criticism, 2008)
- Apani Unaki Baat (Book of Interviews)

Translations by Prakash

Prakash has translated works by many International poets and writers into Hindi, including Pablo Neruda, Federico García Lorca, H. Luis Borges, Paul Éluard, C.P. Cavafy, Adam Jędrzejewski, and Tadeusz Różewicz. Some notable examples:

- Kala Anubhav : An English book (Art Experience) on Indian Aesthetics by Prof. Hariyanna (1982).
- Amritsar : Indira Gandhi Ki Aakhiri Ladai 1985 (translated from Amritsar: Mrs. Gandhi's Last Battle).
- Romain Rolland's Inde : Two volumes (from French)
- Lal Ghas Par Neele Ghode: A Russian play by Mikhail Shatrov, 1988. (Converted into a Teleplay)
- Ek Purush Dedh Purush : Translated Prasanna's Kannada language play for the NSD repertory production, directed by Ram Gopal Bajaj.

His translation of Milorad Pavić's novel Landscape painted with tea is forthcoming.

Translations of Prakash's work

He is read in all Indian languages, and his translated fiction regularly features in English and German collections, magazines, and complete texts:

1. Rage, Revelry and Romance : Translated by Robert Hueckstedt, 2003
2. Der Goldene Gürtel : Translated by Lothar Lutze, 2007
3. Short shorts, long shots : Translated by Robert Hueckstedt and Amit Tripuraneni
4. The Girl With the Golden Parasol : Translated by Jason Grunebaum, published by Penguin India, 2008. (Grunebaum received a 2005 PEN grant for the translation.). It is available in other languages, including three separate Urdu translations, and German.
5. Doktor Wakankar. Aus dem Leben eines aufrechten Hindus : Prize-winning translation of Aur Ant Mein Prarthana Translated into German (by Andre Penz).
6. The Walls of Delhi : Translated to English by Jason Grunebaum, 2012. A collection of three stories.
7. Mohandas: Translated to Maithili by Vinit Utpal, 2013, published from Sahitya Academy, New Delhi, India

== Films and media ==
'Sahitya Akademi film's on writers

Prakash has produced several films about important Hindi writers such as Ram Vilas Sharma.

In an interview, Varun Grover, the lyricist of the 2015 movie Masaan, recounted that they had wanted to use one of Uday Prakash's compositions titled "Kuch Ban Jate Hain" (from Abootar Abootar). The song was set to music, but at the end was not include in the film. Ultimately another song "Tu Kisi Rail Si" was used in its place (based on a poem by Dushyant Kumar).

== Awards ==
- 1980 Bharat Bhushan Agrawal Puraskar
- 1990 Shrikant Verma Memorial Award, for the short stories collections Tirich
- 1996 Muktibodh Samman, a National Award by Madhya Pradesh Sahitya Parishad for Aur Ant Mein Prathna.
- 1999 Sahityakaar Samman, by the Hindi Akademi
- 2003 Pahal Samman. A prestigious award for contemporary literary contribution.
- 2009 SAARC Literary Award
- 2013 DSC Prize for South Asian Literature, shortlist, The Walls of Delhi (Translated by Jason Grunebaum)
- 2013 Jan Michalski Prize for Literature, finalist, The Walls of Delhi

== See also ==
- List of Indian poets
- List of Indian writers
