= Our Lady of Alice Bhatti =

Novel by Mohammed Hanif

- First edition
- Author: Mohammad Hanif
- Language: English
- Genre: Cultural Fiction
- Publisher: Jonathan Cape
- ISBN: 0-224-08205-1

Our Lady of Alice Bhatti (2011) is a novel by Pakistani author and journalist, Mohammed Hanif.

== Plot ==
The story revolves around the everyday life of a Christian nurse working in a government hospital in the Pakistani city of Karachi.

The author explained that it was a love story, but some critics suggested that the novel is also a statement on the plight of religious minorities living in Pakistan.

== Reception ==
It was shortlisted for the Wellcome Trust Book Prize (2012), and the DSC Prize for South Asian Literature (2013).
