= Maps for Lost Lovers =

2004 novel by Nadeem Aslam

- Cover of first edition (2004)
- Author: Nadeem Aslam
- Language: English
- Publisher: Faber and Faber
- Publication date: 2004
- Publication place: United Kingdom
- Pages: 369
- ISBN: 0571221807
- Dewey Decimal: 823.914

Maps for Lost Lovers is a novel by the British Pakistani writer Nadeem Aslam. It was first published by Faber and Faber in 2004.

Ostensibly about the murder of a pair of lovers, the book is in fact a minute dissection of working-class Pakistani immigrant communities that have settled in the north of England over the last 40 years. Aslam spent 11 years writing this book; according to an interview, the first chapter alone took him 6 years to complete. The novel received widespread acclaim on publication, with critics repeatedly referring to the quality of its prose, its remarkable characters, and its exposé of the tortured immigrant experience.
