= Mirza Waheed =

Kashmiri writer based in London

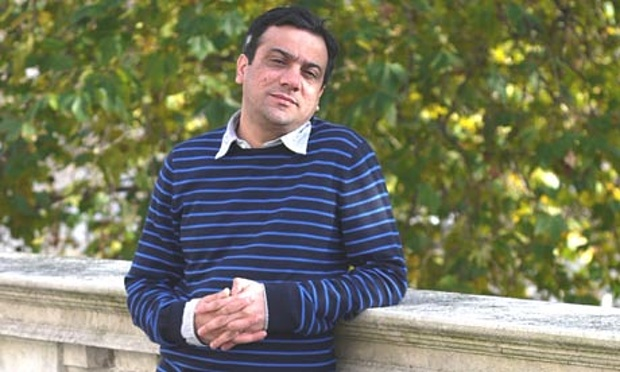
- Mirza in 2016
- Born: Mirza Waheed; Srinagar, Jammu and Kashmir, India
- Citizenship: British
- Education: Kirori Mal College
- Occupations: Journalist and novelist
- Notable credit(s): Author of The Collaborator, The Book of Gold Leaves and Tell Her Everything
- Children: 2

Mirza Waheed is a British novelist and writer. Born and raised in Srinagar, Mirza is known for writing that mainly revolves around the Kashmir conflict and insurgency. Mirza is based in London.

== Writing career ==
Mirza has written for the BBC, The Guardian, Granta, Guernica, Al Jazeera English and The New York Times.

His first novel, The Collaborator, was published in 2011 and was a finalist for the Guardian First Book award. It takes place in his homeland of Kashmir, torn in conflict between India and Pakistan. Novelist Kamila Shamsie reviewed it for The Guardian and called it "gripping in its narrative drama...Mirza gives us a portrait of Kashmir itself. Away from the rhetorical posturing of India and Pakistan, he reveals, with great sensitivity and an anger that arises from compassion, what it is to live in a part of the world that is regarded by the national government as the enemy within, and by the government next door as a strategic puppet."

Mirza's second novel, The Book of Gold Leaves, was published in 2014. A love story between a Sunni and a Shi'ite in troubled 1990s Kashmir, it was reviewed by Alice Albinia in the Financial Times: "A haunting illustration of how, at the end of last century, normal life became impossible for many of those who call Kashmir home."

His third novel, Tell Her Everything, was released in January 2019. It is the story of a father who is preparing to reveal his own unsavory past to the now-grown daughter that he sent away to boarding school as a small child.

== Personal life ==
Mirza and his wife have a son and a daughter and he has said that he limits his book-promotion travels in order to stay home in London and care for them. He worked for the BBC for ten years, but quit in 2011 to devote himself full-time to writing and raising his children.

He plays cricket for the Authors XI team, which is composed of British writers.

== Awards and honours ==
- 2011 "Books of the Year" for The Collaborator in The Telegraph, New Statesman, Business Standard and Telegraph India.
- 2011 Guardian First Book Award finalist for The Collaborator
- 2011 Shakti Bhatt First Book Prize finalist for The Collaborator
- 2012 Desmond Elliott Prize longlist for The Collaborator
- 2016 DSC Prize for South Asian Literature shortlist for The Book of Gold Leaves
- 2019 The Hindu Literary Prize for Tell Her Everything

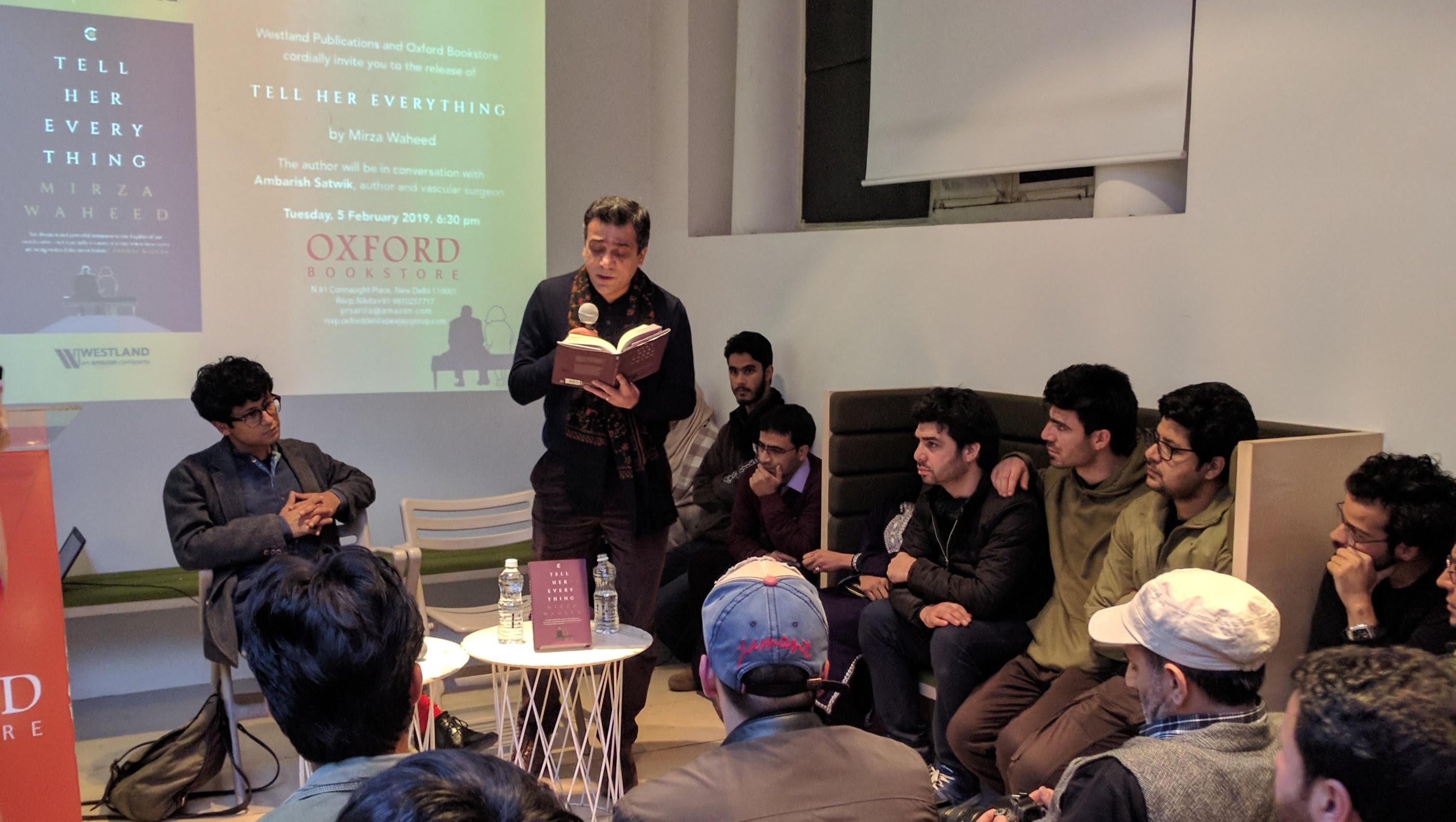
Author Mirza Waheed at a book conversation of "Tell Her Everything", in New Delhi, India

== Books ==
- The Collaborator (2012), ISBN 9780141048581
- The Book of Gold Leaves (2014), ISBN 9780241968109
- Tell Her Everything (2019), ISBN 9789387578890
