= Half the Night is Gone =

First edition

Half the Night is Gone is the third novel by Amitabha Bagchi. It was published by Juggernaut Books and was awarded the DSC Prize for South Asian Literature in 2019, as well as appearing on the JCB Prize for Literature shortlist and The Hindu Literary Prize shortlist.

== Plot ==
The novel is about the Indian novelist Vishwanath, whose heart is broken after the loss of his son.
