= Chronicle of a Corpse Bearer =

2012 novel by Cyrus Mistry

- Author: Cyrus Mistry
- Language: English
- Genre: Fiction; Drama
- Publisher: Aleph Book Company
- Publication date: 2012
- Publication place: India
- Media type: Print (paperback, hardback)
- Pages: 247
- ISBN: 9788192328058

Chronicle of a Corpse Bearer is a 2012 novel written by author and playwright Cyrus Mistry. Set in pre-Independence era of India, the book is about the Parsi community of corpse bearers who carry the dead bodies for burial in Bombay. The idea for the novel came to Mistry in 1991, when he was researching the subject for a film producer, who wanted to make a documentary on it by Channel 4. The film could not be made so Mistry decided to write it as a novel.

Chronicle of a Corpse Bearer won the DSC Prize for South Asian Literature in 2014 and the Sahitya Akademi Award for English in 2015.

== Plot ==
Phiroze Elchidana is a Parsi corpse bearer also known as "khandhias", of the Parsi community whose role is to collect the dead, perform the last rites and rituals before the corpses are left to decay or consumed by the vultures. The son of a priest who is inept at his studies, Phiroze compounds his family’s disappointment by falling in love with Sepideh, the daughter of a khandhia. He later marries her and becomes a corpse bearer himself. Sepideh dies, leaving Phiroze and his daughter in sorrow.

== Reception ==
Writing for Daily News and Analysis, Aditi Sheshadri called it an "interesting and uncommon account of social discrimination" but further said that it is not the "stirring, dramatic, intensely personal tale of love and loss that it could have been." Mahvesh Murad of Dawn wrote: "Chronicle of a Corpse Bearer is not a perfect book, but it is an important one." Jai Arjun Singh said in his review that the novel "reads less like a well-paced, internally consistent novel and more like fragmented socio-history, trying to say too much about too many things." Bakhtiar K. Dadabhoy of Outlook said, "Peppered with grey humour, irony and tragedy, this well-crafted book is a winner."

== See also ==
- A Chronicle of Corpses, a 2000 gothic art-house film
