= 2014 Man Booker Prize =

Book award

The 2014 Man Booker Prize for fiction was awarded at a ceremony on 14 October 2014. Until 2014, only novels written in English and from authors in the Commonwealth, including the UK, the Republic of Ireland and Zimbabwe were eligible for consideration; however, from 2014 rules were changed to extend eligibility to any novel written in English. The longlist of 13 works included four from the United States of America, the first works from authors from outside the previous pool of eligible nations.

== Judging panel ==
The panel of judges was chaired by A. C. Grayling and comprised Jonathan Bate, Sarah Churchwell, Daniel Glaser, Alastair Niven and Erica Wagner.

== Nominees ==
=== Longlist ===
A longlist of thirteen titles was announced on 23 July 2014.

Author	Title	Genre(s)	Country	Publisher
Joshua Ferris	To Rise Again at a Decent Hour	Novel	United States	Viking Press
Richard Flanagan	The Narrow Road to the Deep North	Historical novel	Australia	Chatto & Windus
Karen Joy Fowler	We Are All Completely Beside Ourselves	Novel	United States	Serpent's Tale
Siri Hustvedt	The Blazing World	Novel	United States	Sceptre Press
Howard Jacobson	J	Novel	United Kingdom	Jonathan Cape
Paul Kingsnorth	The Wake	Historical novel	United Kingdom	Unbound
David Mitchell	The Bone Clocks	Novel	United Kingdom	Sceptre Press
Neel Mukherjee	The Lives of Others	Novel	United Kingdom	Chatto and Windus
David Nicholls	Us	Novel	United Kingdom	Hodder and Stoughton
Joseph O'Neill	The Dog	Novel	Ireland	Fourth Estate
Richard Powers	Orfeo	Novel	United States	Atlantic Books
Ali Smith	How to Be Both	Historical novel	United Kingdom	Hamish Hamilton
Niall Williams	History of the Rain	Novel	Ireland	Bloomsbury

=== Shortlist ===
The shortlist of six novels was announced on 9 September 2014. It was composed of:

Author	Title
Joshua Ferris	To Rise Again at a Decent Hour
Richard Flanagan	The Narrow Road to the Deep North
Karen Joy Fowler	We Are All Completely Beside Ourselves
Howard Jacobson	J
Neel Mukherjee	The Lives of Others
Ali Smith	How to Be Both

== Winner ==
On 14 October, chair judge A. C. Grayling announced that Australian author Richard Flanagan had won the 2014 Man Booker Prize for his book The Narrow Road to the Deep North. The judges spent three hours deliberating before announcing the winner. Grayling described the historical novel as a "remarkable love story as well as a story about human suffering and comradeship".

== See also ==
- List of winners and shortlisted authors of the Booker Prize for Fiction
