= Tell Her Everything =

2018 book

- Author: Mirza Waheed
- Language: English
- Publication date: 2018

Tell Her Everything is the third novel by Mirza Waheed which was published in 2018 by Westland Books and republished on 7 February 2023 by Melville House Publishing. It is the story of a father who is preparing to reveal his own unsavory past to the now-grown daughter that he sent away to boarding school as a small child.

== Critical reception ==
Jury of The Hindu Literary Prize described the book as "sensitive and complex", Saudamini Jain of Hindustan Times wrote: "Tell Her Everything is a sedate exploration of moral accountability, of the ethics and emotions of morality." Sanjay Sipahimalani of Scroll.in wrote "The author's third novel is the digressive first-person account of a doctor reliving a difficult past."

The book has been also reviewed by Somak Ghoshal of Live Mint, Vaishna Roy of The Hindu, Suma Nagaraj of Deccan Chronicle, and Karthik Shankar of HuffPost.

The book won 2019 The Hindu Literary Prize.
