= The Walls of Delhi =

2012 novel by Uday Prakash

- Author: Uday Prakash
- Language: English
- Publisher: UWA Publishing
- Publication date: 2012
- Publication place: India
- Media type: Print (Paperback)
- Pages: 236 pp (Paperback edition)
- ISBN: 978-1-74258-392-1 (Paperback edition)

The Walls of Delhi is a novel by Indian writer Uday Prakash. It was translated into English by Jason Grunebaum. Novel tells three stinging and comic tales of living and surviving in today's urban, globalised India. Author portrays the realities about caste and class, and there is a charming and compelling authenticity in his stories. The Walls of Delhi was shortlisted for the DSC Prize for South Asian Literature (2013), and was a 2013 Jan Michalski Prize for Literature finalist.
