= The Book of Gold Leaves =

2014 novel

- Author: Mirza Waheed
- Language: English
- Publisher: Viking
- Publication date: 30 October 2014
- Publication place: London
- Media type: Print (paperback)
- Pages: 338 pp
- ISBN: 9780241968109

The Book of Gold Leaves is a book by Mirza Waheed which was published in 2014 by Penguin Books.

== Plot ==
The Book of Gold Leaves is set in the 1990s where tensions Kashmir were simmering due to rebellion and political strife. The book tells the story of a Sunni-Shia romance between Roohi and Faiz.

== Critical reception ==
Alice Albinia of the Financial Times wrote "Waheed's second, new novel, The Book of Gold Leaves, is, aesthetically, a very different book", Kashoo Tawseef of Countercurrents.org wrote "The art of story telling and flow of writing has very well crafted by the author and makes you feel that you are among the characters of the novel." Iram Shafi Allaie of The Criterion wrote "The plot of the The Book of Gold Leaves is clear and the language is simple." and "The Book of Gold Leaves has been received very warmly by critics." Mahvesh Murad of Dawn wrote "The Collaborator was also a beautiful, emotional and lyrical novel and The Book of Gold Leaves is even more so, almost to the point of being indulgent." Chitra Ramaswamy of The Guardian wrote "The effect of this tense novel is cumulative."

Mary Ann Pickford of The Northern Echo gave 6 out of 10 stars.

The book has been also reviewed by Deepa Dharmadhikari of Live Mint, Gargi Gupta of Daily News and Analysis, and Shah Khalid of Daily Times.
