= Brilliant Creatures (2014 TV series) =

Brilliant Creatures is a two-part Australian biographical documentary TV series on four notable expatriates who travelled to London in the 1960s and who, in separate fields of endeavour, won international fame there and in New York over several decades. The stories of Germaine Greer, Clive James, Barry Humphries and Bob Hughes were written and presented by Howard Jacobson. The series was produced in association with the Australian Broadcasting Corporation which first aired the series in September 2014.

== See also ==
- Australian diaspora
- Australians in the United Kingdom
- Category:Australian expatriates in the United Kingdom
