= Same Bed Different Dreams (novel) =

2023 novel by Ed Park

- Author: Ed Park
- Genre: Historical fiction, speculative fiction, alternate history
- Publisher: Random House
- Publication date: November 7, 2023
- Pages: 544
- Awards: Los Angeles Times Book Prize for Fiction
- ISBN: 978-0812998979
- Preceded by: Personal Days

Same Bed Different Dreams is a novel by American novelist Ed Park, published by Random House in 2023. The novel traces an alternate history of the Korean Provisional Government during the Japanese occupation of Korea and the Korean War after their historical revisionist manuscript is discovered by a Korean American writer in the early twenty-first century. The book was a finalist for the 2024 Pulitzer Prize for Fiction and won the 2023 Los Angeles Times Book Prize for Fiction.

== Synopsis ==
In 2015, Korean American writer Soon Sheen acquires an advance copy of a novel, titled Same Bed, Different Dreams, by a South Korean poet named Echo. The novel provides a secret history of the Korean Provisional Government (KPG), a government-in-exile established in 1919, and their activities during Korea under Japanese rule and onward. As Sheen reads the novel further, he discovers the KPG's involvement with a litany of historical events like the Korean War and the founding of the Unification Church, as well as figures such as Syngman Rhee, Ronald Reagan, and Marilyn Monroe. All the while, Sheen raises his daughter, Story, works at a tech company called GLOAT, and recalls his run-ins with the fictitious science fiction novelist Parker Jotter.

== Critical reception ==
In a starred review, Kirkus Reviews called "Park's beguiling, deliberately knotty second novel" a "brash, rangy, sui generis feat of speculative fiction." Also in a starred review, Publishers Weekly called the novel an "ingenious postmodern epic of colonial and postcolonial Korea framed in a satire of America's publishing and tech industries."

Critics appreciated Park's ambitious approach to the novel form, as well as history. The New York Times called the novel "the rare sophomore novel that has the wild, freewheeling ambition of a debut." Bomb similarly dubbed it "wildly ambitious, brilliantly conceived, funny, sad, moving". The Los Angeles Times likened its successfully executed ambition to works by Anthony Doerr, Namwali Serpell, David Mitchell, and Jennifer Egan. The Washington Post wrote that "Switching fluidly between genres — multigenerational family saga; spy thriller; comedy of manners — the novel unspools like a dazzling demo reel."

The Star Tribune found the book's concept more interesting than its execution, "appreciating Park's whimsy, erudition and daring more than this manifestation of his many talents."

Publishers Weekly included the book on their list of Best Books of 2023. The New York Times included it on an Editors' Choice list and their 100 Notable Books of 2023 list. The Washington Post included it on an anticipated fall reading list, as well as their later list of 50 Notable Works of Fiction for 2023. Polygon placed it on their list of Best Sci-Fi and Fantasy Books of 2023.

== Influences ==
The book's title is a direct reference to a saying in South Korea referring to how two married people can simultaneously share a life together but have contrasting goals or senses of purpose.

Park drew inspiration for the postmodern aspects of his novel from American predecessors like Thomas Pynchon and Don DeLillo, combining them with his own experiences as a Korean American editor and publisher, as well as a student of modern Korean history in college. He also cited the English translation of Korean novelist Han Kang's The Vegetarian as a turning point in his understanding of how American bookselling markets thought about Korean and Korean American narratives.
