= Udayan Mukherjee =

Indian television journalist and economist

- Born: India
- Education: Presidency College, Kolkata (BSc); Jawaharlal Nehru University (MA)
- Occupations: Television journalist and economist; writer
- Relatives: Neel Mukherjee (brother)
- Awards: Ramnath Goenka Award (2012)

Udayan Mukherjee is an Indian television journalist and economist, who was formerly the managing editor with CNBC India. He is 52 years old and moved to Kumaon in 2013. He lives in Seetla, Uttarakhand.

Udayan is an economist by training, having obtained his BSc in economics from Presidency College, Kolkata, and an MA in economics from Jawaharlal Nehru University, New Delhi. He began his career with UTV. At CNBC India, he was the managing editor and anchored live market shows until he stepped down in 2013, citing professional fatigue. He is also a writer of fiction.

In 2018, he wrote a novel titled Dark Circles. Mental health was a key issue he wanted to address in the book. He also shared his own journey from the newsroom to the writing desk, and why he planned never to return to television studios again. Subsequently, he turned entrepreneur and set up two resorts in Munsiyari (Uttarakhand) and Ladakh. However, in June 2021, Mukherjee made a comeback with the India Today group, joining their business channel Business Today.

== Awards ==
- 2012, Ramnath Goenka Award, Journalist of the Year in the broadcasting category.

== Books ==
Mukherjee has authored three books of fiction during his time away from the studios. Death in the Himalayas is a book in the mystery fiction genre. Dark Circles is a novel about mental health issues. Essential Items: Stories from a Land in Lockdown is a collection of short stories that he wrote during the COVID 19 pandemic.
