= The Finkler Question =

2010 novel by Howard Jacobson

- First edition
- Author: Howard Jacobson
- Cover artist: David Mann
- Language: English
- Genre: Comic novel
- Publisher: Bloomsbury
- Publication date: 2010
- Publication place: United Kingdom
- Media type: Print (hardcover and paperback)
- Pages: 320
- ISBN: 9781408808870
- OCLC: 664673537
- Dewey Decimal: 823.914
- LC Class: PR6060.A32 F56 2010b

The Finkler Question is a 2010 novel written by British author Howard Jacobson. The novel won the Booker Prize.

== Plot synopsis ==
Julian Treslove, a professionally unspectacular former BBC radio producer, and Sam Finkler, a popular Jewish philosopher, writer and television personality, are old school friends. Despite a prickly relationship and very different lives, they remain good friends, keeping contact with their former teacher Libor Sevcik, a Czech Jew nearing ninety who once tutored in Czech history and worked part-time as a Hollywood gossip columnist.

Now, both Libor and Finkler are recently widowed, and Treslove's chequered and unsuccessful record with women qualify him as an honorary third widower. They dine together at Libor's grand apartment in central London: it is a sweetly painful evening of reminiscences. At 11:30 pm that night, Treslove is attacked while walking home. It seems he is mugged by a woman who hisses the phrase "You Ju" at him. After much cogitation, Treslove believes what the assailant meant was "You, Jew", sparking a long-running obsession with all things and people Jewish – which he refers to as "Finkler". Treslove gets into a relationship with Hephzibah, the great-grandniece of Libor, and is haunted by his adulterous affair with Tyler, Finkler's deceased wife. In the meantime, Finkler joins an "ASHamed" organization which favours the Palestinians over the Israelis over their land disputes. The novel coalesces into an ending that brings together the disparate narrative strands amongst the three central male characters.

== Critical response ==
Chairman of the judges and former Poet Laureate Andrew Motion said, "The Finkler Question should not be seen as something that was 'relentlessly middle-brow, or easy-peasy' because it was comic. It is much cleverer and more complicated and about much more difficult things than it immediately lets you know. Several people have used the word wise, and that's a good word."

== Awards and honours ==
The novel won the Booker Prize in 2010 and was the first comic novel to win the prize since Kingsley Amis's The Old Devils in 1986. Jacobson was the oldest winner since William Golding who won the prize in 1980, aged 69, for Rites of Passage. In his acceptance speech, Jacobson claimed he was going to spend his £50,000 prize money on a handbag for his wife, asking, "Have you seen the price of handbags?"

It was shortlisted for the JQ Wingate Prize (2011).
