= To Rise Again at a Decent Hour =

Novel by Joshua Ferris

First edition (publ. Little, Brown)

To Rise Again at a Decent Hour is a novel by the American writer Joshua Ferris. The novel was shortlisted for the 2014 Man Booker Prize and won the 2014 Dylan Thomas Prize. It centers on a New York City dentist who's obsessed with the Boston Red Sox and, variously, the religions of different girlfriends. The discovery that he's the victim of a strange sort of identity theft leads him into a darkly comic crisis of identity and meaning.
