= 99 Nights in Logar =

2019 novel by Jamil Jan Kochai

99 Nights in Logar, published January 8, 2019, is the debut novel of Jamil Jan Kochai. The novel is set in Logar, Afghanistan, and is narrated by an Afghan-American boy named Marwand, who recounts the summer he spent in 2005 visiting his parents' hometown. The novel begins "On the Thirty Second Morning" of Marwand's stay.

99 Nights in Logar received wide critical acclaim and Kochai was selected as finalist for the PEN/Hemingway Award for Debut Novel.

== Background ==
While Jamil Jan Kochai was born in an Afghan refugee camp in Peshawar, his family is from Logar, Afghanistan, where the novel is set. The novel is work of fiction, yet Jan Kochai has said in interviews that the novel is loosely inspired by a recurring memory he has from when he was 12, when he and his cousins were chasing the family guard dog – Budabesh – that had escaped.

The book is written in English, though the second to last chapter of the book, immediately before "On the Ninety-Ninth Day", is written entirely in Pashto. The section is said to be about a significant family secret, and Jan Kochai stated, "I wanted to upset this notion that, in order for this story to have value, it needed to be made consumable for an English readership".

The novel includes many embedded narratives, and Jamil Jan Kochai said that he decided to add the tales after reading One Thousand and One Nights, which is a collection of middle eastern folktales compiled during the Islamic Golden Age. Furthermore, Jan Kochai notes that the stories allowed him "to demonstrate the complexity, nuance and depth of life in Afghanistan" while using a traditional oral story-telling style found in Afghanistan.

The novel is widely seen as pertaining to the magical realism genre, and 99 Nights in Logar is defined by Jan Kochai's blend of realism and the fantastic which incorporates Afghan and Islamic tales to root the story in history.

== Plot ==
99 Nights is a coming-of-age story set in Logar, a village in Afghanistan. The book's protagonist is Marwand, a twelve-year-old Afghani-American boy who is visiting Logar over the summer of 2005 with his family. His parents are both from the village, and this is the first time they have been back in over 5 years – since the American invasion of Afghanistan.

The novel follows Marwand, his two younger uncles (Gul and Duwood) and his cousin Zia, as they chase after Budabush, the large dog that guards the family compound. Budabush becomes loose after a fateful encounter with Marwand, who loses his finger after attempting to make amends with the dog, which he threw stones at during his last visit.

Throughout the rest of the story, we follow them as they journey across contemporary Afghanistan. Marwand explores his connection with Afghanistan, his ancestral home, against the backdrop of the US invasion and occupation. They encounter a myriad of things on their journey, from a cobra to a suspected member of the Taliban and several US military helicopters. They also keep themselves entertained by telling each other stories such as the "Tale of the Old Dog" or "The Tale of the Evidence of God's Existence". While some of the tales are traditional folk tales, many center around the US invasion of Afghanistan and the behaviour of soldiers.

The family is also struck by a mysterious and contagious illness which engulfs the household and is only beaten after quarantine and a questionable cure.

== Critical reception ==
Nights in Logar received critical acclaim upon its release in 2020. Beyond leading to Jan Kochai being shortlisted for the PEN/Hemingway award for debut novel, the work also was shortlisted for the DSC Prize for South Asian literature and received favourable reviews from The Guardian, NPR, and The New York Times.
