= Nayomi Munaweera =

Sri Lankan American writer (born 1973)

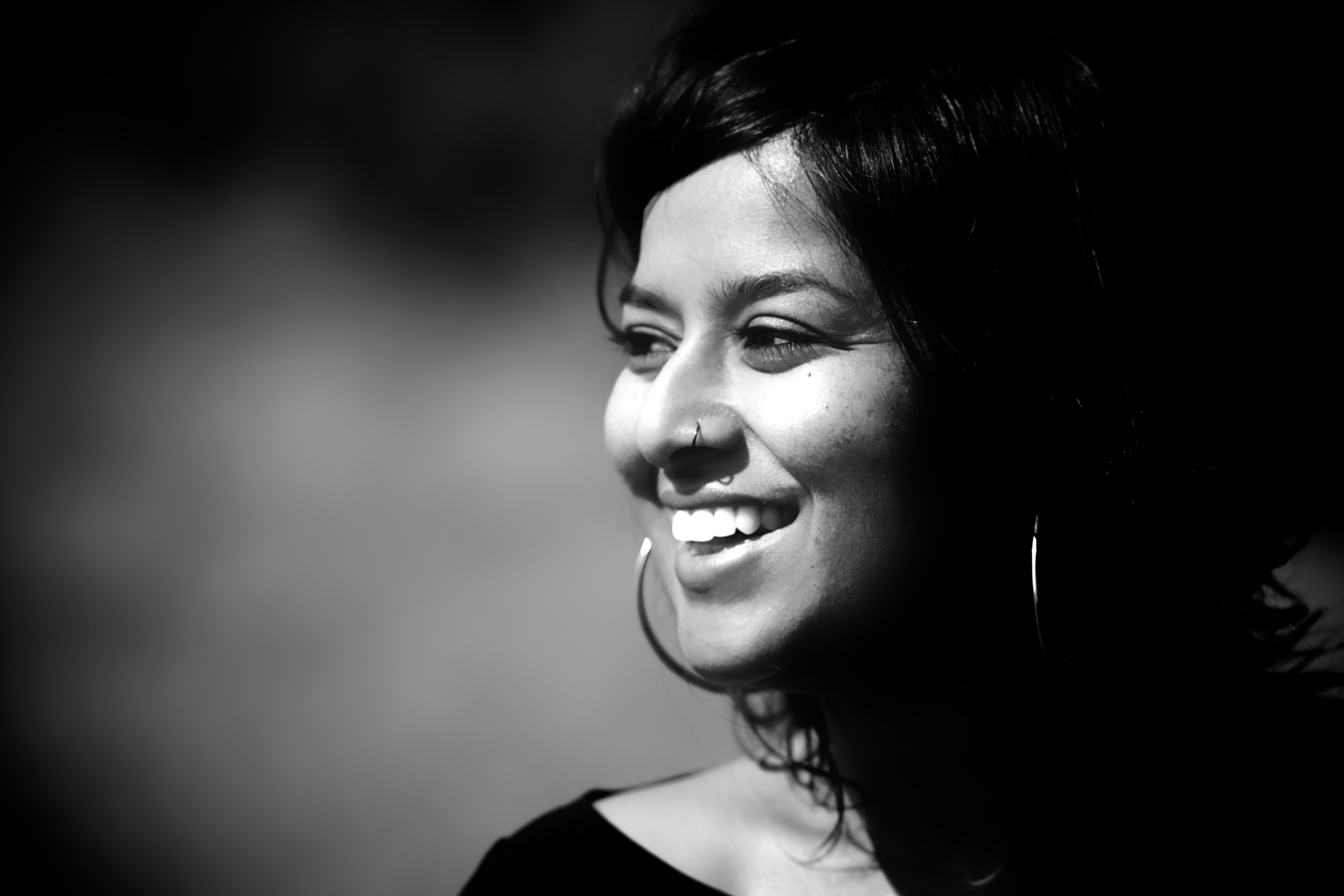
- Born: 1973 (age 52–53); Sri Lanka
- Occupation: Novelist
- Writing career
- Language: English
- Genre: Fiction
- Website: nayomimunaweera.com

Nayomi Munaweera is a Sri Lankan American writer and author of Island of a Thousand Mirrors, which won Commonwealth Book Prize for the Asian Region in 2013, and What Lies Between Us (2016), which won the Sri Lankan National Book Award for best English novel and the Godage Award.

== Biography ==
Nayomi Munaweera was born in Sri Lanka in 1973. Her family moved to Nigeria when she was three. In 1984, there was a military coup in Nigeria and her family moved again, this time to Los Angeles. She holds bachelor's degree in Literature from the University of California, Irvine and a master's degree in South Asian Literature from the University of California, Riverside. Munaweera now lives in Oakland and teaches at Mills College and Ashland University.

Island of a Thousand Mirrors was her debut novel and was published in South Asia in 2012. It went on to be nominated for many of the sub-continent's major literary prizes including Man Asian Literary Prize and won the Commonwealth Regional Prize for Asia in 2013. It was long listed for the International DUBLIN Literary Award and short listed for the DSC Prize for South Asian Literature. The novel was released in America by St. Martin's Press in 2014. It tells the story of the Sri Lankan civil war (1983-2009) from the perspective of two girls -- one Tamil and one Sinhalese -- who witness the horror.

== Works ==
- Island of a Thousand Mirrors, Colombo: Perera Hussein Pub. House, ISBN 9789558897249; New York: St. Martin's Griffin Press, 2016. ISBN 9781250051875
- What Lies Between Us New York: St. Martin's Griffin, 2016. ISBN 9781250118172
