= Ed Park =

American journalist and novelist

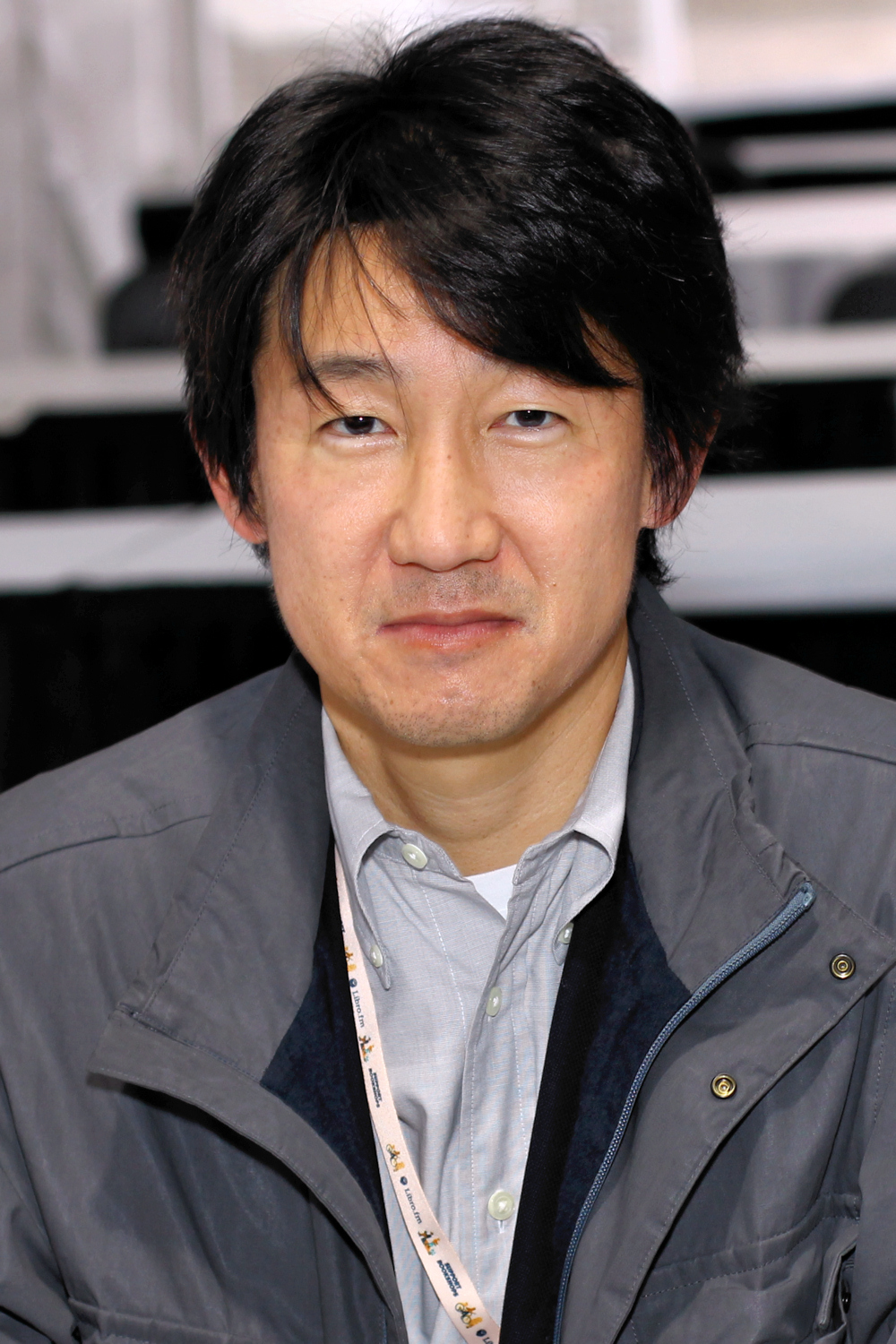
- Park at the 2023 Texas Book Festival
- Born: 1970 (age 55–56); Buffalo, New York, U.S.
- Education: Yale University (BA); Columbia University (MFA)
- Notable work: Personal Days; Same Bed Different Dreams
- Awards: LA Times Book Prize (2023)
- Website: Official website

Ed Park (born 1970 in Buffalo, New York) is an American writer and editor. He was the executive editor of Penguin Press. He is the author of the novel Same Bed Different Dreams, which was a finalist for 2024 Pulitzer Prize for Fiction.

== Early life and education ==
Park was born and raised in Buffalo, New York. He received his B.A. in English from Yale University and his M.F.A. in Writing from Columbia University.

== Career ==
Park was a founding editor of the magazine The Believer in 2003, and has been an editor at the Poetry Foundation, as well as the editor of the Village Voice's Literary Supplement. Beginning in August 2006, soon after he lost his job at the Village Voice, he circulated a PDF-only newsletter called "The New-York Ghost". From 2007 to 2011, he wrote the science-fiction column "Astral Weeks" for the Los Angeles Times. His stories, articles, and humor have appeared in The New Yorker. From 2018 to 2021, he wrote the graphic novel column for the New York Times Book Review.

In 2011, he was hired by Amazon Publishing as a senior editor, where he was in charge of the company's literary side. After hiring him, Amazon later gave him his own imprint, Little A. He earned Amazon a major literary prize while working there. He has written introductions to several books, including Anthony Powell's Afternoon Men, and co-edited three anthologies: Read Hard and Read Harder (both with Heidi Julavits), and Buffalo Noir (with Brigid Hughes). In 2014, it was reported that he had been hired by Penguin Press as executive editor.

He has taught in the graduate writing program at Columbia University. He currently teaches at Princeton University.

== Books ==
Park's debut novel, Personal Days, was published by Random House in May 2008. It was a finalist for the 2009 PEN/Hemingway Award, the Center for Fiction First Novel Prize (then known as the John Sargent Sr. First Novel Prize), and the Asian American Literary Award. It was also named one of the ten best fiction books of the year by Time.

Park's second novel, Same Bed Different Dreams, was published by Random House in November 2023. Publishers Weekly named it a "Top 10 Book of the Year." The New York Times said, "It's a challenging read and yet wonderfully suspenseful, like watching a circus performer juggle a dozen torches…A sprawling, stunning novel." The book won the 2023 Los Angeles Times Book Prize for Fiction. It won the 2024-2025 Asian American Literary Award. On May 6, 2024, Same Bed Different Dreams was announced as a finalist for 2024 Pulitzer Prize for Fiction.

Park's debut story collection, An Oral History of Atlantis, was published by Random House in July 2025. The stories included were written over a 25 year period. Jake Casella Brookins at The Chicago Review of Books described the collection as "Always witty, sometimes surreal, frequently diving beneath mundane surfaces to mysterious and mesmerizing depths, An Oral History of Atlantis, the first collection of Ed Park’s short stories, showcases a master of the form."

His memoir, Three Tenses: A Transmission from the Nineties, was published by Random House on August 11, 2026. Originally written in 1998, and thought to be lost, the manuscript was rediscovered by Park in 2020.

== Personal life ==
As of 2014, he lives on Manhattan's Upper West Side with his wife and two sons.

== Awards ==
Year	Work	Award	Category	Result	Ref
2008	Personal Days	Center for Fiction First Novel Prize	—	Finalist	
2009	Personal Days	PEN/Hemingway Award	—	Finalist	
2023	Same Bed Different Dreams	Los Angeles Times Book Prize	Fiction	Won	
2024	Same Bed Different Dreams	Pulitzer Prize	Fiction	Finalist	
2025	Same Bed Different Dreams	Asian American Literary Award	Adult Fiction	Won	

== Bibliography ==
=== Novels ===
- —— (2008). Personal Days. Random House. ISBN 9780812978575.
- —— (2023). Same Bed Different Dreams. Random House. ISBN 9780812988321.

=== Short story collections ===
- —— (2025). An Oral History of Atlantis. Random House. ISBN 9780812988345.
- —— (2026). The Repairer of Reputations. (With Robert W. Chambers). Soho Press. ISBN 9781641298728.

=== Memoir ===
- —— (2026). Three Tenses: A Transmission from the Nineties. Random House. ISBN 9798217154944.
