= Then We Came to the End =

2007 novel by Joshua Ferris

- First US edition with image of Post-it notes
- Author: Joshua Ferris
- Language: English
- Genre: Novel
- Publisher: Little, Brown and Company
- Publication date: March 1, 2007
- Publication place: United States
- Media type: Print (Hardback)
- Pages: 400 pp (HB 1st edition)
- ISBN: 978-0-316-01638-4
- OCLC: 62679893
- Dewey Decimal: 813/.6 22
- LC Class: PS3606.E774 T47 2007

Then We Came to the End is the first novel by Joshua Ferris. It was released by Little, Brown and Company on March 1, 2007. A satire of the American workplace, it is similar in tone to Don DeLillo's Americana, even borrowing DeLillo's first line for its title.

It takes place in a Chicago advertising agency that is experiencing a downturn at the end of the 1990s Internet boom. Ferris employs a first-person-plural narrative.

== Critical reaction ==
The book was greeted with positive reviews from GQ, The New York Times,The New Yorker, Esquire, and Slate. The book was named one of the Best Books of 2007 by The New York Times.

Time magazine's Lev Grossman named it one of the Top 10 Fiction Books of 2007, ranking it at No. 2.

The book won the PEN/Hemingway Award for best first novel and the 2007 Barnes & Noble Discover Great New Writers Award.

== See also ==
- Personal Days by Ed Park
