= Joshua Ferris =

American author (born 1974)

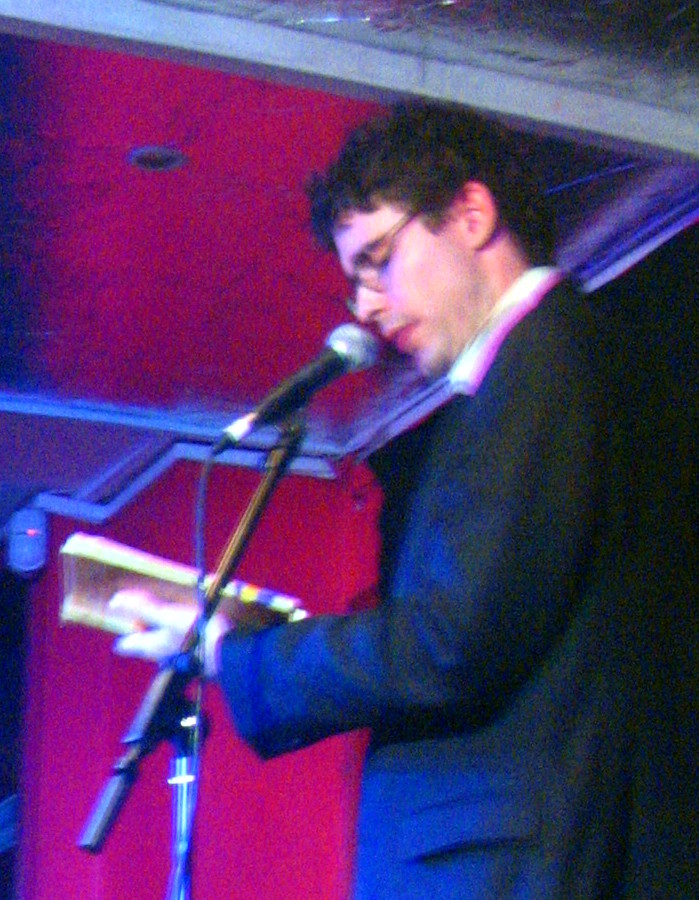
- Ferris in 2008
- Born: November 8, 1974 (age 52); Danville, Illinois, U.S.
- Education: University of Iowa (BA); University of California, Irvine (MFA)
- Occupation: Novelist

Joshua Ferris (born November 8, 1974) is an American author best known for his debut novel Then We Came to the End (2007). The novel is a comedy about the American workplace, is narrated in the first-person plural, and is set in a fictitious Chicago ad agency facing challenges at the end of the 1990s Internet boom.

== Biography ==
Ferris graduated from the University of Iowa with a BA in English and philosophy in 1996. He moved to Chicago and worked in advertising for several years before obtaining an MFA in writing from UC Irvine. His first published story, "Mrs. Blue," appeared in the Iowa Review in 1999. Then We Came to the End received positive reviews from The New York Times Book Review, The New Yorker, Esquire, and Slate, has been published in 25 languages, was a finalist for the National Book Award, and received the 2007 PEN/Hemingway Award.

In August 2008, The New Yorker published Ferris's short story "The Dinner Party", which earned him a nomination for the Shirley Jackson Awards. Another story, "A Night Out", was published in Tin House's tenth-anniversary issue. Other short fiction has appeared in Best New American Voices 2007 and New Stories from the South 2007. His nonfiction has appeared in the anthologies State by State and Heavy Rotation. The New Yorker included him in its 2010 "20 Under 40" list.

Ferris's second novel, The Unnamed, was published in January 2010. It garnered many prominent, although mixed, reviews. Kirkus Reviews called it "audacious, risky and powerfully bleak, with the author's unflinching artistry its saving grace." The New York Times review, by novelist Jay McInerney, called it "a road novel with severe tunnel vision.”

Ferris's third novel, To Rise Again at a Decent Hour, was published in May 2014. The novel was shortlisted for the 2014 Man Booker Prize in the first year that American works of fiction were eligible, and won the 2014 Dylan Thomas Prize and the National Jewish Book Award.

== Bibliography ==
=== Novels ===
- Then We Came to the End (2007)
- The Unnamed (2010)
- To Rise Again at a Decent Hour (2014)
- A Calling for Charlie Barnes (2021)

=== Short fiction ===
- The Dinner Party: Stories (2017)

Title	Year	First published	Reprinted/collected
The fragments	2013	Ferris, Joshua (April 29, 2013). "The fragments". The New Yorker. Vol. 89, no. 11. pp. 64–69.	
The breeze	2013	Ferris, Joshua (September 30, 2013). "The breeze". The New Yorker. Vol. 89, no. 30. pp. 64–71.	

- "Mrs. Blue", Iowa Review 29.2 (Fall 1999)
- "Ghost Town Choir", Prairie Schooner 80.3 (Fall 2006)
- "It Would Be Life--", Phoebe (2007)
- "Uncertainty", Tin House 34 (Winter 2007)
- "More Afraid of You", Granta 101 (Spring 2008)
- "The Dinner Party", The New Yorker, 11 Aug 2008
- "The Valetudinarian", The New Yorker, 3 Aug 2009
- "A Night Out", Tin House 40 (10th Anniversary Issue)
- "The Unnamed", Granta 109 (Winter 2009) [novel excerpt]
- "The Pilot", The New Yorker, June 14 & 21, 2010
- "Good Legs", The New Yorker, June 2, 2014
- "The Abandonment", The New Yorker, August 1, 2016

=== Essays and reporting ===
- "Nine to Five", "The Guardian" (2007)
- "The World According to Wallace", "The Guardian" (2008)
