= Mohammed Hanif =

British Pakistani writer and journalist (born 1965)

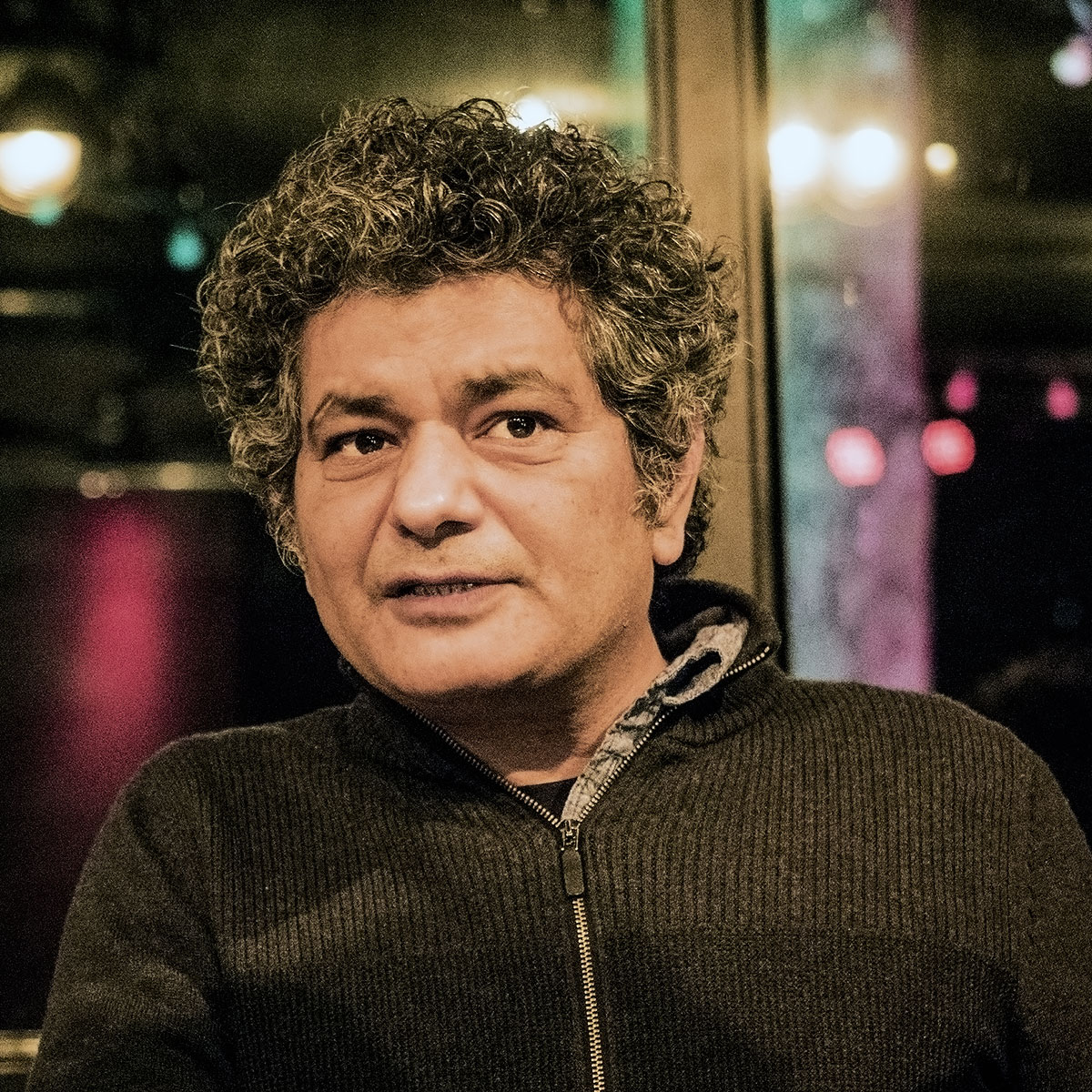
- Hanif Mohammed Koeln
- Born: November 1964 (age 61); Okara, Punjab, Pakistan
- Education: University of East Anglia, Pakistan Air Force Academy
- Occupations: Writer, journalist
- Spouse: Nimra Bucha
- Writing career
- Period: 2008–present
- Notable work: A Case of Exploding Mangoes
- Notable awards: Wellcome Book Prize, Sitara-i-Imtiaz, Commonwealth Prize for Best Book

Mohammed Hanif (born November 1964) is a British-Pakistani writer and journalist. His work has been published by The New York Times, The Daily Telegraph, The New Yorker and The Washington Post. Hanif worked as a correspondent for the BBC News based in Karachi and was the writer of a feature film about the city, The Long Night. Hanif has written four novels, A Case of Exploding Mangoes.,Our Lady of Alice Bhatti, Red Birds, and Rebel English Academy as well as a play, The Dictator's Wife, which was staged at the Hampstead Theatre.

== Life ==
He was born in Okara, Punjab. He graduated from Pakistan Air Force Academy as a pilot officer, but subsequently left to pursue a career in journalism. He initially worked for Newsline and wrote for The Washington Post and India Today. He is a graduate of the University of East Anglia. In 1996, he moved to London to work for the BBC. Later, he became the head of the BBC's Urdu service in London. He moved back to Pakistan in 2008.

== Works ==
His first novel A Case of Exploding Mangoes (2008) was shortlisted for the 2008 Guardian First Book Award and longlisted for the 2008 Man Booker Prize.It won the 2009 Commonwealth Book Prize in the Best First Book category and the 2008 Shakti Bhatt First Book Prize. It also won Corine Literature Prize in 2009.

Hanif has also written for the stage and screen, including a feature film, The Long Night (2002), a BBC radio play, What Now, Now That We Are Dead?, and the stage play The Dictator's Wife (2008). His second novel, Our Lady of Alice Bhatti, was published in 2011. It was shortlisted for the Wellcome Trust Book Prize (2012), and the DSC Prize for South Asian Literature (2013).In 2018, Hanif was honored with Sitara-e-Imtiaz.

He is currently collaborating with composer Mohammed Fairouz on an opera titled Bhutto.

In 2018, he wrote a novel called Red Birds.

Hanif's style has often been compared with that of the author Salman Rushdie, although Hanif himself disagrees with this assessment. Once, to a question if he had grown up wanting to be a writer like Salman Rushdie, he said that while "[e]verybody of a certain age wanted to write like Rushdie and so did I", he would not want being "hunted around the world."

== Awards and honors ==
Awards for Mohammed Hanif's writing
| Year | Work | Award | Result | Ref. |
|---|---|---|---|---|
| 2008 | A Case of Exploding Mangoes | Guardian First Book Award | Shortlist | |
| 2008 | A Case of Exploding Mangoes | Man Booker Prize | Longlist | |
| 2008 | A Case of Exploding Mangoes | Shakti Bhatt Prize First Book Prize | Winner | |
| 2009 | A Case of Exploding Mangoes | Commonwealth Book Prize (Best First Book) | Winner | |
| 2009 | A Case of Exploding Mangoes | Corine Literature Prize | Winner | |
| 2012 | Our Lady of Alice Bhatti | Wellcome Trust Book Prize | Shortlist | |
| 2013 | Our Lady of Alice Bhatti | DSC Prize for South Asian Literature | Winner | |

=== Award Return ===
In opposition to Pakistan's ongoing persecution of the Baloch people and police crackdown during a protest march in Islamabad on 20 December 2023, Mohammed Hanif has returned his "Sitara-e-Imtiaz" award.

== Bibliography ==
=== Films ===
- The Long Night (Script) (2002)

=== Books ===
- A Case of Exploding Mangoes (Novel)(2008)
- Our Lady of Alice Bhatti (Novel)(2011)
- The Baloch who is not missing and others who are (2013)
- Red Birds (Novel)(2018)
- Rebel English Academy (Novel)(2026)

=== Plays ===
- What Now, Now That We Are Dead? (radio play)
- The Dictator's Wife (2008)

== Personal life ==
Hanif is married to the actress Nimra Bucha.
