= The Collaborator (Waheed novel) =

2011 novel by Mirza Waheed

- First edition cover
- Author: Mirza Waheed
- Language: English
- Genre: Fiction
- Published: 2011
- Publisher: Penguin Books
- Media type: Print
- Pages: 320

The Collaborator is the 2011 debut novel by Mirza Waheed. The novel is set on the Indian side of the Line of Control that separates Indian Kashmir from Pakistani Kashmir. The first-person narrator is a young man who ends up working for the Indian Army, counting the number of dead militants, killed in encounters, with the Indian army.

== Reception ==
The book The Collaborator was featured in 2011 "Books of the Year" in The Telegraph, New Statesman, Business Standard and Telegraph India. It was also 2011 Guardian First Book Award finalist and shortlisted for the 2011 Shakti Bhatt First Book Prize.
