= Amitabha Bagchi =

Indian writer (born 1974)

- Born: 1974 (age 51–52); Delhi, India
- Occupation: Author
- Writing career
- Genres: Fiction and nonfiction
- Notable works: Half the Night is Gone; This Place
- Notable awards: DSC Prize for South Asian Literature (2019)

Amitabha Bagchi is an Indian author, who was awarded DSC Prize for South Asian Literature in 2019 and shortlisted for JCB Prize for Literature and The Hindu Literary Prize for his novel Half the Night is Gone. He is the author of five novels.

== Personal life ==
He was born in 1974 in Delhi and is currently serving as a Professor of Computer science at IIT Delhi. He was awarded the DSC Prize for South Asian Literature at the Nepal Literature Festival.

== Books ==
Amitabha Bagchi has published five novels

- Above Average (2007)
- The Householder (2012)
- This Place (2013)
- Half the Night is Gone (2018)
- Unknown City (2025)

In addition, he has also translated a volume of poems by the Urdu poet Munir Niazi

- Lost Paradise: Selected Ghazals of Muneer Niazi (2022)
