= Patrick Flanery =

American author and academic

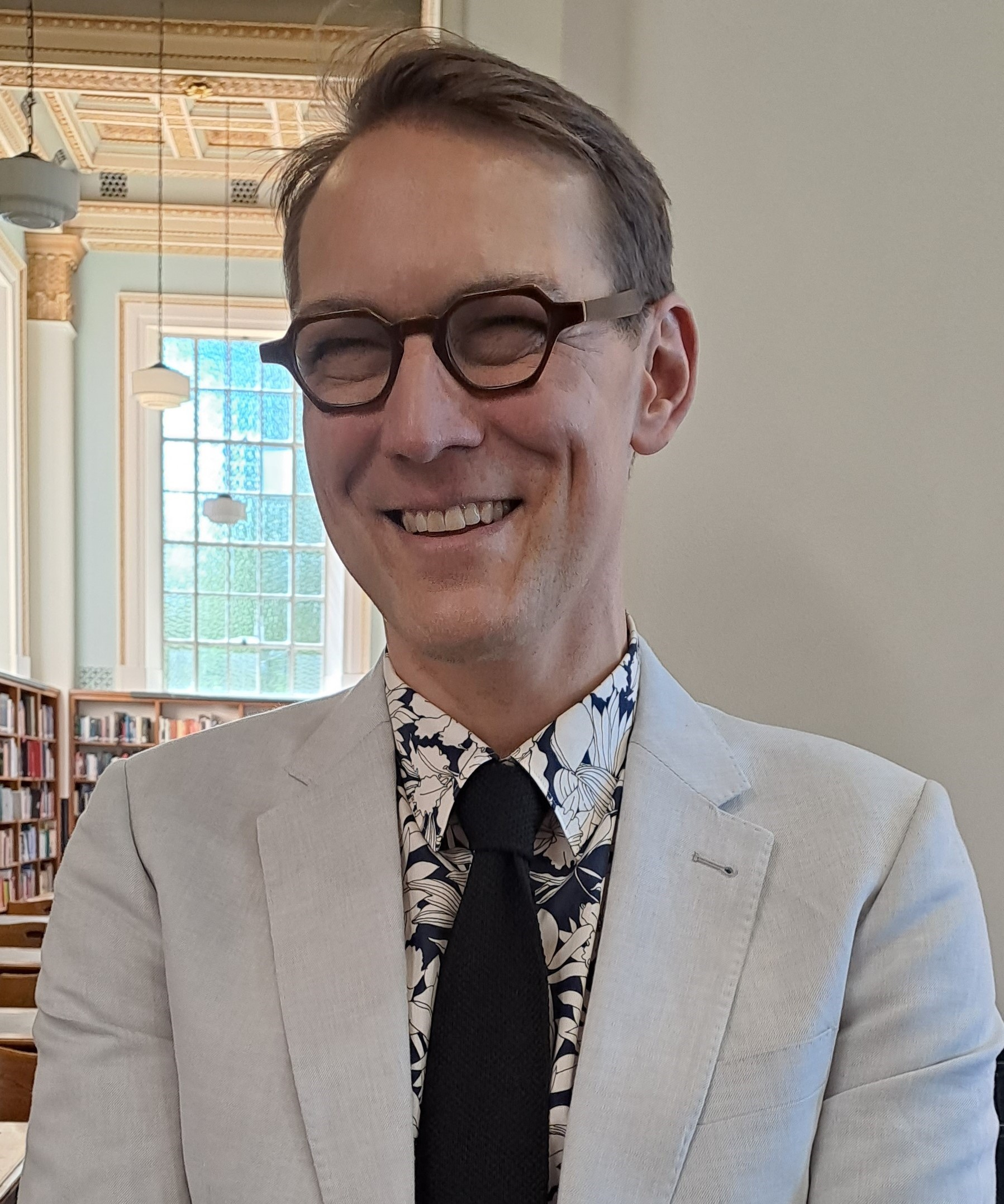
- Flanery in 2023
- Born: 1975 (age 50–51); California, U.S.
- Education: Tisch School of the Arts, New York University
- Occupations: Author; filmmaker; professor

Patrick Denman Flanery (born 1975) is an American author and academic. As of 2023 he is a chair of creative writing at the University of Adelaide in Adelaide, South Australia. He is known for his 2012 novel, Absolution.

== Early life and education ==
Patrick Denman Flanery was born in 1975 in California, the son of politically liberal parents, and grew up in Omaha, Nebraska, United States. He attended inner city de-segregated schools, "grew up with a consciousness of the problems of American race", and became aware of apartheid South Africa at an early age.

He graduated with a Bachelor of Fine Arts in Film and Television Production at the Tisch School of the Arts at New York University. He worked for some years as a freelance script reader for Sony Pictures Entertainment and then as literary scout for a film production company in New York City. The job entailed reading the best contemporary fiction, with the aim of determining whether it was suitable for adapting as a feature film.

In 2001, he moved to the U.K. At Oxford University, he earned a doctorate with a thesis about the publishing and adaptation histories of the novels of Evelyn Waugh, at the same time researching South African literature and film.

== Academic career ==
Flanery taught modern and contemporary literature and literary theory as an adjunct professor at the University of Sheffield in the UK from 2005 to 2009, and was also honorary fellow there at some point.

He taught at the University of Reading, and was professor of creative writing at the Queen Mary University of London from before 2012 (Note: This page refers to Flanery as a contributor to Print, Text and Book Cultures in South Africa (2012), by Andrew van der Vlies.) until around 2020.

As of 2023 he is chair of creative writing at the University of Adelaide, having joined the faculty in January 2021. He is also, concurrently, Professor Extraordinary in the English Department at the University of Stellenbosch.

== Writing career ==
Flanery has written the novels Absolution (2012), Fallen Land (2013), I Am No One (2016), and Night for Day (2019).

=== Novels ===
Flanery's debut novel, Absolution, weaves a story of South Africa's violent past and troubled present, built around a series of conversations between a reclusive novelist, Clare, and her official biographer Sam, an expatriate South African. Flanery said that "What I was trying to do in Absolution was suggest there was moral ambiguity on both sides, or at least that ordinary people had to make impossible choices". It was originally published in 2012 by Atlantic Books in the UK and Riverhead in the US and has since been translated into eleven languages. It won the Spear's First Best Book Award and was shortlisted for several other awards. A review in The Financial Times declared "Absolution serves as proof, if any were needed, that a novel can be both unashamedly literary and compellingly readable".

Taking up themes of the housing boom and bust, reparations for land stolen from black farmers, and creeping surveillance, Fallen Land was very much in tune with the Zeitgeist when it came out in 2013. James Bradley of The Washington Post noted that "it paints a chilling picture of a society deranged by violence, paranoia and its own fantasies of self-reliance". The story is told from the perspective of an elderly African American woman who is forced into selling her family farm.

Flanery's third novel, I Am No One, was released in 2016. This book is about a university professor who returns to New York after teaching at Oxford. Various disconcerting events convince him he is under surveillance and his privacy is being invaded by unknown people. It is written in the first person, which A.S. Byatt called "a big risk".

Night for Day was published in 2019. Set in Los Angeles in 1950, it follows two friends over the course of a day, during the McCarthy Communist witch hunts.

=== Other writing ===
A memoir, which Flanery described as "a hybrid creative-critical memoir", entitled The Ginger Child: On Family, Loss and Adoption, was published in 2019. It tells of the four-year quest by Flanery and his husband to adopt a child, relating the challenges of same-sex adoption.

His non-fiction essays, reviews, and interviews have appeared in The Los Angeles Times, The Spectator, The Times Literary Supplement, Newsweek, The Guardian, The Daily Telegraph, and Slightly Foxed. He has also written several articles on British and South African literature and film in academic journals.

=== Film ===
Flanery co-wrote a short drama film released in 2016, Three Days Gone.

In 2020 he wrote and directed a short documentary film, Sensitive Surfaces, about South African artist Kate Gottgens.

== Recognition and accolades ==
Flanery has had two writing fellowships in Italy: at the Bellagio Center (owned by the Rockefeller Foundation) in 2013, and the Santa Maddalena Foundation, (Note: Also known as the Gregor von Rezzori and Beatrice Monti della Corte Retreat for Writers; named after Gregor von Rezzori and his wife Beatrice Monti della Corte, who promoted and celebrated literature and art.) in the village of Donnini, near Florence, in 2013 and 2015.

He was also given a residency at MacDowell in Peterborough, New Hampshire in 2019, and at the Stellenbosch Institute for Advanced Study (Note: "STIAS was established in 1999 to provide a 'creative space for the mind', a fellowship programme that would advance cross-disciplinary research at the highest level.") in Stellenbosch, South Africa. His novels have appeared in translation in other languages.

Philip Gourevitch, writing in The New Yorker in 2012, called Flanery "an exceptionally gifted and intelligent novelist".

A. S. Byatt, in a review of I Am No One in The Guardian, wrote

One of the pleasures of reading Flanery is the tussle between ways of understanding the shapes of stories and language. He mixes, to quote an interview he gave, “expressionism, symbolism, surrealism” into what he calls "critical realism" – he writes realist novels which show their awareness that realism is a self-conscious form like others.

=== Awards ===
- 2012: Absolution, Winner, Spear's Best First Book Award, for Absolution
- 2012: Absolution Shortlisted, International IMPAC Dublin Literary Award
- 2012: Absolution Shortlisted, Royal Society of Literature's Ondaatje Prize
- 2012: Absolution Shortlisted, Flaherty-Dunnan First Novel Prize
- 2012: Absolution Shortlisted, Authors' Club First Novel Award
- 2016: I Am No One Shortlisted, Dublin Literary Award

== Personal life ==
Flanery's partner is (as of 2012) an academic who was born in Port Elizabeth, South Africa, so Flanery "spent a lot of time in South Africa with extended family and friends, and living in domestic spaces".
