= The Blind Man's Garden =

- First edition
- Author: Nadeem Aslam
- Language: English
- Genre: Historical novel, War novel
- Published: 2013
- Publisher: Faber & Faber
- Publication place: United Kingdom
- Media type: Print (Paperback)
- Pages: 367
- ISBN: 978-0345802859
- Preceded by: The Wasted Vigil

The Blind Man's Garden is a work of historical fiction that was published in 2013 by British Pakistani author Nadeem Aslam. This novel is his fourth publication and was shortlisted for the Ondaatje Prize in 2014. Its storyline is written from the perspective of a Pakistani family and details the events that ensued from the United States invasion of Afghanistan in October 2001.

== Historical context ==
The event leading up to America's invasion of Afghanistan was the terrorist attacks that took place in the United States on September 11th. (also known as 9/11) This assault was categorized by a string of four coordinated strikes carried out by Al Qaeda operatives, members of a militant group of non-state actors whose origin can be traced to Afghanistan. These individuals hijacked four commercial airplanes and used them as guided missiles, by crashing them into the North and South Towers of the World Trade Center, the Pentagon, and a field in Southern Pennsylvania. This assault resulted in nearly 3,000 casualties that caused lasting devastation to permeate throughout the nation. The night of the attacks President Bush vowed to "win the war against terrorism," and in a subsequent address to the Joint session of the 107th Congress he demanded that the Taliban "deliver to United States authorities all the leaders of al Qaeda who hide in your land...Our war on terror begins with al Qaeda, but it does not end there. It will not end until every terrorist group of global reach has been found, stopped and defeated." This speech previewed the establishment of a new cabinet: the Department of Homeland Security, and marked the beginning of the United States' campaign against terrorism known as the Global War on Terror. On September 18, 2001, just a week after the attacks, President Bush signed a joint resolution that sanctioned military action against the perpetrators of the calculated strike on American soil. On October 7, 2001 the United States invaded Afghanistan and commenced Operation Enduring Freedom, which initially comprised air-strikes on Taliban and Al Qaeda forces, and a small group of special operations forces.

== Synopsis ==
This novel details the events after the United States invaded Afghanistan and is set in post-9/11 Pakistan and Afghanistan. The narrative opens as Rohan and his son Jeo prepare for their journey to one of Pakistan's provincial capitals, Peshawar, to provide aid to the wounded who are being brought out of Afghanistan. Jeo, however, has other intentions and diverts from the plan. He ventures into Afghanistan with his (adopted) brother Mikal to assist the civilians who are caught in the conflict between the American soldiers and the Taliban. Unbeknownst to them, an ex-military officer seeking revenge against their father enacts a plot that will ensure their demise. Once they arrive in Afghanistan, the brothers are abandoned by their convoy and are forced to join the Taliban. Aslam's novel is a wrenching tale that illustrates lives upended by war, and the consequences of neo-orientalism from the standpoint of Eastern nations.

== Characters ==
=== Main ===
- Jeo: Rohan's son and Naheed's husband who was forced into the Taliban along with his foster brother. Jeo dies at the hands of a vengeful Afghan woman during the attack on the Taliban headquarters, which is led by American soldiers and spiteful Afghan citizens from nearby villages. Jeo's death is the first concrete sign that the war on terror has severe consequences; his death also allows estranged lovers Mikal and Naheed to be together.
- Mikal: Jeo's adopted brother and the love interest of Naheed. Mikal's parents died when he was a child and Rohan found him on a search for his late wife's painting. Mikal endures the most in this novel. After barely surfing the attack on Taliban headquarters he is taken by the Northern Alliance and held captive by a warlord who sells him to the Americans for upward of US$5,000. His experience with the Americans highlights the nature of their misguided justice.
- Rohan: Jeo's father, and the co-founder of the school Ardent Spirit, which he later relinquished to Ahmed the Moth after his wife's death. He was a very pious man who struggled with the death of his wife because she died an apostate. Rohan eventually becomes blind due to his proximity to an explosion and is the man whom the novel is named after.
- Naheed: Jeo's widow, who was in a relationship with Mikal before their union, never stopped loving Mikal and after Jeo's death, they had a child together. Her longing for Mikal's return maintains the underlying love story that is presented by this novel.
- Major Kyra: Ahmed the Moth's brother, an extremist, and former military officer who left the armed services following Pakistan's alignment with the West. He became the de facto owner of Ardent Spirit following his brother's death. Major Kyra viewed Rohan as an infidel and orchestrated Jeo and Mikal's forced induction into the Taliban, as a form of retaliation against him.

=== Supporting ===
- Sofia: The dead wife of Rohan and mother of Jeo. During her lifetime she was an artist and co-founder of Ardent Spirit. She is the reason for Rohan's guilt and why he is at peace with becoming blind, which he views as recompense for the way he treated his late wife.
- Tara: Naheed's mother. She was instrumental in preventing the relationship between Mikal and Naheed from blossoming.
- Basie: Mikal's older brother and Jeo's adopted brother. He married Jeo's sister and taught at St. Joseph's, a local Christian school that was seized by the jihadis of Ardent Spirit. Basie is the last connection that Mikal has to his birth family.
- Yasmine: Jeo's sister, and the widow of Basie. She was a teacher at St. Joseph's and bore Basie's child after his death.
- Ahmed the Moth: Kyra's brother and the former student of Rohan who was killed by a mob of civilians in Afghanistan. He inherited Ardent Spirit from Rohan and under his leadership, the school developed ties to ISI which selected certain students to become members of government-run jihadi camps.
- Ahmed: A pupil of Major Kyra's who modeled himself after Ahmed the Moth, and developed the plans for the siege of St. Joseph's.
- Father Mede: An Englishmen who was the headmaster and founder of St. Josephs. The jihadis of Ardent Spirit wanted to martyr him to draw attention from the Western media and get them to cease their invasion of Afghanistan. They thought this would be successful being that he was a white man, and these types of people always secure the attention of the West.

== Reception ==
Author James Lasdun writing in The Guardian said "By any measure The Blind Man's Garden is an impressive accomplishment." Professor Randy Boyagoda also praised the book in The Wall Street Journal, "For all the grinding misery that Mr. Aslam reveals in this devastated, and devastating, world, his most admirable characters retain their humanity enough to hope, just a little, for something better."
