= A Life Apart (novel) =

2008 novel by Neel Mukherjee

- A Life Apart, titled Past Continuous in the original release from 2008 in India
- Author: Neel Mukherjee
- Language: English
- Publication date: 2008
- Publication place: India
- ISBN: 978-0-393-35210-8

A Life Apart, titled Past Continuous in India, is a novel written by Neel Mukherjee. It was first published by Picador in India in 2008. It was later published in the UK as A Life Apart by Constable & Robinson in 2010. The author began writing the book in 2001 while taking a course in creative writing at the University of East Anglia.

It was published in the United States in 2016, by W. W. Norton & Company.

A review in The New Yorker described the novel as a "powerful mixture of comedy, revulsion, and grief." The main character, Ritwik Ghosh, a student on a scholarship at Oxford University, has a fetish for public toilets in St Giles. The contrasting narrative in the novel is of the other protagonist, Miss Gilby, an Englishwoman who goes to India in the early 20th century on a mission for the education of women. The two narratives are interleaved in alternating chapters till the end of the book.

The novel uses a narration technique in which although the characters are referred to in third person, the reader only sees what the two protagonists see. Los Angeles Review described the language of the book as dazzling and rich in metaphors.

== Awards ==
- 2008 Vodafone Crossword Book Award, English Fiction
