= Neel Mukherjee (writer) =

Indian English-language writer (born 1970)

Neel Mukherjee FRSL
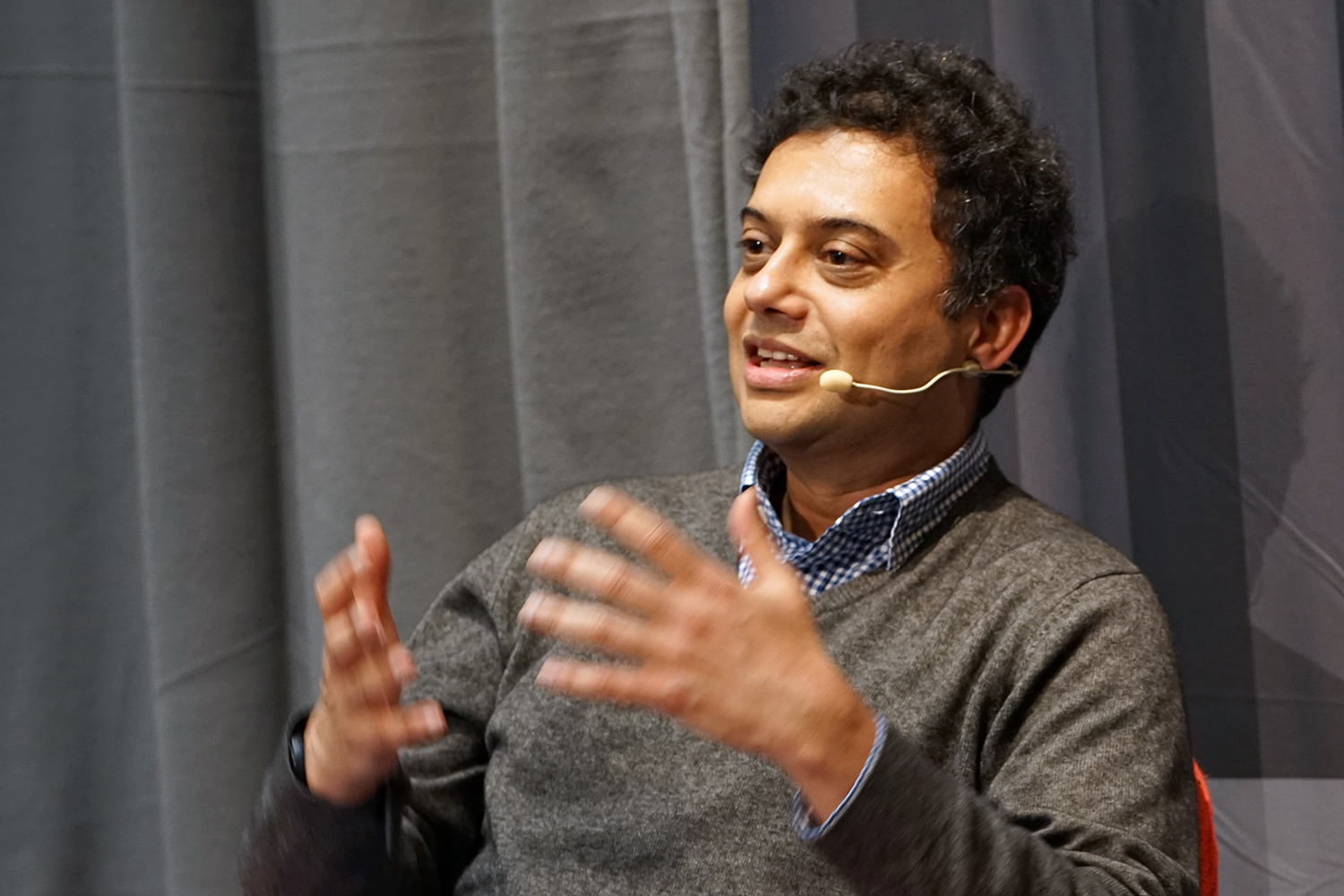
- Mukherjee (2018)
- Born: 1970 (age 55–56); Kolkata, West Bengal, India
- Citizenship: India
- Education: Jadavpur University (BA); University College, Oxford (BA); Pembroke College, Cambridge (PhD); University of East Anglia (MA)
- Occupation: Novelist
- Relatives: Udayan Mukherjee (brother)
- Writing career
- Language: English
- Notable works: A Life Apart, The Lives of Others
- Notable awards: Crossword Book Award (2008); Encore Award (2015)

Neel Mukherjee, FRSL (born 1970) is an Indian English-language novelist based in London and the US. His first novel, Past Continuous, won the Vodafone-Crossword Book Award in 2008. Under its UK title, A Life Apart, it won the Writers' Guild of Great Britain award for best fiction in 2010. His second novel, The Lives of Others, was shortlisted for the 2014 Man Booker Prize and won the Encore Award. He has also been shortlisted for the DSC Prize for South Asian Literature and the Goldsmiths Prize. He was elected a Fellow of the Royal Society of Literature in 2018.

== Life ==
Mukherjee was born in India in 1970. He was educated at Don Bosco School, Park Circus, Kolkata. He studied English at Jadavpur University and then attended University College, Oxford, on a Rhodes Scholarship, where he took a second BA in English, graduating in 1992. He completed a PhD on Edmund Spenser and the complaint form at Pembroke College, Cambridge, and went on to take a master's degree in creative writing at the University of East Anglia.

He has reviewed fiction for publications including The Times, the Sunday Telegraph, and Time Asia and has written articles for publications including The Times Literary Supplement, The Guardian, The New York Times, and the Boston Review.

He divides his time between London and the US, where he teaches at Harvard University.

Mukherjee is the brother of the television anchor and editor Udayan Mukherjee.

== Books ==
=== A Life Apart (India: Past Continuous) ===
Mukherjee started writing his debut novel while studying writing at the University of East Anglia. It was published in India by Picador in January 2008 as Past Continuous. It was published in the UK by Constable in January 2010 as A Life Apart. It tells the story of Ritwik, a young gay man who moves from an unhappy childhood in India to a scholarship at Oxford University. As his visa expires, he moves to London where he lives on the edges of society, working as a carer and moonlighting as a prostitute. Ritwik's narrative is interspersed with chapters from a novel he is writing, in which a minor character from a Tagore novel visits Bengal in the early 1900s.

As Past Continuous, the novel won the 2008 Vodafone Crossword Book Award for English Fiction in 2008, while Mukherjee won the GQ (India) Writer of the Year Award in 2009. As A Life Apart, the novel was shortlisted for the 2011 DSC Prize for South Asian Literature and won the Writers' Guild of Great Britain award for best fiction.

=== The Lives of Others ===
Mukherjee's second novel, The Lives of Others, published in 2014, is set in Kolkata in the late 1960s. Centering on the mill-owning Ghosh family, it continues Mukherjee's interest in inequality and those on the edge of society. It interweaves letters from eldest grandson Supratik, who has become involved in extremist political activism, with a detailed account of events in the household he has left behind, the turbulence of the family's lives mirroring that of society.

The novel won the 2014 Encore Award from the Royal Society of Literature for the best second novel. It was shortlisted for the 2014 Man Booker Prize. It was also shortlisted for the 2016 DSC Prize for South Asian Literature.

=== A State of Freedom ===
Mukherjee's third novel, A State of Freedom, was published in 2017. The prologue was published in Granta 130. The novel is set in India and interweaves the stories of five characters displaced by choice or circumstance, including a father on a visit home from the US, a construction worker, and a servant. Writing in The Guardian, Andrew Motion compared the novel's themes to those of British Victorian writers such as Dickens, founded "in the denunciation of injustice, and the valuing of compassion".

=== Choice ===
Published in 2024, Choice is structured as a triptych, with three thematically linked sections examining how personal decisions are influenced by broader economic and social forces. The first section follows Ayush, a London-based publisher, who becomes increasingly disillusioned with the capitalist structures that shape his life. The other sections pick up on small details in Ayush's narrative to tell the story of an academic who befriends an Eritrean Uber driver and of a family that falls apart after the gift of a cow.

Choice was shortlisted for the Goldsmiths Prize in 2024.
