= Nayanjot Lahiri =

Indian archeologist and historian

- Born: 1960 (age 65–66); Secunderabad, India
- Education: St. Stephen's College
- Known for: Professor of History and Archaeology
- Awards: John F. Richards Prize by the American Historical Association Infosys Prize
- Scientific career
- Fields: Ancient India, Archaeology, Indian History, Heritage Studies
- Workplaces: Ashoka University Hindu College University of Delhi

Nayanjot Lahiri (born 1960) is a renowned historian and archaeologist of ancient India.

She studied at St. Stephen’s College, Delhi, and at the Department of History, University of Delhi.

She has taught at Hindu College (1982–1993) and University of Delhi (1994–2016) is currently a professor of history at Ashoka University.

She is the winner of the 2013 Infosys Prize, in the humanities, for her work in archaeology and the 2016 awardee of the John F. Richards prize for her book Ashoka in Ancient India. She also served on the Humanities jury for the Infosys Prize from 2017 to 2018.

== Publications ==
- Pre-Ahom Assam: studies in the inscriptions of Assam between the fifth and the thirteenth centuries AD. Munshiram Manoharlal Publishers. 1991. ISBN 9788121504638.
- The Archaeology of the Indian Trade Route up to c. 200 B.C. Delhi: Oxford University Press. 1992. ISBN 9780195628142.
- The decline and fall of the Indus civilization. Permanent Black Orient Longman Ltd. 2000. ISBN 9788178240329.
- Marshalling the Past: ancient India and its modern histories. Permanent Black. 2012. ISBN 9788178243481.
- With Singh, Upinder, eds. (2010). Ancient India: new research. New Delhi: Oxford University Press. ISBN 9780198068303.
- Finding Forgotten Cities: How the Indus Civilization was discovered. Hachette India. 2012. ISBN 9789350094198.
- Ashoka in Ancient India. Harvard University Press. 2015. ISBN 9780674057777.
- With Singh, Upinder, eds. (2016). Buddhism in Asia: Revival and Reinvention. New Delhi: Manohar Publishers. ISBN 9789350981160.
- Monuments matter: India's archaeological heritage since Independence. Marg Foundation. 2017. ISBN 9789383243174.
- Time Pieces: A Whistle-stop Tour of Ancient India. Hachette India. 2018. ISBN 9789351952473.
- Nayanjot, Lahiri (2021). Archaeology and the Public Purpose: Writings on and by M. N. Deshpande. New Delhi: Oxford University Press. ISBN 9780190130480.
