= Flood of Fire =

2015 novel by Amitav Ghosh

- Flood of Fire book cover
- Author: Amitav Ghosh
- Language: English
- Series: Ibis trilogy
- Genre: Novel
- Publisher: John Murray
- Publication date: 28 May 2015
- Publication place: India
- Media type: Print (hardback)
- Pages: 624
- ISBN: 978-0-670-08216-2
- Preceded by: River of Smoke

Flood of Fire is a 2015 novel by Indian novelist Amitav Ghosh. Following the Sea of Poppies (2008) and River of Smoke (2011), the novel is the final installment of the Ibis trilogy, which concerns the 19th-century opium trade between India and China. The book was first published by the English publisher John Murray, and later by Farrar, Straus and Giroux in the United States. The novel was shortlisted for The Hindu Literary Prize and received the Crossword Book Jury Award in Fiction in 2015.

== Plot ==
Following the storylines of the previous two parts, Sea of Poppies and River of Smoke, the story continues in 1839. Kesri Singh, brother of Deeti, is made aware that Deeti ran away from her husband's pyre by avoiding sati. She eloped with a lower-caste labourer and Singh's family is ashamed of the events. Kesri joins the British service as an Indian soldier at the rank of sepoy. He works for the East India Company, where his superior is Deeti's deceased husband's brother. Zachary Reid, an American soldier born to a quadroon mother and a white father, pretends to be white and starts entering the trading business. Shireen Modi, an Indian Parsi woman, has left for China in search of her late husband's illegitimate child. In her pursuit, she starts to have feelings for her husband's close friend who is now helping her. She is fully aware that her relationship with this Armenian friend would be condemned by her orthodox Parsi community. Neel Rattan Halder, once a king, has been separated from his son after he was arrested by the British. Neel has now absconded and remains a fugitive in order to avoid being jailed for his conviction on the false forgery charges, which Mr. Burnham had manipulated. The First Opium War has commenced and the characters find themselves in midst of these events.

== Development and publication ==
Ghosh started working on the trilogy in 2004 but mentioned that he had conceptualised it after he finished his 2000 novel The Glass Palace. He visited various places in China, Hong Kong, and Singapore to gather research material. By the time Flood of Fire was published, Amitav had published seven novels, which included two initial parts of this trilogy and five non-fictional works.

Along with English, the characters in the book converse in other languages like Bengali, Cantonese, and Gujarati, and make use of the ornate dialect and the colloquial sailor terminology. The book was first published by the English publisher John Murray on 28 May 2015, and later by Farrar, Straus and Giroux in the United States. Maps in the book were drawn by Rodney Paull.

Flood of Fire is the last installment of Ghosh's Ibis trilogy and deals with events between 1839 and 1841. Rebutting all rumours, Ghosh confirmed in one of the book launch events that it is the last of the Ibis trilogy. In an interview, Ghosh mentioned that he used to feel "devastated" after completing a book. So, he decided to write a trilogy so that he "could stay with the characters for a long time". Ghosh mentioned that he felt "an incredible sense of fulfilment" and expressed that with the trilogy, he achieved what he wanted to.

== Critical reception ==
The book received favourable reviews. Simar Bhasin of Hindustan Times appreciated "Ghosh's play with language" and mentioned that "the research done by the author and its consequent treatment is close to flawless". She further noted that the language would be challenging "for a reader who is unacquainted with 'Hindustani' and therefore many such phrases and double meanings would be lost on them". Nilanjana Roy of Business Standard called the novel as "a brisk read for all of the dense historical research and period detail crammed into these 616 pages" and mentioned that "the strongest criticism of the Ibis trilogy is that it sometimes reads like a historical novel of that period, not just a historical novel about that period". South China Morning Post gave the novel five out of five stars, saying "few writers have combined popular and literary styles in a Hong Kong-set book better than Amitav Ghosh".

Mark Thomas of The Sydney Morning Herald reviewed the book as "an exceptionally well-read novel" and noted that Ghosh has kept the fortunes of characters as a mystery. Wendy Smith of the Los Angeles Times also noted that Ghosh did not wrap up the trilogy, "leaving in transition many people to whom we have grown attached over the course of three novels". She considers this as "a mark of his artistry that this ending, though in some ways inconclusive, nonetheless feels satisfying and right".

Aram Bakshian, a former speechwriter for Presidents of the United States Richard Nixon, Gerald Ford, and Ronald Reagan, in his The Washington Times review called the book as "a truly grand tamasha" while noting the "only downside is [Ghosh]'s tendency to get a bit preachy from time to time". Alex Clark of The Guardian reviewed the book as "high seriousness and low humour drive"; Katherine Powers of Chicago Tribune considered the book as "the best of the three volumes".

== Awards ==
In 2015, the novel received the Crossword Book Jury Award in fiction category whereas the Scion of Ikshvaku by Amish Tripathi won the popular choice award in fiction category. It was also shortlisted for The Hindu Literary Prize which was eventually presented to Easterine Kire for her novel When the River Sleeps narrating the story of a hunter who is on a mission single-handedly looking for a powerful stone in a faraway river, which will make him omnipotent.
