= All the Lives We Never Lived =

Novel by Anuradha Roy

- First edition cover by Monica Reyes Alvarez
- Author: Anuradha Roy
- Cover artist: Monica Reyes Alvarez
- Language: English
- Set in: Muntazir, India
- Publisher: Hachette India
- Publication date: 14 May 2018
- Publication place: India
- Media type: Print (hardback)
- Pages: 336
- Awards: Sahitya Akademi Award (2022)
- ISBN: 9789351952381

All the Lives We Never Lived is a novel by Anuradha Roy which was published on 14 May 2018 by Hachette India. In 2022, it was awarded the Sahitya Akademi Award.

== Plot ==
The novel is about Myshkin and his mother Gayatri who was an artist. His mother abandons the family for chasing of freedom. In that time, Nazism came in power then an artist from Gayatri's past who was a German seeks her out.

== Critical reception ==
Kamila Shamsie of The Guardian wrote "Roy's novel is a beautifully written amalgam of fictional and famous lives grappling with love and loss", Seán Hewitt of The Irish Times wrote "The scope of All the Lives We Never Lived is vast but also personal, both in temporal and geographical terms.", Fathima M of The Wire wrote "this extraordinary novel has figured on many short or long 'lists' this season of literary prizes, it must be read, if nothing else, for its artistic value.", Chandrima S. Bhattachary of The Telegraph wrote "Each word in Anuradha Roy's novel hits the right note. But the book has its flaws" and Leah Franqui of The New York Times wrote "All the Lives We Never Lived" feels more like a rumination than a story.".

The book has also been reviewed by Ron Charles of The Washington Post, Hansda Sowvendra Shekhar of The Hindu, Erica Pearson of Star Tribune and Naina Bajekal of Time.

== Awards ==
- Sahitya Akademi Award in 2022
- Shortlisted for International Dublin Literary Award in 2020
- Shortlisted for The Hindu Literary Prize in 2018
- Longlisted for Walter Scott Prize in 2019
- Longlisted for JCB Prize in 2018
- Fiction book of the year by Tata Literature Live Awards in 2018
