= Dwaipayan Bhattacharyya =

Indian political scientist

Academic work
- Notable works: Government as Practice: Democratic Left in a Transforming India

Dwaipayan Bhattacharyya is an Indian political scientist. He is a professor at Centre for Political Studies, Jawaharlal Nehru University.

== Education ==
Dwaipayan did his PhD on Agrarian reforms and the politics of the left in West Bengal from University of Cambridge.

== Career ==
Dwaipayan Bhattacharyya taught political science at Jawaharlal Nehru University (from1994-2002 and 2016–present) and at Centre for Studies in Social Sciences, Calcutta (2002-2015). He specialises in Indian politics, Left politics, analysis of power and institutions, and social hierarchies. He has held visiting positions at Claremont University, USA; Massey University, New Zealand; and Göttingen University, Germany.

He had collaborated with various projects including, ‘Democracy and Social Capital in Segmented Societies’ with SIDA and Uppsala University, Sweden during 1996–99, ‘Political Ethnography of West Bengal Villages’, ‘Understanding Political Changes in Rural West Bengal’ with Indian Statistical Institute, Kolkata and Boston University, USA during 2005 and 2012–13, ‘Embedding Poor People’s Voices in Local Governance’, with University of Sheffield, United Kingdom and Centre for Development Studies, Kerala during 2008–09. From 2016 onwards, he is the member of the International Centre for Advanced Studies ‘Metamorphoses of the Political’ (ICAS:MP), a consortium of seven Indian and German partners, funded by the German Ministry of Education and Research (BMBF).

He theorised West Bengal's unique history of affiliation to political parties and polarisation along party lines. He coined the term “party society” in this context He argues that politics in west Bengal spins not on caste, religious or ethnic associations, but on their absorption within this or that political party.

== Awards and honours ==
- Nehru Trust for Cambridge University Fellowship
- Fulbright Fellowship (Scholar-in-Residence)
- British Chevening Fellowship
- Churchill College Honorary Fellowship
- DAAD Fellowship

== Key Publications ==
=== Books ===
1) Government as Practice: Democratic Left in a Transforming India (New Delhi: Cambridge University Press) 2016.

2) Interrogating Social Capital: The Indian Experience (edited with Niraja Gopal Jayal, Sudha Pai and Bishnu N. Mohapatra), (New Delhi, Sage), 2004.

=== Book chapters ===
- 'Left in the Lurch: The Demise of the World's Longest Elected Regime? (with an Epilogue)', in Sudha Pai (ed.) Handbook of Politics in Indian States: Region, Parties and Economic Reforms, (New Delhi: Oxford University Press), 2013.
- ‘Party-society, its Consolidation and Crisis: Understanding Political Change in West Bengal’, in Anjan Ghosh, Tapati Guha-Thakurta and Janaki Nair (ed.), Theorizing the Present: Essays for Partha Chatterjee (New Delhi: Oxford University Press), 2011, 226- 250.
- ‘West Bengal: Permanent Incumbency and Political Stability’ in Sandeep Shastri, K C Suri and Yogendra Yadav (ed.), Electoral Politics in Indian States: Lok Sabha Elections in 2004 and Beyond (New Delhi: Oxford University Press), 2009, 326–45.
- ‘Politics of middleness: the changing character of the Communist Party of India (Marxist) in Rural West Bengal (1977-1990)’ in Sugata Bose, Barbara Harriss, Ben Rogaly (eds), Sonar Bangla? Agricultural Growth and Agrarian Change in West Bengal and Bangladesh (New Delhi: Sage), 1999.
- ‘How to Govern the Poor? The Role of Social Policies in Economic Transformation’, in Nandini Gooptu and Jonathan Parry (ed.s), Persistence of Poverty in India, Social Science Press, New Delhi, 2014, 370–431.
- Social Policy in India: Education Reform and Employment Guarantee in a Rapidly Changing Economy’, in Samir Kumar Das (ed.) ICSSR Research Surveys and Explorations: Political Science: Volume – 1 (New Delhi: Oxford University Press), 2012, 111–144.
- Strengthening Rural Decentralisation, Centre for Studies in Social Sciences, Calcutta (with Partha Chatterjee, Pranab Kumar Das, Dhrubajyoti Ghosh, Manabi Majumdar and Surajit Mukhopadhyay) 2006.
- ‘Writers’ Buildings and the reality of decentralised rural power: some paradoxes in West Bengal’ in Niraja Gopal Jayal, Amit Prakash & Pradeep Sharma, ed., Local Governance in India: Decentralisation and Beyond (New Delhi: Oxford University Press), 2006.
- ‘Agrarian reforms and panchayati raj in West Bengal’ in Ashish Ghosh and Neera Chandhoke (eds.), Grassroots movement and social change (DCRC, Delhi University Press), 1995, 117–123.

=== Journal articles ===
He has multiple publications in peer reviewed international and national journals including Journal of Development Studies, Economic and Political Weekly, Calcutta Historical Review etc.
