= Smoke and Ashes =

2023 book by Amitav Ghosh

Smoke and Ashes: Opium's Hidden Histories
- Author: Amitav Ghosh
- Language: Non-fiction
- Publication date: 2023
- ISBN: 978-93-5699-275-7

Smoke and Ashes: Opium's Hidden Histories is a 2023 non-fiction book by Amitav Ghosh. The book arose from research Ghosh conducted on the historical opium trade and its relation to India and China while he was writing his fiction novel series, the Ibis trilogy. In it, Ghosh discusses the history of tea, the Opium Wars and links between colonialism and the modern opioid crisis.

== Summary ==
In chapter one, "Here Be Dragons", Amitav Ghosh explains that he was born in India, which borders China. However, he did not have any interest in Chinese culture until he travelled there to research his novel Sea of Poppies. Then he realizes his tea, cup, tray, sugar and many other things are all originally from China. This fact leads him to find out his tight connection with China in real life.

Chapter two, "Seeds", discusses the importance of tea to Britain around the eighteenth century. At that time, tea was grown only in China. But demand for tea in Britain high. It was an important source of revenue for the East India Company, and for the British government: "through much of the eighteenth and nineteenth centuries, the tax on tea accounted for nearly a tenth of Britain’s revenues". Since China had little demand for British goods, this led Britain to run a large trade deficit with China.

In chapter three, "An Actor in Its Own Right", Ghosh introduces the idea that the poppy itself shaped history. Using ideas about the agency of plants, he argues that opium influenced human decisions, trade routes, wars, and empires rather than being just an object people controlled. The chapter encourages readers to think about history as involving not only people but also powerful natural forces.

Chapter four is entitled "Frenemies", referring to how "throughout the 1600s and even afterwards, the Dutch and the English were the most intimate of enemies". It discusses how European merchants—initially from the Netherlands—encouraged the spread of recreational opium-use in South-East and later East Asia. It discusses how traditional opium-production was centred on the Gangetic Plain in India, and how the East India Company decided to expand its opium sales in China in order to address its balance of payments difficulties with China, despite the fact that opium had been banned there since 1729.

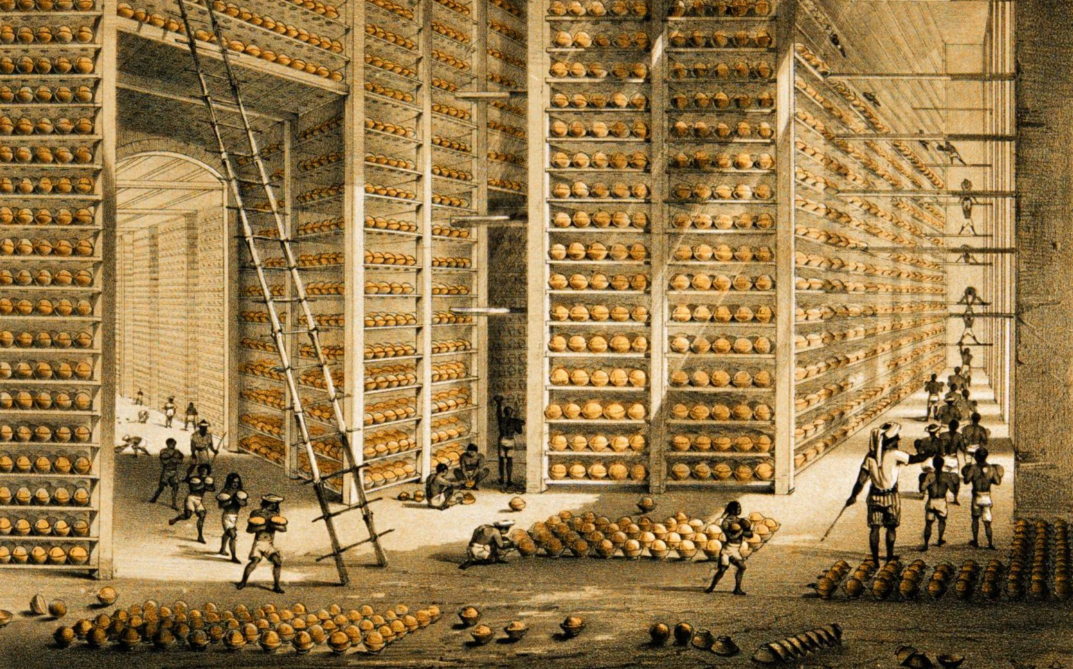
W. S. Sherwill's portrayal of a stacking room in the Patna opium factory, analysed by Ghosh in chapter six.

Chapters five and six focus on opium production in India. The former, "The Opium Department", gives a detailed account of how opium-poppies were farmed in India under British rule. It argues that opium-growing was loss-making for farmers even while it produced great riches for Europeans, and that the poor economic development of the Indian state of Bihar in the present partly arose from how the East India Company exploited that region. Chapter six, "Big Brother", goes on to give a detailed account of how opium was produced in the Company's factories at Patna and Ghazipur, and sketches how it was smuggled into China.

Chapter 7, "Visions", focuses on trying to understand nineteenth-century opium production through close analysis of the art of Sita Ram and Shiva Lal (and by contrasting this with the portrayals of opium factories by Walter Stanhope Sherwill considered in chapter 6).

In chapter 8, "Family Story", Ghosh reflects on his discovery that his paternal ancestors had migrated from Bengal to Chhapra in Bihar and there worked as bureaucrats in the opium industry; the chapter also draws on Pandey Kapil's historical novel Phoolsunghi.

Chapters nine ("Malwa") and ten ("East and West") explain how the western region of India called Malwa, which came under British control later than Bihar, began to compete with the East India Company to export opium to China, and how that was one reason why the East India Company worked to bring western India under its control. It argues that "the fortunes of modern Mumbai were largely shaped by opium, and by China". Chapter ten argues that in eastern India, where the East India Company's power was strong, the opium industry served to extract wealth from India to Britain, limiting local economic development, whereas in western India, where the East India Company had less power, capital accrued from opium exports were invested to develop the local economy. "So", writes Ghosh, "while Bombay prospered, Calcutta’s economy remained quintessentially colonial, structured around racial and communal hierarchies, and dependent on agricultural products [...] all wrung out of the soil by underpaid and ill-used workers. [...] Mumbai became the country’s economic and financial powerhouse, while Calcutta became the hotbed of India’s radicalism, as well as a hub for the academic discipline of economics. Mumbai, it could be said, got the economy, while Calcutta got the economists".

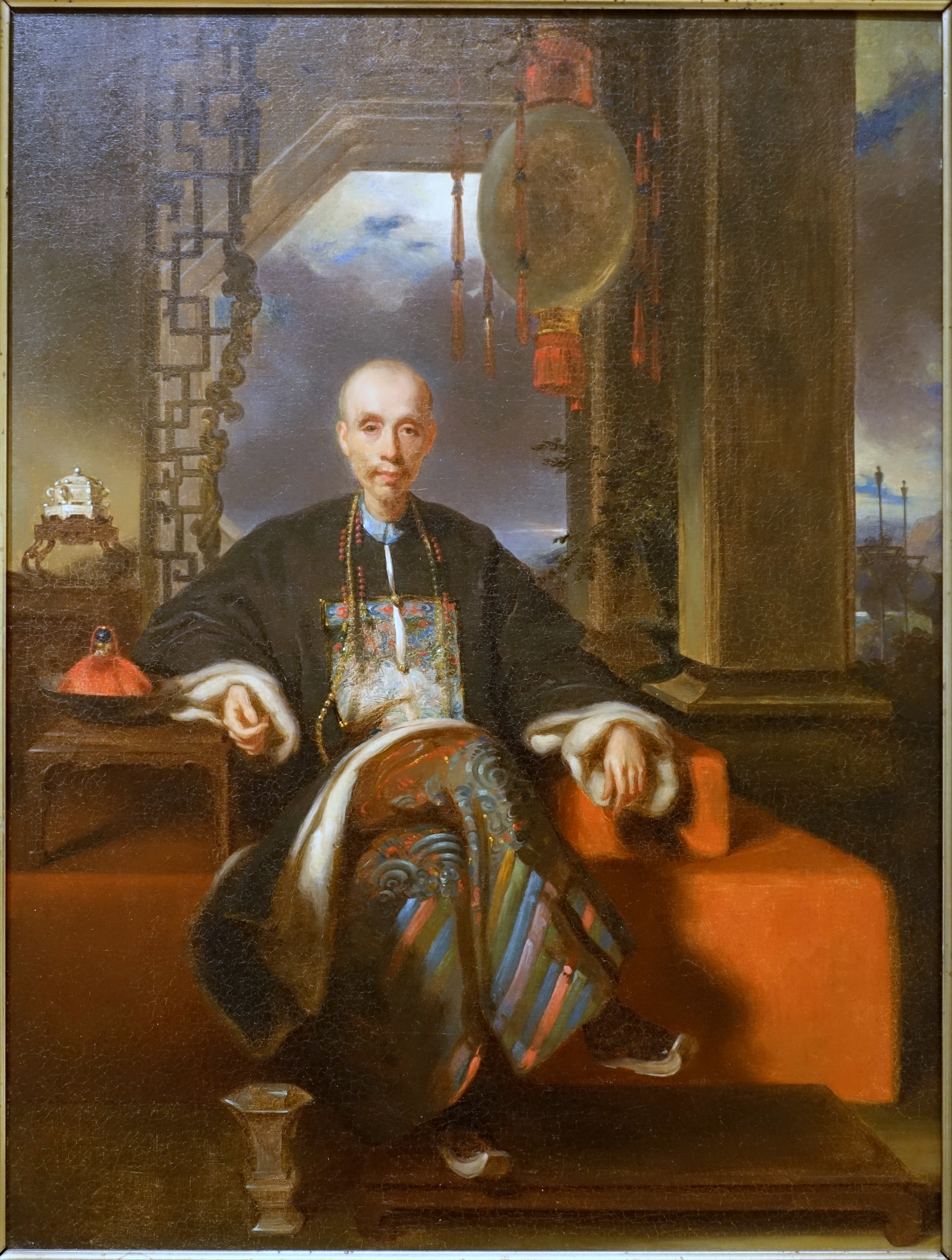
Wu Bingjian, whose patronage of American opium-smugglers and investment in American railroads is discussed by Ghosh.

Chapter eleven, "Diasporas", contemplates the diasporic communities formed by merchants in the opium trade. Although it includes Armenian and Baghdadi Jewish merchants, and the development of Singapore and Macao, it focuses on Parsi merchants in Guangzhou’s Foreign Enclave, and what life was like in its unusual community.

Chapters twelve to thirteen focus on the role of the opium trade in the economic development of the USA. The former, "Boston Brahmins", recounts how a newly independent USA expanded into the opium trade with China, partly by bringing Turkish supplies to the East Asian market. The chapters demonstrates how much of the wealth of prestigious New England families derives from opium; how "Canton graduates" returned to the USA from China with new experience of international trade, networks, and sources of capital; and how much of the colonisation of the USA was capitalised by opium wealth and the foreign direct investment of Wu Bingjian. The chapter even argues that trade with China encouraged the westward expansion of the USA in search of better access to the Pacific Ocean. The chapters also trace the embarrassment of Christian American merchants involved in an illicit drug trade and how they variously justified and covered up their actions to US audiences, along with the opposition to the trade of Olyphant & Co. and Charles W. King.

Chapter fourteen, "Guangzhou", positions the cosmopolitan environment of Guangzhou as the medium through which much Chinese influence on South Asian and Western art and horticulture travelled.

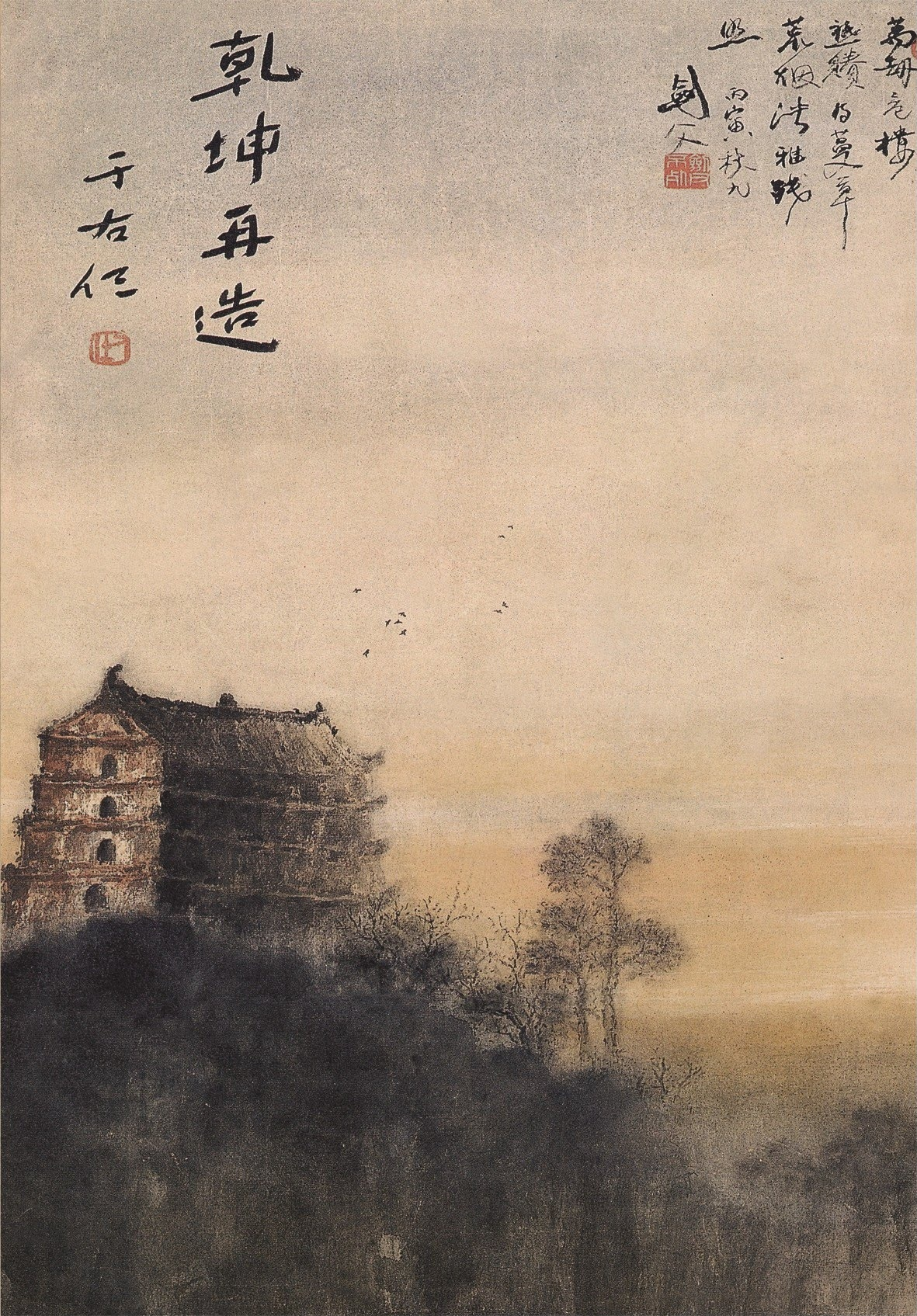
Gao Jianfu, "Twilight at Zhenhai Tower" (1926)

Chapter fifteen, "The Sea-Calming Tower", takes its name from Zhenhai Tower in Guangzhou, which was the site of a key battle during the First Opium War, the Sanyuanli Incident. As well as recounting China's defeat there, the chapter focuses on the role of South Asian sepoys there, and the failure of Chinese strategists to drive a wedge between British and South Asian interest groups.

Chapter sixteen, "Pillar of Empire", compares the addictiveness of opium and its tendency to create ever-growing demand—and so the immorality of exporting opium to China—to the later US opioid epidemic, caused by Purdue Pharma (and its owners the Sackler family) promoting the addictive opioid OxyContin. It notes how OxyContin sales in 1996 were worth $48 million but after four years their value was $11 billion (2192% growth). Similarly, over 101 years, the number of boxes the East India Company sold to China rose from 200 chests to 30000 chests (14900% growth). Ghosh discusses how both nineteenth-century thinkers and modern historians have attempted to legitimise this destructive trade, partly due to its huge economic role in the British Empire.

Chapter seventeen, "Parallels", discusses how South-East and East-Asian polities, unable to prevent opium-smuggling by Western and South Asian merchants, eventually promoted local opium-production in the hope of supplanting this trade, and how they found that increasing supply in fact led to continued increases in demand. Ghosh continues to develop comparisons with the US opioid epidemic.

Chapter eighteen, "Portents", explores opposition to the opium trade, and how "by the 1890s anti-opium sentiment had coalesced into a global movement, with a substantial representation in legislatures across Europe and America. At the same time opioids were also becoming a matter of concern for European colonial authorities now that China itself had emerged as the world’s largest producer of opium and heroin: criminal networks, of the kind that had previously carried drugs into China, were now smuggling them into Southeast Asia, India and, increasingly, Europe". Comparing the ruthlessness of opium-sellers with climate-change denial among present-day corporations, Ghosh concludes that "the success of the anti-opium movement in building a transnational coalition of civil society organizations and religious groups, many of which did not see eye to eye on any other matter, suggests that such a strategy might also work in relation to energy corporations today".

== Reception ==
Sharmila Narayana states her opinion about the book Smoke and Ashes: "Smoke and Ashes is another addition to Ghosh’s oeuvre that renders a timely warning: if left unchecked, the poppy plant could be humanity’s nemesis." Animesh Roy found that the book offers "a paradigm-shifting intervention into the understanding of global history, colonial modernity, and the ongoing planetary crisis by centering the opium poppy as a dynamic nonhuman actant" and that "the poppy's 'cycles of repetition,' echoing from the Opium Wars to the contemporary American opioid epidemic, serve as a stark reminder that the roots of our present predicaments are deeply embedded in the soil of colonial history, and that any genuine effort to decolonize our future must begin by acknowledging the agential force of the nonhuman world that has so long been rendered invisible".
