= The Ten Percent Thief =

- Author: Lavanya Lakshminarayan
- Language: English
- Genre: Science fiction
- Publication date: 2023
- Publication place: United Kingdom
- ISBN: 978-1-78618-854-0

The Ten Percent Thief is a 2023 dystopian science fiction novel by Indian author Lavanya Lakshminarayan, published by Solaris. It was originally published in India in 2020 by Hachette India under the title Analog/Virtual: And Other Simulations of Your Future. The novel was shortlisted for the Arthur C. Clarke award in 2024. Set in a future Bangalore, renamed Apex City, it explores the lives of the people governed by Bell Corporation, which divides its citizens into two categories: the Analogs and the Virtuals. The novel depicts the subsequent conflict between the two.

== Plot summary ==
The Ten Percent Thief is a mosaic novel, and consists of twenty interconnected stories narrated from the perspectives of various characters. It begins by introducing the two sides of Apex City, the Analog and the Virtual, being separated by an electric shield called the Carnatic Meridian. In the story the Bell Corp governs the city based on a system of merit and productivity measured by an algorithm called the Bell Curve. The people of the Analog world are used to face-to-face conversations and use paper money. They lack the privileges of running water and electricity. On the other side, the Virtual world is characterized by the use of a digital currency called Bellcoin, advanced Holographic and climate control technologies, patrol-droids, bots, and artificial intelligence. The Virtuals of this city-state are ranked on the basis of their productivity and their social persona affected by the virality of their social media posts. The highest rankers belong to the Twenty Percent; the middle rankers, the Seventy Percent, have basic amenities; and people with decreased productivity fall into the Ten Percent. The stories show how people failing to meet the Bell Corporation's standards are deported to the vegetable farm on the Analog side where they are at risk of being "harvested".

The latter part of the novel depicts the rebellion of the Analogs against Bell Corp, particularly by a secret community called the "resistance" or the Electric Underground. Under the leadership of the eponymous character the Ten Percent Thief and Suzarein Rasae, they attack the Virtuals by drawing them to a secret location, the Old Temple, causing the deaths of many Virtual and Analog warriors. At the end of the novel, they hack the Bell Corp's digital cloud called the Nebula with the help of their own network called the Jewel Forest, built by metal scraps collected from the Junkyard, thereby crashing the whole system and anticipating a new social order.

== Characters ==
- Ten Percent Thief: Also referred to in the novel as Nayaka, she is the leader of the Analog rebels.
- John Alvares: A chief member of the policy and governance division of Bell Corp.
- Op.He.Li.aA: An AI companion which monitors and controls the thoughts of John including his social media content for his increased performance in the Bell Corp.
- Arun: An Analog teenager who joins the "resistance" against the Virtuals.
- Marie: An engineer who plays the key role in creating the Jewel Forest.
- Rohini (Ro): Another member of the Electric Underground.
- Anita: Formerly a Virtual, she is relegated to be an Analog due to her decreased productivity.
- Sasha: A Virtual worker, who is also deported to the Analog world.
- Teresa: A tour guide who guides the Virtual children in their tour around the Analog world.
- Tariq: An Analog activist.
- Tanvi: Belongs to the top twenty percent of the Bell Curve. A popular social figure criticized for her choice regarding childbirth.
- Nina: An Analog-born pianist who struggles to learn piano due to the inaccessibility of technology.
- Suzarein Rasae: One of the leaders of the Analog.

== Themes ==
The novel has themes of surveillance, hyperreality, identity, class division, social inequality, climate crisis, corporate authority and rebellion.

Surveillance: In the novel, Bell Corp uses PanoptiCams and patrol-droids to monitor external circumstances, and AI companions like M.I.M.E.S.I.S. and Op.He.Li.aA to control thought processes and physiological changes such as adrenaline and cortisol levels within the body.

Identity: In the story "Avatar", a girl's avatar in a video game becomes her sole social identity. She intends to hide her real self and wears her avatar in front of her audience when nominated for the Influencer of the Year Award.

Social inequality: The Virtuals and the Analogs represent the haves and have-nots respectively.

== Awards ==
The novel was shortlisted for the Arthur C. Clarke award in 2024.
