= Anuradha Roy =

Anuradha Roy may refer to:

- Anuradha Roy (novelist) (born 1967), Indian novelist, journalist and editor
- Anuradha Roy (actress), Indian actress
