= Ibis trilogy =

Work of historical fiction by Amitav Ghosh

- Sea of Poppies (2008); River of Smoke (2011); Flood of Fire (2015)
- Author: Amitav Ghosh
- Country: India
- Language: English
- Genre: Historical fiction
- Publisher: Penguin Books
- Media type: Print (hardback & paperback); Audiobook; E-book
- No. of books: 3
- Website: www.amitavghosh.com

The Ibis trilogy is a work of historical fiction by Indian writer Amitav Ghosh, consisting of the novels Sea of Poppies (2008), River of Smoke (2011) and Flood of Fire (2015). A work of postcolonial literature, the story is set across the Indian Ocean region during the 1830s in the lead-up to the First Opium War. It particularly focuses on the trade of opium between India and China and the trafficking of girmityas to Mauritius. The series has received critical acclaim and academic attention for its historical research, themes and ambition. A television series adaptation was announced to be in development in 2019. Ghosh released a 2023 non-fiction book Smoke and Ashes based on his research from the writing of the series.

== Synopsis ==
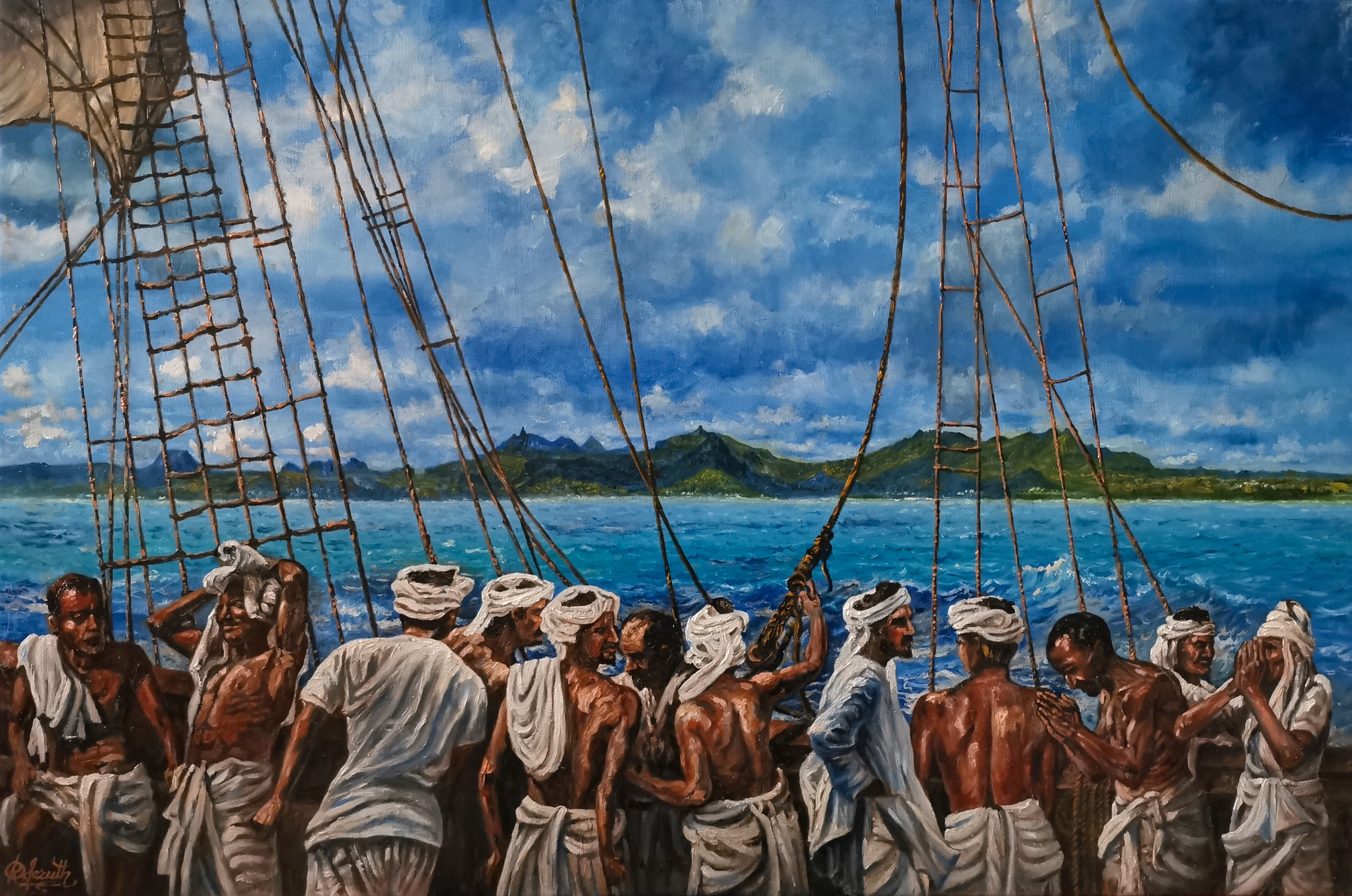
Depiction of indentured labourers being transported to Mauritius in 1834, as depicted in the series

The trilogy gets its names from the Ibis, a schooner slave ship that is repurposed to transport opium and girmityas. Most of the main characters meet for the first time on the ship. The series is set during the 1830s across the Indian Ocean region amid the build-up to the First Opium War. The series follows a nonlinear narrative.

In Sea of Poppies, the Ibis sets off from Calcutta carrying indentured servants and convicts destined for Mauritius, but runs into a major storm and faces a mutiny. River of Smoke is set in China — particularly around the Thirteen Factories — at opium's destination, where tensions between local authorities and international traders begin to escalate. The second instalment follows the inhabitants of two other ships caught in the same storm as the Ibis — the Anahita, a vessel carrying opium to Canton, and the Redruth, which is on a botanical expedition, also to Canton. Flood of Fire culminates in the outbreak of the First Opium War and its impact across the Indian Ocean region, including leading to the foundation of Hong Kong.

The novels depict a range of characters from different cultures, ethnicities, social classes and genders. This includes Bihari peasants, Bengali Zamindars and traders and officials of British, Chinese and Parsi descent. In addition to their native tongues, the novels also introduce the readers to various pidgins, including the original Chinese Pidgin English and variants spoken by the lascars. Pidgins are used as a common language spoken by characters of different nationalities, particularly in the naval profession.

== Historical background ==
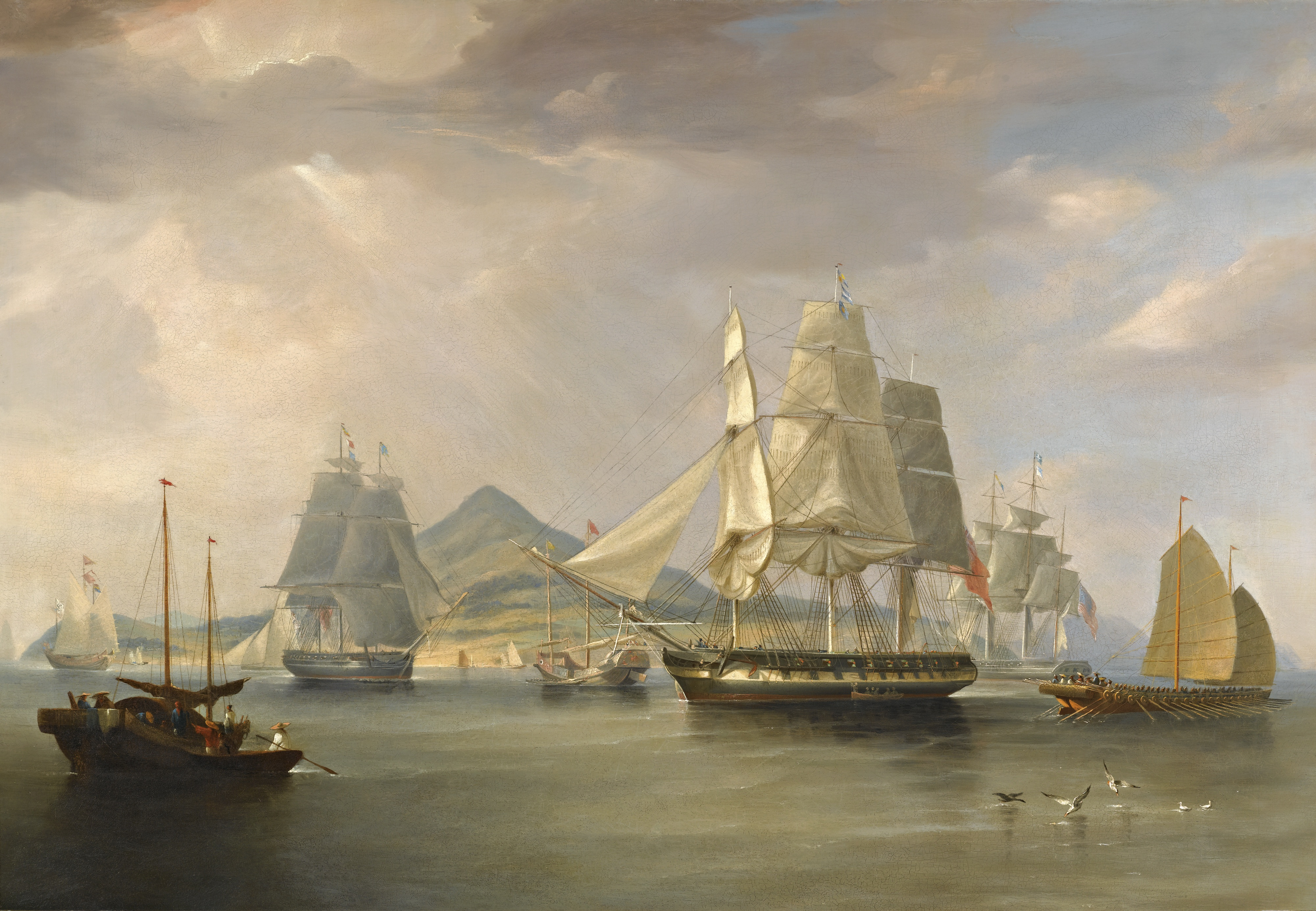
Depiction of British opium ships off the coast of China in 1824 by William John Huggins. This period of history provides the inspiration for the Ibis trilogy.

The Ibis trilogy is set to the backdrop of the opium trade in China during the 1830s, which was causing widespread addiction in the country, but was a lucrative endeavour for British and American merchants. After diplomatic attempts to end it failed, in 1839, Chinese Commissioner Lin Zexu ordered a ban on the trade and the destruction of all opium in the port of Canton. The British Navy retaliated, triggering the First Opium War. The British defeated China and signed several unequal treaties, allowing them to take over Hong Kong. These events had global implications and were important steps in the later expansion of the British Empire.

There is no primary research. On the Indian presence in Canton, so little has been written. Historians have tended to write the military history of the war but the Opium War was very much an Indian war — finances, transport vessels, Indian Parsis, Bohras.

— Writer Amitav Ghosh on researching the historical background to the series.

Ghosh particularly focuses on the role of India in the trade and subsequent conflict, an area that had attracted little prior popular or academic attention. At the time, India was governed by the British East India Company. He was initially inspired by the lives of Indian indentured workers who emigrated from the Bihar region, but found numerous links to the opium trade through researching this. He said in 2008 that he was inspired to begin The Sea of Poppies as a response to what he viewed as the "historical amnesia about war and empire" of the 2003 invasion of Iraq. Beginning in 2004, he travelled to libraries across China, Hong Kong and Singapore to research the setting and utilised his academic training as a social anthropologist for a historiographical approach to fiction writing. It took Ghosh 10 years to complete the series and he conducted enough research during the writing process to publish several academic texts on Indian Ocean naval history.

== Themes and style ==
=== Colonialism and globalisation ===
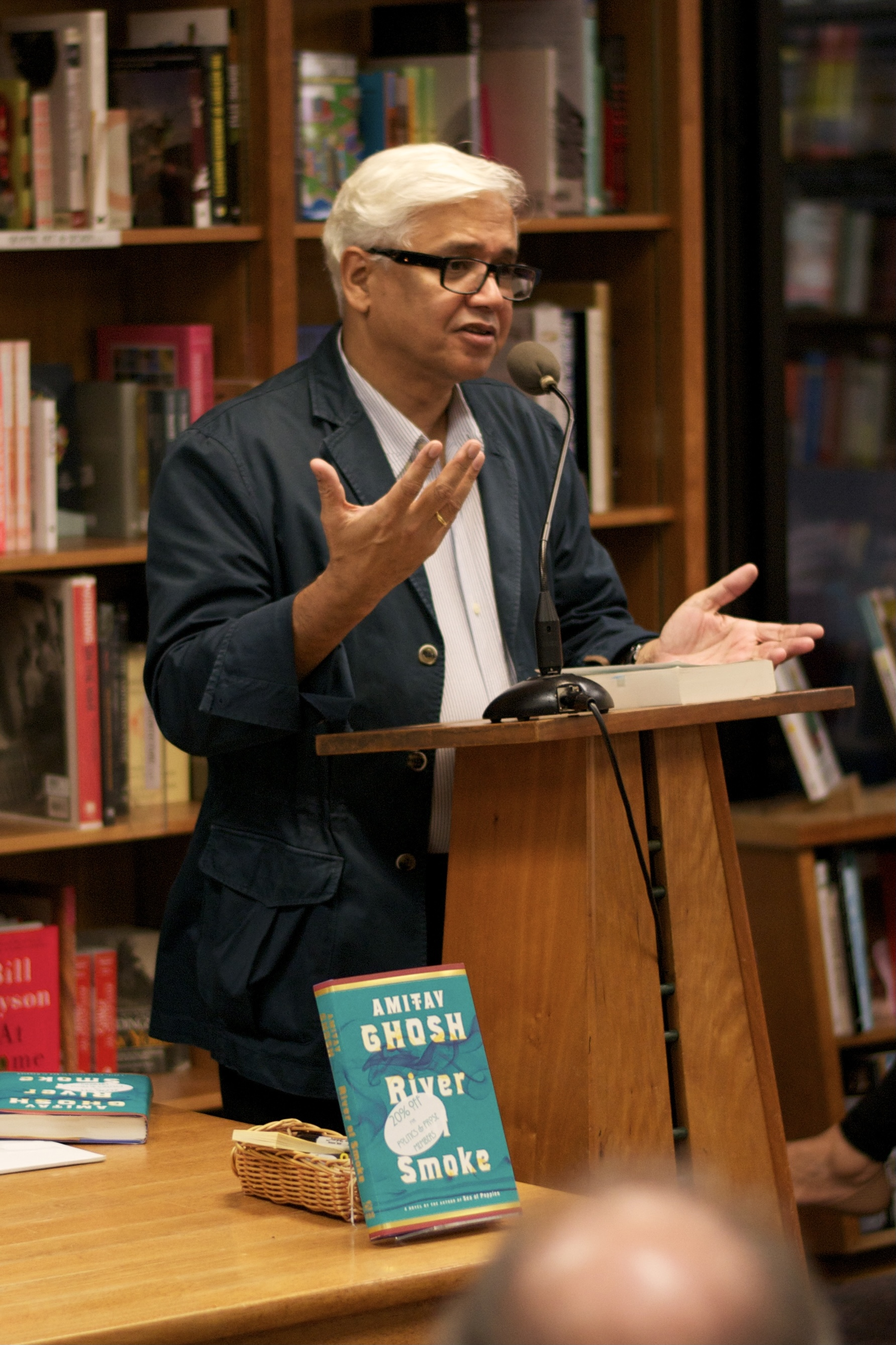
Ghosh promoting River of Smoke in 2011

The series has been described as a work of postcolonial literature and been proposed as blurring the line between historical fact and fiction. Ghosh uses the trade of opium as a narrative device to explore the history and legacy of the colonial era and describe people's everyday experiences of the British Empire. He also raises ethical questions regarding the trade of opium, such as the role of forced labour, and suggests opium was essential to the economic survival of the British Empire. Ghosh also uses the opium trade to discuss it as an early form of globalisation and commercialisation.

The series' themes stem from the asymmetrical relations that arose through the opium wars, including abundance and poverty, intimacy and exclusion, chance and fate, and authority. With a narrative that spans the Indian Ocean region, the trilogy has been suggested as proposing the region an alternative space for discussing colonial history, as a region with extensive international trade. Ghosh also uses the series to explore the unequal interpretation of history by focusing on subaltern people and perspectives.

=== Water ===
Ghosh has described water as a key theme of the series. He said in 2015: "I’m from West Bengal. Water, rivers etc., are an important aspect of life there, even in Bengali art and cinema. Personally, water is an essential part of my imaginative landscape."

=== Language ===
Ghosh manipulates and uses different languages in the series to touch on themes of diaspora, globalisation, hybrid languages and ineffability. He supplements his prose in the series with at least 23 languages other than English, and has described this multilingual mix as "zubben". Sea of Poppies includes a "Chrestomathy" which describes the meanings and origins of several words that appear throughout.

=== Ecology and environment ===
The series has also been described as having an eco-critical narrative, touching on the transformation and use of natural resources for economic means, as well as climate change.

== Reception ==
The trilogy was for the most part well received. In Los Angeles Review of Books, Anjali Vaidya praised the series, saying "Against this exquisitely researched historical backdrop, the tale of Britain’s victory and China’s loss reaches the levels of Greek tragedy in Ghosh’s skilled hands — there are few storytellers alive today in the English language as gifted as Amitav Ghosh." She said that Flood of Fire was the strongest entry, whereas the other two could sometimes be "weighed down at times by the research that went into them".

Alex Clark in The Guardian reviewed the trilogy positively, saying "[Ghosh] marshals the language of tiny details, from naval and military terminology to food and clothes and interiors, from boudoir to battlefield, in order to bolster our sense of how enormous and wide-ranging were the effects of this period of history, and of the unforgiving, brutalising opium trade in particular, how greatly it shaped international relations, communities and patterns of migration." In South China Morning Post, James Kidd gave Flood of Fire five out of five stars, saying "few writers have combined popular and literary styles in a Hong Kong-set book better than Amitav Ghosh", and commended the series for its narrative, humour and exploration of realpolitik.

In The American Historical Review, Mark Frost discussed Ghosh's credentials as a historian in the trilogy. He suggests "one weakness of Ghosh’s first installment in the Ibis Trilogy is his failure to read Victorian primary sources with a sufficiently critical eye," but that he "remains a historiographical torchbearer who over much of his career has explored the past connections and convergences of the Indian Ocean world well ahead of the academic curve."

=== Awards ===
Title	Year	Award	Result	Ref
Sea of Poppies	2008	Man Booker Prize	Shortlisted	
River of Smoke	2013	DSC Prize for South Asian Literature	Shortlisted	
River of Smoke	2011	Man Asian Literary Prize	Shortlisted	
River of Smoke	2011	The Hindu Literary Prize	Shortlisted	
Flood of Fire	2016	Crossword Book Award for English Fiction	Won	
Flood of Fire	2015	The Hindu Literary Prize	Shortlisted	

== Future and adaptations ==
Although he said the trilogy was completed, Ghosh suggested in 2015 that "at some point, I may return to these characters. I don’t feel I have parted from the characters yet." In March 2019, it was announced that a television series based on the books would be directed by Shekhar Kapur and produced by Artists Studio, part of Endemol Shine Group. Michael Hirst was announced as the writer of the series. In 2023, Ghosh published Smoke and Ashes, a non-fiction book about the history of the opium trade, based on the research he had compiled whilst writing the trilogy.

== See also ==
- Canton System
- Tai-Pan
- The Opium Clerk
