= The Earthspinner =

Novel by Anuradha Roy

- First Edition Cover by Monica Reyes Alvarez
- Author: Anuradha Roy
- Cover artist: Monica Reyes alvarez
- Language: English
- Genre: Fiction
- Publisher: Hachette India
- Publication place: India
- Pages: 232

The Earthspinner is an Indian fictional novel written by Anuradha Roy. It is published by Hachette India.

== Reception ==
The Guardian wrote in a review "Anuradha Roy’s carefully crafted fifth novel shows how, in such a place, things can change in extraordinary ways, even if new beginnings and worlds are hard to come by."

The Times of India wrote in a review "All in all, the novel "shows the many ways in which the East encounters the West, fanaticism wars tirelessly against reason, and the individual's creative desires struggle against a populace's basic instinct for destruction."

The Hindu wrote in a review "The third thing about The Earthspinner is its powerful description of the process of artistic creation."

The Indian Express wrote in a review "In the book, titled “The Earthspinner”, Roy delves into the “life and mind of Elango the potter, who must navigate complicated and impossible love, the dedication of a beloved pet, his own passion for creativity and a world turned upside down by the petty violence that characterises the present day."
