= Sleeping on Jupiter =

2015 novel by Anuradha Roy

- First edition cover
- Author: Anuradha Roy
- Cover artist: Monica Reyes Alvarez
- Language: English
- Set in: Jarmuli, India
- Publisher: Hachette India
- Publication date: 15 April 2015
- Publication place: Gurgaon
- Media type: Print (hardback and softback), e-book, audio
- Pages: 256
- Awards: 2016 DSC Prize for South Asian Literature
- ISBN: 978-93-5009-936-0 (hardback)
- OCLC: 919002742

Sleeping on Jupiter is a novel by Anuradha Roy. It is her third novel and was published by Hachette India on 15 April 2015. It was longlisted for the 2015 Man Booker Prize and shortlisted for the 2015 The Hindu Literary Prize. It won the 2016 DSC Prize for South Asian Literature.

== Summary ==
Nomi Frederiksen travels to Jarmuli, a temple town in India's coastal northeast, to produce a documentary film. Nomi was born in India but was later orphaned, and sent to an ashram in Jarmuli. She was subjected to physical, emotional, and sexual abuse while at the ashram. She later escaped and was adopted, moving to Norway. She meets three old women while on a train, Gouri, Latika, and Vidya. Her production assistant, Suraj, is Vidya's son and is troubled by his ongoing divorce. The chapters alternate between Nomi's first-person narration and third person narratives following the novel's secondary characters.

== Reception ==
Kirkus Reviews praised the first-person narration of Nomi but criticized the secondary characters for doing "nothing to move the story forward" and wrote that the novel lacked a "satisfying resolution".

Publishers Weekly wrote that "the overlapping stories make for a rich and absorbing consideration of where the past ends and the present begins".

== Awards and honours ==
- Shortlist, 2015 The Hindu Literary Prize
- Longlist, 2015 Man Booker Prize
- Winner, 2016 DSC Prize for South Asian Literature
- Shortlist, 2015 Tata Literature Live! Book of the Year Award for Fiction
- Shortlist, 2015 Atta Galatta–Bangalore Literature Festival Fiction Prize
