= Permanent Black =

Indian publisher

- Status: Active
- Founded: 2000
- Founder: Rukun Advani, Anuradha Roy
- Country of origin: India
- Headquarters location: Ranikhet, India
- Distribution: Orient Blackswan
- Nonfiction topics: Academic publishing
- Official website: permanent-black.blogspot.com

Permanent Black is an independent publishing press headquartered in Ranikhet, India. It was founded in 2000 by novelist Anuradha Roy, and her husband, editor Rukun Advani. It is considered one of India's major academic imprints and has tied up with the Ashoka University to publish a scholarly series titled "Hedgehog and Fox" edited by the historian Rudrangshu Mukherjee. It has published books by noted scholars, including Sanjay Subrahmanyam, Muzaffar Alam, Romila Thapar, Tanika Sarkar, Sudipta Kaviraj, Sheldon Pollock, Niraja Gopal Jayal, Nivedita Menon, Ramachandra Guha, Arvind Krishna Mehrotra, Mukul Sharma, Kaushik Basu and Partha Chatterjee. Their books are distributed by the Indian publishing house Orient Blackswan. It has in the past partnered with various foreign university presses, such as University of California Press, Harvard University Press, Princeton University Press, University of Chicago Press, University of Washington Press, and State University of New York Press to co-publish their titles in Europe and the USA.
