= Neelum Saran Gour =

Indian novelist

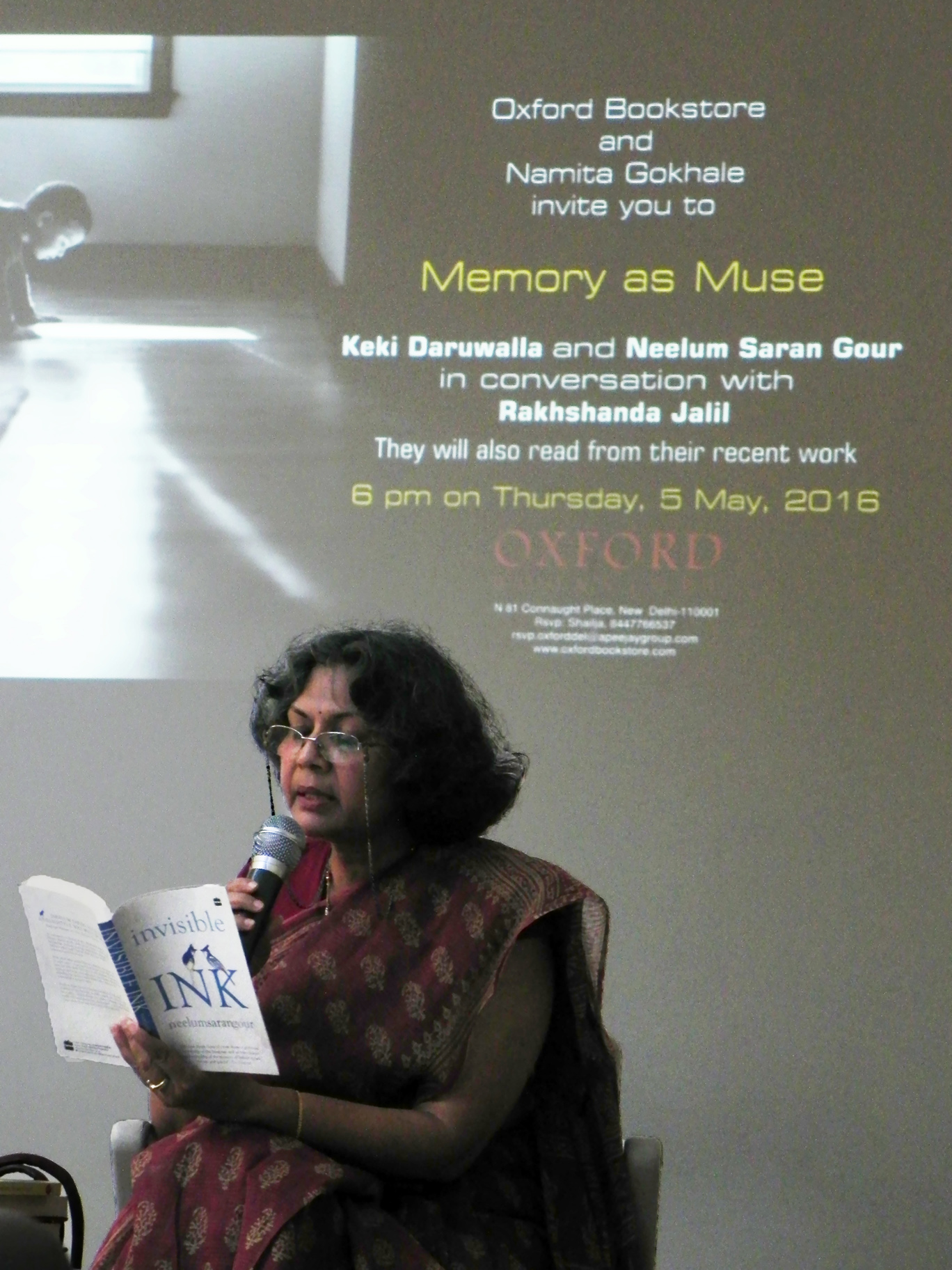
- Neelum Saran Gour reading at the literary event, Memory as Muse,Oxford Bookstore, New Delhi
- Born: 12 October 1955 (age 70); Allahabad, India
- Education: Allahabad University
- Occupations: Writer and academic
- Writing career
- Language: English, Hindi
- Genre: Fiction
- Website: www.neelumsarangour.com

Neelum Saran Gour (born 12 October 1955) is an Indian English writer of fiction that depicts North India's small towns and their cultural histories. She is the author of six novels, four collections of short stories and one work of literary non-fiction. She has edited a pictorial volume on the history and culture of the city of Allahabad, where she lives and works, and has also translated one of her early novels into Hindi.

== Early life and education ==
Born in Allahabad, Neelum Saran Gour is the child of a Bengali mother and a Hindiphone father and was exposed to an array of languages and cultural influences in her childhood. Educated in St. Mary's Convent Inter College, a school run by Roman Catholic nuns, she went on to study History, Philosophy and English Literature at the University of Allahabad in the early nineteen seventies. In 1977, she was appointed Lecturer in English in the Department of English at the Allahabad University and now holds the position of Professor in her subject, English Literature.

== Career ==
Neelum Saran Gour's first writings were magazine stories published in Indian literary magazines. Managing Director of Penguin India, David Davidar the solicited her for a volume of short stories. Her debut collection Grey Pigeon and Other Stories was released by Penguin India in 1993. She then won a Writers' Fellowship in Britain from the Charles Wallace India Trust. Her next book, a novel, was titled Speaking of '62 and was published by Penguin in 1995. This was followed in 1997 by Winter Companions And Other Stories.

In 2002 appeared Virtual Realities and in 2005 two novels were published, Sikandar Chowk Park by Penguin, and Messres Dickens, Doyle and Wodehouse Pvt. Ltd. by Halcyon Books. Her work was covered by Routledge Encyclopedia of Post-colonial Literatures, edited by Eugene Benson and L.W. Conolly, The Cambridge Encyclopaedia of Women’s Writing, edited by Lorna Sage, Germaine Greer and Elaine Showalter, Companion to Indian Fiction In English, edited by Pier Paolo Piciucco, and Indian English Literature 1980 -2000 by M.K.Naik and Shyamala Narayan. Recent critical writings on her work are included in Emerging South Asian Writers, Edited by Feroza Jussawalla and Deborah Fillerup Weagel and in Contemporary Fiction: An Anthology of Female Writers, edited by Vandana Pathak, Urmila Dabir and Shubha Mishra.

In 2009, she published the pictorial volume Allahabad Where The Rivers Meet, edited by Gour and published by Marg Publications. In 2010, Penguin–Yatra published a Hindi translation of Gour's early novel Speaking of 62, titled 62 Ki Baatein. 2011 saw the launch of Song Without End And Other Stories by Penguin. A work of non-fiction followed in 2015, about the literary history of the Allahabad University, Three Rivers And A Tree – The Story Of Allahabad University, published by Rupa Publications. This was followed, in the same year, by Allahabad Aria, also published by Rupa Publications and Invisible Ink, published in late 2015 by HarperCollins. Her latest novel is Requiem In Raga Janki, published in June 2018 by Penguin Viking.

Apart from these exclusively authored works, her work has appeared in numerous fiction and non-fiction anthologies like: Desert in Bloom- Contemporary Indian Women's Fiction In English, edited by Meenakshi Bharat,( Pencraft International, 2004), Growing Up As A Woman Writer, edited by Jasbir Jain (Sahitya Akademi and Sage Publications 2007), The Fear Factor, Edited by Sharon Rundle and Meenakshi Bharat (Picador, 2009), Only Connect, edited by Sharon Rundle and Meenakshi Bharat (Brass Monkey, Australia and Rupa Publications, India, 2014)), Indian English And Vernacular India, edited by Makarand Paranjape and G.J.V.Prasad (Pearson 2010), The Creative Process- Seven Essays,(The Institute for Research in Interdisciplinary Studies, 2013) and Learning Non-violence, edited by Gangeya Mukherji (Oxford University Press, 2016).

Gour's critical writings include Raja Rao's Metaphysical Trilogy,( Kitab Mahal, 1992) as also her book reviews for The Indian Review Of Books and for the Times Literary Supplement. As a journalist she was a humour columnist for the Allahabad page of The Hindustan Times. She has conducted Creative Writing workshops for the Sahitya Akademi and the Central University of Rajasthan, researched and worked on the BBC One series Who Do You Think You Are? in which Rupert Penry-Jones searched for his family history, aired internationally on 16 August 2010. Her novel Sikandar Chowk Park was prescribed for study in the M.A. course of the Charles University Prague. Her story A Lane In Lucknow is prescribed for study in the M.A. course of the U.G.C.’s e- Pathshala project.

== Awards ==
- 2018 The Hindu Prize for Fiction for Requiem In Raga Janki. The prize was announced by N. Ravi, Publisher and former Editor-in-Chief of The Hindu at the Hindu Lit For Life festival held in Chennai, 12–14 January 2019.
- Sahitya Akademi Award 2023 for her novel Requiem in Raga Janki.

== Works ==
- Gour, Neelum Saran (25 February 1988). "Grey Pigeon" and Other Stories. New Delhi, India; New York, N.Y.: Penguin Books Ltd. ISBN 9780140107937.
- Gour, Neelam Saran (28 September 1995). Speaking of '62. New Delhi; New York, N.Y., USA: Penguin Books Australia. ISBN 9780140245943.
- Gour, Neelum Saran (1 February 1997). Winter Companions and Other Stories (2 ed.). New Delhi; New York, NY: Penguin Books India. ISBN 9780140249897.
- Gour, Neelum Saran (1 July 2015). Three Rivers and a Tree. Rupa Publications India. ASIN B016APQK4I.
- Gour, Neelum Saran (10 December 2001). Virtual Realities. New Delhi, India; London: Penguin India. ISBN 9780143028062.
- Gour, Neelum Saran, ed. (1 September 2009). Allahabad: Where the Rivers Meet. The Marg Foundation. ISBN 9788185026947.
