= Hansda Sowvendra Shekhar =

Indian writer (born 1983)

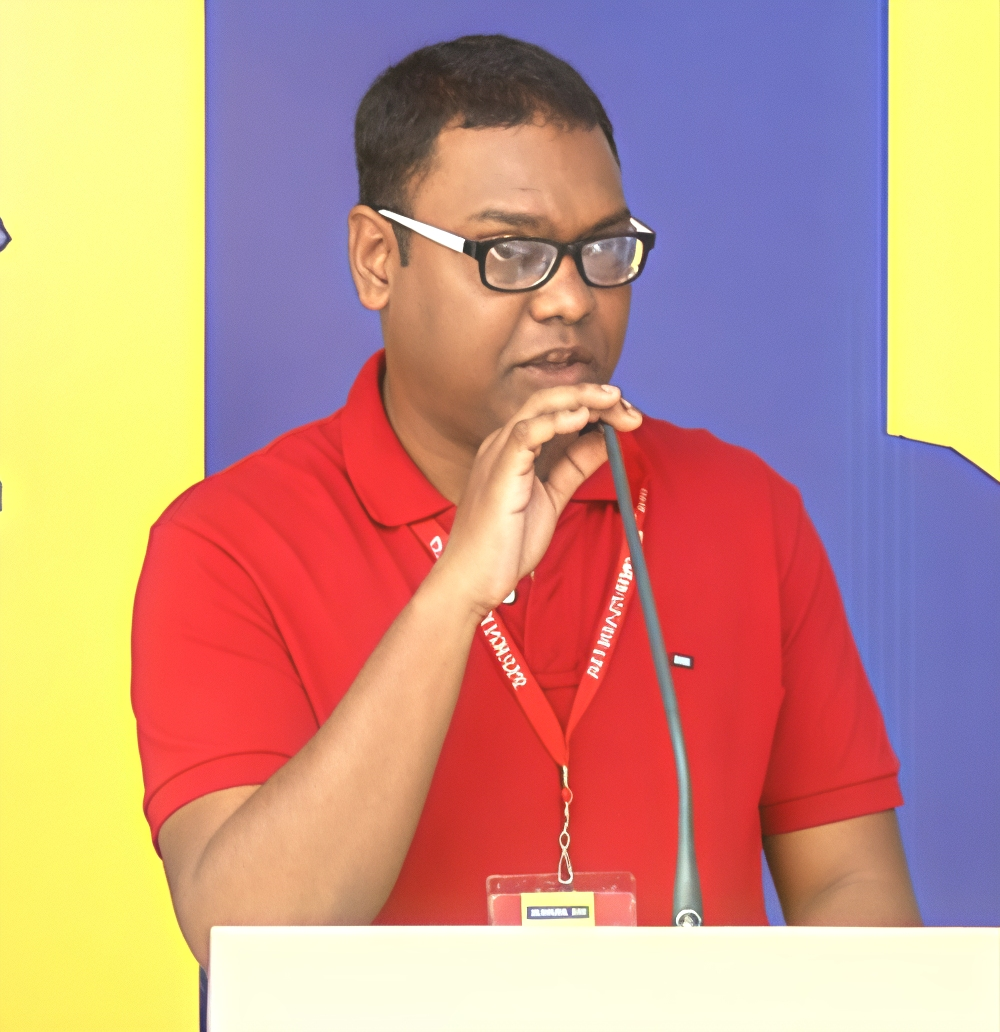
- Hansda Sowvendra Shekhar at The Hindu Lit for Life in Chennai in January 2015
- Born: 1983 (age 42–43); Ranchi, Jharkhand, India
- Occupation: Writer
- Writing career
- Language: English; Hindi
- Genres: Fiction; literary fiction; Tribal literature
- Notable works: •The Mysterious Ailment of Rupi Baskey •The Adivasi Will Not Dance: Stories •My Father's Garden
- Notable awards: Sahitya Akademi Yuva Puraskar (2015)

Hansda Sowvendra Shekhar (born 1983) is an Indian writer from Santhal tribe in Jharkhand, best known for his literary works that explore the lives, experiences, and struggles of indigenous communities in India, particularly focusing on tribal cultures. His debut novel, The Mysterious Ailment of Rupi Baskey (2014), received widespread critical acclaim for its portrayal of tribal life and social issues. Shekhar's work contributes to the broader discourse on the representation of indigenous voices in Indian literature.

== Life ==
Ethnically, Shekhar is a Santhal, one of India's Adivasi groups; this background is reflected in his fiction. His stories are rich in "fine details that add to the deep dimensions" and "open to us a world we have deliberately dismissed" and contain "a surplus of understanding that comes from a kind insider-outsider." Indeed, he characterised his first novel as "the first full-fledged Santhal novel written in English, and published by a mainstream publisher." Born in Ranchi, Shekhar grew up in Ghatshila and Chakulia and went to school in Musabani. His parents used to work with Hindustan Copper in Ghatshila. By profession, he is a medical doctor employed as a medical officer with the government of Jharkhand, and has worked in Pakur and Chandil.

Though Shekhar writes primarily in English, he also translates from Santhali to English, Hindi to English, Bengali to English, and English to Hindi.

== Works ==
- The Mysterious Ailment of Rupi Baskey (New Delhi: Aleph Book Company, 2014) ISBN 9789382277323
- The Adivasi Will Not Dance: Stories (New Delhi: Speaking Tiger Books, 2015) ISBN 9789385288647
- Jwala Kumar and the Gift of Fire: Adventures in Champakbagh (featuring illustrations by Krishna Bala Shenoi) (New Delhi: Talking Cub - an imprint of Speaking Tiger - 2018) ISBN 9789387693975 In the year 2021, this book was reissued with a new title, Jwala Kumar and the Gift of Fire: The Dragon who came to Champakbagh. ISBN 9789354470264
- My Father's Garden (New Delhi: Speaking Tiger, 2018) ISBN 9789388326223
- Who's There? (featuring illustrations by Anupama Ajinkya Apte) (Chennai: Duckbill Books - an imprint of Penguin Random House India - 2020) ISBN 9780143450788
- Sumi Budhi and Sugi (featuring illustrations by Joanna Mendes) (also translated the book into Hindi as Sumi Budhi aur Sugi) (Bengaluru: Pratham Books, 2020)
- (as translator, Hindi to English) I Named My Sister Silence (novel, original title: Kaale Adhyaay) by Manoj Rupda (Chennai: Eka, an imprint of Westland Books, 2023) ISBN 9789357765770
- The Weavers and the Elephant (featuring illustrations by Proiti Roy) (Chennai: Red Panda, an imprint of Westland Books, 2025) ISBN 9789371979405
- (as translator, Bengali to English) Gold Sand, Gold Water (novel, original title: Subarnarenu Subarnarekha) by Nalini Bera (London: Seagull Books, 2026) ISBN 9781803095912
- Mother Works on a Hill (featuring illustrations by Mohith O) ISBN 9789361303531 (also translated the book into Hindi as Pahaad Par Kaam Karti Aayo ISBN 9789361307676) (Bengaluru: Pratham Books, 2026)
- (as translator, English to Hindi) Baasanti Swaad Ke Hamaare Chaawal (picture book, original title: Our Rice Tastes of Spring) by Anumeha Yadav (text) and Spitting Image (illustrations) (Bhopal: Eklavya, 2026) ISBN 9789376129003

== Awards and recognition ==
For his debut novel, The Mysterious Ailment of Rupi Baskey, Shekhar won the 2015 Yuva Puraskar, was shortlisted for the 2014 Hindu Literary Prize and a 2014 Crossword Book Award in the Fiction category, longlisted for the 2016 International Dublin Literary Award, and jointly won the 2015 Muse India Young Writer Award. The Mysterious Ailment of Rupi Baskey was named by The Hindu in December 2019 as one of the ten best fiction books of the decade.

For his second book, The Adivasi Will Not Dance: Stories, Shekhar was shortlisted for the 2016 Hindu Literary Prize. The Adivasi Will Not Dance: Stories was included by Frontline in August 2022 in a list of 25 books “that light up the path to understanding post-Independence Indian literature.”

Jwala Kumar and the Gift of Fire: Adventures in Champakbagh is Shekhar's first book for children. This book features illustrations by Krishna Bala Shenoi. It was shortlisted for a 2019 Neev Book Award in the category Junior Readers and a 2019 Crossword Book Award in the children's books category.

His fourth book, a novel entitled My Father's Garden, has been called "rich and surprising" and "[packing] more emotion, detail and narrative heft than...books four times its size." My Father's Garden was shortlisted for the JCB Prize for Literature 2019.

I Named My Sister Silence was shortlisted for the JCB Prize for Literature 2023. The jury commented: “A novel of epic stature told with great beauty and brevity, it's [sic] power is felt viscerally in Hansda Sowvendra’s Shekhar’s translation. The writing offers rich imagery that does the storytelling using soundscapes and landscapes with equal felicity. Manoj Rupda plays on the theme that everything grand is eventually destroyed, be it a majestic elephant, a ship, or an entire tribal civilization eaten away by a corrupt society. The complex and emotionally wrenching relationship between the protagonist and his sister is at the heart of it, making this perhaps the most layered among many novels about sibling relationships.” I Named My Sister Silence was also shortlisted for a 2023 Atta Galatta Bangalore Literature Festival Book Prize in the Fiction category and has been shortlisted for a 2024 Crossword Book Award in the Translation category.

Shekhar was one of the two writers from India who spent a month-long residency during October-November 2025 at Varuna, the National Writers’ House in Katoomba, Australia under the Varuna-Sangam House 2025/26 First Peoples India-Australia Exchange programme.

== Controversy ==
On 11 August 2017, the government of Jharkhand banned The Adivasi Will Not Dance: Stories and summarily suspended Shekhar from his job, on the grounds that the book portrayed Adivasi women and Santhal culture in a bad light. The key complainants appear to have been the ruling party in Jharkhand, the Bharatiya Janata Party; the opposition party, Jharkhand Mukti Morcha; and an academic at Jamia Millia Islamia. The government's actions were widely criticised. The ban on The Adivasi Will Not Dance: Stories was removed in December 2017 and Shekhar's suspension was removed and he was reinstated into his job in 2018.
