= The Adivasi Will Not Dance: Stories =

Collection of short stories by Hansda Sowvendra Shekhar

- Author: Hansda Sowvendra Shekhar
- Language: English
- Genre: Fiction, Short stories
- Publisher: Speaking Tiger Books, New Delhi, India
- Publication date: 2015
- Publication place: India
- Media type: Print (hardcover, paperback), E-book
- ISBN: 9789385288647
- Preceded by: The Mysterious Ailment of Rupi Baskey (2014)
- Followed by: Jwala Kumar and the Gift of Fire: Adventures in Champakbagh (2018)

The Adivasi Will Not Dance: Stories is a collection of short stories by Hansda Sowvendra Shekhar. It is his second book and was nominated for The Hindu Literary Prize in 2016 and included by Frontline (magazine) in August 2022 in a list of 25 books “that light up the path to understanding post-Independence Indian literature.” As of April 2021, this book has been translated into Hindi, Marathi, Tamil, Gujarati, and Bengali, while the Malayalam and Austrian German translations are forthcoming.

== Summary ==
The characters and settings of the stories are mostly from the community of Santhal people in the Indian state of Jharkhand, particularly about Coal mining in India. Prominent themes include the condition of women in a patriarchal society, poverty, middle-class Santhal life, the situation of Adivasi people, organised crime, tensions between traditionalism and modernity, the social damage caused by mining and sex-work.

Title	Theme	First published	pp.
They eat meat!	Prejudice among Hindu people in Gujarat, and the 2002 Gujarat riots.	La.Lit	1-27
Sons	The contrast between a spoiled child and one from a poor background.	'Scions ', Northeast Review, 3 (March–April 2013)	28-38
November is the month of migrations	A Santhal migrant worker doing sex-work.		39-42
Getting even	Human trafficking of low-caste Hindu people.		43-57
Eating with the enemy	The complex life of a domestic servant, Sulochona.	The Four Quarters Magazine	58-89
Blue baby	A woman's ill-conceived plan to escape an arranged marriage by getting pregnant beforehand.	The Statesman	90-111
Baso-jhi	An old widow being identified as a dahni (witch).	Indian Literature (2007)	112-29
Desire, divination, death	A woman losing her son to fever.	Indian Literature	130-43
Merely a whore	A sex-worker falls in love with one of her clients and hopes for rescue from her profession.	The Four Quarters Magazine	144-68
The Adivasi will not dance	An Adivasi dance-troupe is commissioned to celebrate the building of a power-plant, but instead protest against it.	The Dhauli Review	169-87

== Reviews and studies ==
- Priyanka Tripathi,“The Adivasi Will Not Dance: Stories by Hansda Sowvendra Shekhar.” Rupkatha Journal on Interdisciplinary Studies in Humanities, Vol. IX, No. 4, 2017, pp. 193–196. DOI: https://dx.doi.org/10.21659/rupkatha.v9n4.r02
- Devapriya Roy, 'An unusual five: The reader’s guide to the Hindu Prize shortlist', Scroll.in ([no date])
- Namrata Chaturvedi, 'Combating bias', Deccan Herald (1 November 2015)
- Jean Spraker, 'Review: The Adivasi Will Not Dance by Hansda Sowvendra Shekhar' (27 October 2016)
- Nilanjana S. Roy, 'Short!', Business Standard (4 January 2016)
- Sudipta Datta, 'The Adivasi Will Not Dance: Dark places', Financial Express (27 December 2015)
- Amrita Dutta, 'Book Review: The Writer as Political Being', The Indian Express (19 December 2015)
- Radhika S., 'Review: Hansda Shekhar’s The Adivasi Will Not Dance is a no-holds-barred account of life on the margins', The Hindu (12 November 2016)

The work has also attracted dedicated scholarly commentary:

- Arya, A., 'Dismantling the Hegemonic Structure through the War of Manoeuvre: Hansda Sowvendra Shekhar’s The Adivasi Will Not Dance as a Dogma of Adivasis', The Creative Launcher: An International, Open Access, Peer-Reviewed, Refereed, E-Journal in English, 2.3 (August 2017), 193–200.
- Abin Chakraborty, 'Examining Subalterneity in Hansda Sowvendra Sekhar’s “The Adivasi Will Not Dance” ', Postcolonial Text 12.1 (2017), 1–15.

== Controversy ==
On 11 August 2017, the government of Jharkhand banned The Adivasi Will Not Dance: Stories and summarily suspended the author from his job, on the grounds that the book portrayed Adivasi women and Santhal culture in a bad light. The key complainants appear to have been the ruling party in Jharkhand, the Bharatiya Janata Party, the opposition party Jharkhand Mukti Morcha, and an academic at Jamia Millia Islamia. The government's actions were widely criticised. The ban on The Adivasi Will Not Dance: Stories was removed in December 2017 and Shekhar's suspension was removed and he was reinstated into his job in 2018.
