= Daisy Hasan =

Indian-English author

Daisy Hasan (Assamese: ডেইজী হাচান) is an Indian-English author from Shillong, Meghalaya and is the author of The To-Let House. It was longlisted for the Man Asian Literary Prize 2008.

== Biography ==
Daisy Hasan teaches at the University of Cardiff, Wales. She is a writer and filmmaker, interested in theatre and video films. She writes regularly for national newspapers, acts in street theatre and is currently teaching a course on Bollywood films. She holds a PhD from Swansea University, UK. She is currently engaged in a study of South Asian women's art in conflict situations at the University of Leeds, UK and is working on her second novel to be set in Britain.

Her book The To-Let House was shortlisted for The Hindu Best Fiction Award in 2010.

She took part in the Bush Theatre's 2011 project Sixty Six Books where she wrote a piece based upon a book of the King James Bible.
