= Racists (novel) =

2006 novel by Kunal Basu

- First edition
- Author: Kunal Basu
- Language: English
- Publisher: Weidenfeld & Nicolson
- Publication date: January 2006 (1st edition)
- Publication place: United Kingdom
- ISBN: 978-0-297-85066-3

Racists is a 2006 novel by Kunal Basu about a scientific experiment in the mid-19th century in which a white girl and a black boy are raised together as savages on a small uninhabited island off the coast of Africa. The long-term experiment is devised by the "racists" of the title, two rival scientists—one British, one French—to once and for all settle the question of racial superiority.

== Plot ==
Two scientists decide to settle the question of racial superiority by leaving two children—a white girl and black boy—alone on an island to be raised without speaking by only a nurse, Norah. The British scientist Samuel Bates believes that the girl will emerge as the leader, while the French scientist Jean-Louis Belavoix believes that the two races can not live in peace and the children will ultimately murder each other. The experiment begins to run into problems when Bates and Belavoix argue about the validity of cranial measurements. Meanwhile, Bates's long suffering assistant Nicholas Quartley falls in love with Norah and decides to rescue her from the island.

== See also ==
- Feral children
- Scientific racism
- Craniometry (the method used by the English scientist, a craniologist, to prove the white girl's superiority)

== Reviews ==
- Mike Phillips (The Guardian)
- Rashmee Roshan Lall (The Times of India)
- Maya Khankhoje
- Pranoti Chirmuley
