= Santanu Das =

Indian academic and author

Academic background
- Education: Calcutta University, Cambridge University
- Thesis: The sense of touch in First World War literature

Academic work
- Discipline: Literature
- Institutions: All Souls College

Santanu Das is an Indian-born academic and author, best known for his work on the literature of the First World War. Since 2019, he has been Professor of Modern Literature and Culture at Oxford University and a Senior Fellow at All Souls College, Oxford.

== Education ==
Das was educated at Calcutta University and St John's College, Cambridge. In 2003 he completed a PhD entitled 'The sense of touch in First World War literature'.

== Career ==
Das was a member of the academic staff of Queen Mary University of London (2008–11) and St John's College, Cambridge. and a lecturer at King's College London (2012–18).

His 2005 monograph Touch and Intimacy in First World War Literature received the Choice Outstanding Academic Book Award in 2007. His 2018 book India, Empire and First World War Culture: Writings, Images, and Songs won the Hindu Non-Fiction Prize, and the Anand Kentish Coomaraswamy Book Prize, awarded by the Association of Asian Studies.

In 2013 Das received a British Academy mid-career fellowship. Das is a member of the International Network for the Study of the Great War in Africa, and the leader of a million-Euro project on the "Cultural exchange in a time of global conflict: Colonials, Neutrals and Belligerents during the First World War (CEGC)", financed by the Humanities in European Research Area (HERA).

Das has written for The Independent and The Guardian.

== Works ==
- Touch and Intimacy in First World War Literature (Cambridge, 2006; winner of a Philip Leverhulme Prize)
- India, Empire and First World War Culture: Writings, Images and Songs (Cambridge: Cambridge University Press, 2018)

== Awards ==
- 2019 The Hindu Literary Prize for India, Empire and First World War Culture: Writings, Images and Songs
