= Anjum Hasan =

Indian writer

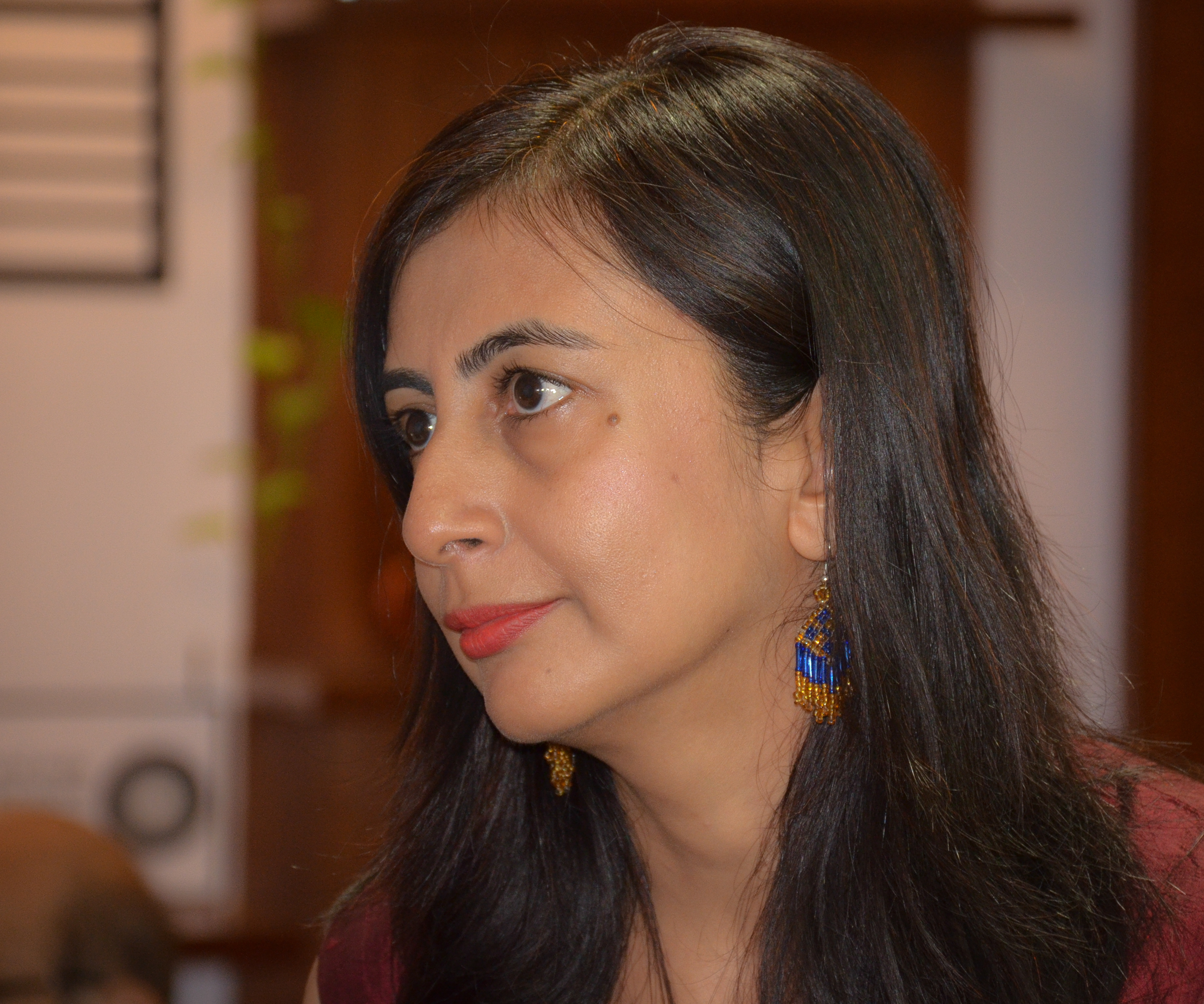
- Born: 1972 (age 53–54); Shillong, Meghalaya, India
- Education: North-Eastern Hill University
- Occupation: Writer
- Website: www.anjumhasan.com

Anjum Hasan is an Indian novelist, short story writer, poet, and editor.

== Early life ==
Hasan was born in 1972 in Shillong, Meghalaya. She stated in an interview that she had a middle-class upbringing - "insulated, comfortable but not over-privileged". She graduated in philosophy from North-Eastern Hill University in Shillong.

== Career ==
Anjum Hasan's first book was a collection of poems Street on the Hill, published by Sahitya Akademi in 2006.

Her debut novel Lunatic in my Head (Zubaan-Penguin, 2007) was shortlisted for the Crossword Book Award 2007. Set in Shillong in the early 1990s, it weaves together the stories of its three main characters, and has been described by Siddhartha Deb as 'haunting and lyrical'.

Her second novel titled Neti, Neti (Roli Books, 2009) was longlisted for the 2008 Man Asian Literary Prize and shortlisted for The Hindu Best Fiction Award in 2010. It told the story of 25-year old Sophie Das, a dreamy character from Shillong, looking for fulfilment in Bangalore. The novel was described as painting "an empathetic portrait of the unusually liberated—and unexpectedly lost—middle-class youth of the brave new India."

Her short-story collection, Difficult Pleasures (Penguin/Viking 2012), was shortlisted for The Hindu Literary Prize and the Crossword Book Award. Lunatic in my Head, Neti, Neti (as Big Girl Now) and Difficult Pleasures have all appeared in Australia from Brass Monkey Books.

Her third novel The Cosmopolitans was published by Penguin Books India in 2015 and Brio Books Australia in 2016. It was described as “that rare thing: a novel of ideas”

In 2018 she published the short story collection A Day in the Life. It won the Valley of Words award 2019.

In 2022, Hasan's latest novel, History's Angel, was acquired by Bloomsbury India for publication. The novel was awarded the Mumbai Literature Live! Literary Award for fiction book of the year in November, 2024 and the FICCI Book of the Year - Fiction in English, 2024.

== See also ==
- Indian literature
- Indian English Literature
- Literature from North East India
