= Anees Salim =

Indian author

Anees Salim is an Indian author best known for his books Vanity Bagh, The Blind Lady's Descendants and The Small Town Sea. Born in the sea-town of Varkala in south Kerala, he now lives in Kochi where he works as an advertising professional. He won the Sahitya Akademi Award for The Blind Lady's Descendants in 2018, becoming only the fourth Keralite in history to win the award for an English work. Some of his columns have appeared in The Indian Express. Noted for his unadorned, precise prose, Salim is one of the most important figures of twenty-first century Indian English literature.

== Life and career ==
Anees Salim was born in Varkala, a small town in Kerala, in 1970. In an interview to The Hindu, Salim says he inherited his love for words from his father who used to work in West Asia. Salim is the Executive Creative Director for FCB Ulka, the multi-national advertising firm, and lives in Kochi. Despite his background in PR and advertising, Salim makes a point of avoiding promotional tours and speaking at literary festivals.

In an interview to the Earthen Lamp Journal, Salim talks about how his first two novels were rejected by publishers. It was his third book, Tales from a Vending Machine, that helped his career as a writer take off. Sold to a publisher within a week, it renewed interest in his other works and, as Salim says, "fetched me four book deals."

== Awards and honours ==
- 2013 - The Hindu Literary Prize for Vanity Bagh. The prize was announced by novelist Jim Crace in the valedictory function of the Hindu Lit for Life festival held in Chennai during 12–14 January 2014.
- 2015 - Crossword Book Award in Indian Fiction for The Blind Lady’s Descendants
- 2017 - Bangalore Atta Galatta Literature Book Festival's Best Fiction (English) for The Small Town Sea
- 2017 - The Hindu Prize shortlist for the Small Town Sea
- 2017 - Tata Literature Live! Book of the Year Award (Fiction) shortlist for the Small Town Sea
- 2018 - Sahitya Akademi Award (English category), for The Blind Lady's Descendants
- 2022 - JCB Longlist for The Odd Book of Baby Names
- 2022 - Atta Galatta-Bangalore Literature Festival Longlist for The Odd Book of Baby Names
- 2022 - Valley of Words Best Book Award for The Odd Book of Baby Names

== Works ==
- The Vicks Mango Tree (2012) HarperCollins
- Tales From A Vending Machine (2013) HarperCollins
- Vanity Bagh (2013) Picador
- The Blind Lady’s Descendants (2014) Penguin
- The Small-Town Sea (2017) Penguin Hamish Hamilton
- The Odd Book of Baby Names (2021) Penguin Hamish Hamilton
- The Bellboy(2022) Penguin Hamish Hamilton & Holland House
