= The Opium Clerk =

Novel by Kunal Basu

The Opium Clerk is a 2001 novel written by Kunal Basu about the effects of the Eastern opium trade on three generations of an Anglo-Indian “family”. While the novel is nominally about the opium trade it also tells the story of the British trading presence in China and Southeast Asia from the perspective of one of the Indian employees.

== See also ==
- Ibis trilogy
