= The Mysterious Ailment of Rupi Baskey =

2014 novel by Hansda Sowvendra Shekhar

- First edition
- Author: Hansda Sowvendra Shekhar
- Language: English
- Genre: Literary fiction
- Publisher: Aleph Book Company, New Delhi, India
- Publication date: 2014
- Publication place: India
- Media type: Print (paperback), E-book
- ISBN: 9789382277323
- Followed by: The Adivasi Will Not Dance: Stories (2015)

The Mysterious Ailment of Rupi Baskey is a novel by Indian author Hansda Sowvendra Shekhar. Published in the year 2014, this was his first book. For this novel, Shekhar won the 2015 Yuva Puraskar, was shortlisted for the 2014 Crossword Book Award and the 2014 Hindu Literary Prize, longlisted for the 2016 International Dublin Literary Award, and jointly won the 2015 Muse India Young Writer Award. As of December 2019, this book has been translated into Tamil and Bengali. The Mysterious Ailment of Rupi Baskey was named by The Hindu in December 2019 as one of the ten best fiction books of the decade.

== Reception ==
Yatin Gupta, writing for News18, praised the novel as a stunning debut, noting that the first 20 pages were slow to engage him, once immersed in the narrative, he couldn’t put the book down . He commended Shekhar's vivid portrayal of Santhal tribal life and folklore.

Joanna Lobo of DNA, praises the novel’s rich cultural detailing and compelling blend of folklore, gossip, and witchcraft, though she notes that the use of untranslated Santhal language may pose a challenge for some readers.
