= River of Smoke =

2011 novel by Amitav Ghosh

- First edition
- Author: Amitav Ghosh
- Language: English
- Series: Ibis trilogy
- Genre: Novel
- Publisher: Penguin Group
- Publication date: 18 June 2011
- Publication place: India
- Media type: Print (hardback)
- Pages: 557
- ISBN: 978-0-670-08215-5
- Preceded by: Sea of Poppies
- Followed by: Flood of Fire

River of Smoke is a 2011 novel by Indian writer Amitav Ghosh. It is the sequel to Sea of Poppies and is followed by Flood of Fire, which together make up the Ibis trilogy.

== Synopsis ==
The novel begins after the incidents on the Ibis, which was caught in a storm and eventually ended up in Mauritius, but with a few passengers less. From the details of the changing lives and traditions of Indian migrants in Mauritius, the novel traces the fate of other characters from the Ibis and describes the opium trade in China. The novel has a rich tapestry of characters from various cultural and geographical backgrounds whose common interest is trade with China. The plot is set in Fanqui town, a small strip of land used by foreigners to trade with local Chinese traders, a year before the First Opium War.

== Plot introduction ==
In 1838, three ships are caught in a raging storm in the Andaman Sea: the Anahita, owned by Bahram Modi, a Parsi opium trader from Bombay; the Redruth, owned by Fitcher Penrose, on an expedition to collect rare species of plants from China; and the Ibis (from the previous novel Sea of Poppies), carrying convicts and indentured labourers. The convicts Neel Rattan, a Bengali zamindar, and Ah Fatt, a criminal from Canton, escape from the ship along with a couple of lascars.

The story traces the lives of these principal characters in Canton. Bahram Modi, a lowly son-in-law of the rich Parsi shipbuilder Rustamjee Mistrie, has convinced his father-in-law to provide him seed capital to enter into the opium trade, carried out multiple successful expeditions to China, and created considerable wealth in the process for his in-laws. However, on the sudden demise of his father-in-law, he is forced by his brothers-in-law to retire from the export division. Bahram decides to ship a large consignment of opium to China, as he is confident that he would be able to earn a sizeable profit to buy out the export division, in spite of a ban on the trading of opium, issued by the Chinese officials. Bahram has a son (Ah Fatt) through a Chinese boat woman, Chi Mei, unknown to his family back in Bombay.

Fitcher Penrose, a botanist, is on an expedition to China to collect rare plants. He is joined by Paulette Lambert, daughter of a French botanist, in his search for the rare Golden Camellia. They are helped by Robin Chinnery, a fictional illegitimate son of the English painter George Chinnery.

Neel and Ah Fatt have escaped from the Ibis and they meet Bahram Modi, Ah Fatt's father. Neel joins Bahram as his munshi, a personal secretary and translator.

Does Mr. Moddie manage to sell his opium and redeem himself in spite of the Chinese government's crackdown? Does Mr. Penrose find the rare plant he is looking for? Does Neel manage to evade the long arm of the law?

== Characters ==
- Bahram Modi (referred to as "Barry Moddie" by the British) - Parsi merchant from Bombay and father of Ah Fatt
- Chi Mei - A Cantonese Tanka woman who is the lover of Bahram Modi
- Ah Fatt or Framjee (Freddie) Pestonjee Moddie- Son of Bahram Modi and Chi Mei
- Neel Rattan Halder - the Raja of Raskhali and later munshi to Bahram Modi
- Vico - Bahram Modi's purser
- Zadig Bey - an Armenian watch maker and friend of Bahram Modi
- Fitcher Penrose - a Cornish botanist on an expedition to collect rare plants in China
- Paulette Lambert - daughter of a French botanist who accompanies Penrose on his expedition
- Robin Chinnery - artist, Paulette's friend and illegitimate Anglo-Indian son of George Chinnery
- Commissioner Lin Zexu - the incorruptible Chinese mandarin who is appointed by the Emperor of China to put an end to opium trading

== Reception ==
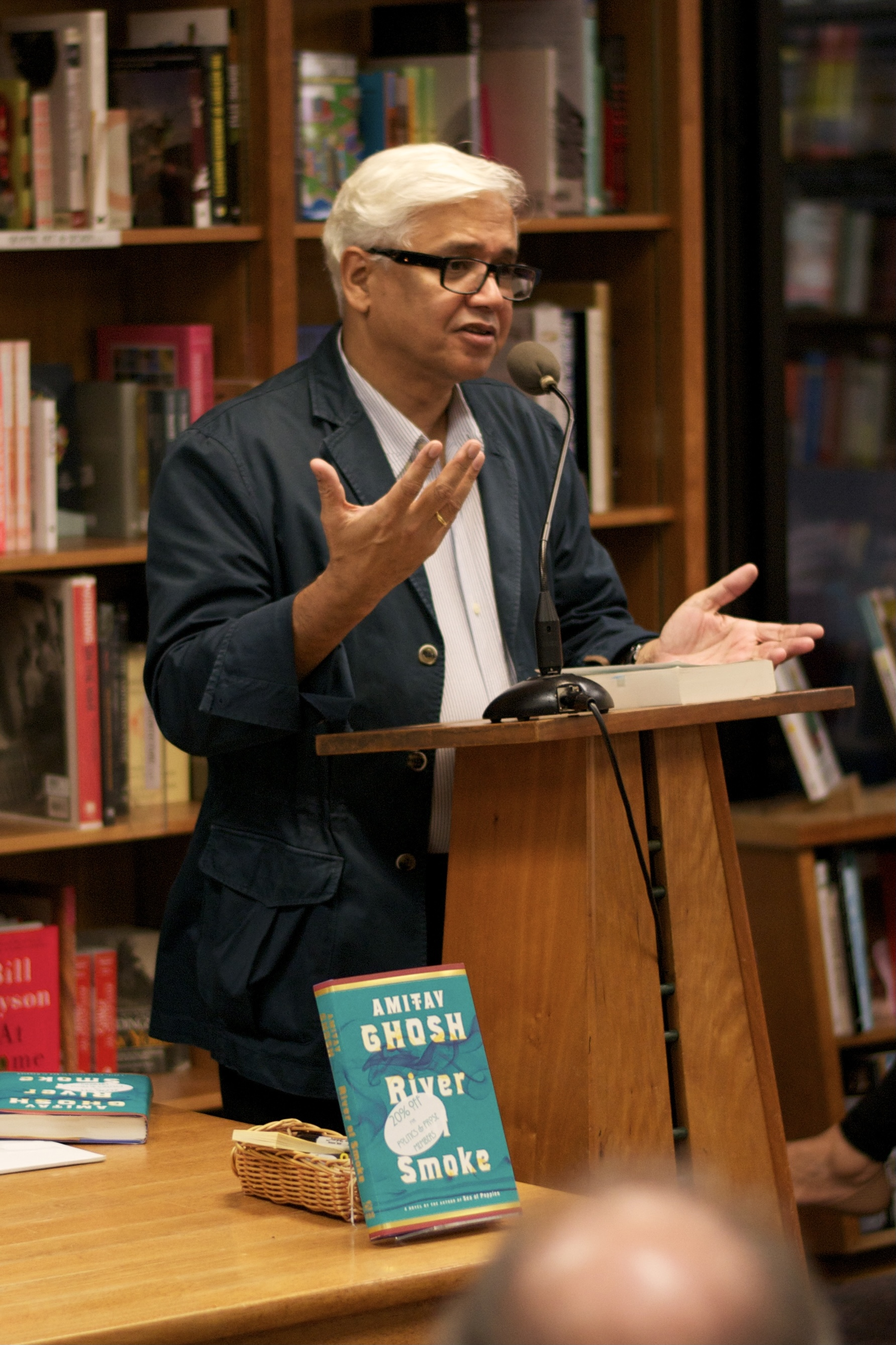
Ghosh promoting River of Smoke in 2011

The novel has received generally positive reviews from critics. David Davidar writing in Outlook notes, "Conventional wisdom has it that in the age of Twitter long striders in the world of fiction are doomed to extinction. Attention spans have dwindled, the pundits say, brevity is all, and the grand narrative is to be consigned to the trash heap. Well, thank God, Amitav Ghosh hasn't been paying attention to the so-called experts but has decided to go where his inclinations have led him. Generous helpings of humour, adventure (the hunt for the golden camellia was a favourite), history, romance, villainy and suspense are expertly blended into the narrative to make for a rich and entertaining read".

Anjana Rajan writing in The Hindu says, "To have read Sea of Poppies is no pre-condition to enjoy the second. What is perhaps a pre-condition is an appetite for detail, a taste for complexities, and a love for words and their strange journeys. Robin Chinnery's conversation transports us to Jane Austen's England. And we are charmed by the sing-song of pidgin as Chi-mei sympathises with Bahram."

Tessa Hadley in The Guardian says, "In historical novels the past can sometimes feel tamed; hindsight, hovering just off the page, tells us that we know what it all added up to and what came of it (the First Opium War, during which British gunboats enforced a treaty opening Chinese ports to international trade, comes shortly after the ending of this novel). But Ghosh's novels somehow succeed in taking us back inside the chaos of when 'then' was 'now'. His grasp of the detail of the period is exhaustive – he is so thoroughly submerged in it – that readers can't possibly remember all the things he shows them, or hold on to all the life-stories of all the characters he introduces." She also goes on to lament, "The novel feels stitched together clumsily in a few places. In particular, the section narrated in letters from Robin Chinnery (illegitimate, mixed-race and presumably fictional son of George Chinnery, a real-life painter of South China scenes) to Paulette the botanist, who appears in the previous book. Paulette is too absent and Robin feels like a contrivance to take us inside certain aspects of Canton life where Bahram can't go."

In Paste magazine, writer Zack Shlachter calls the Ibis trilogy "one of the most inspired explorations of global encounters by a 21st-century writer," noting that in River of Smoke Ghosh focuses on the simultaneous dangers and potential—for exploitation as for more benevolent kinds of exchange—inherent in trade.

The novel has received some awards and recognition. It was shortlisted for the 2011 The Hindu Literary Prize; longlisted for the 2011 Man Asian Literary Prize; and shortlisted for the 2013 DSC Prize for South Asian Literature. NPR listed the book as one of the year's best historical novels.
