= Soumya Bhattacharya =

Indian journalist and author

Soumya Bhattacharya (born 1969) is an Indian journalist and author.

== Life and career ==
Born in Kolkata, Bhattacharya grew up and studied in Kolkata and London. As a journalist, he has worked on The Times (London), The Sydney Morning Herald, India Today magazine (New Delhi), The Telegraph (Kolkata) and the Hindustan Times. He is currently the Editor of Hindustan Times, Mumbai.

His essays and literary criticism have appeared in a number of publications across the world, including The Guardian, The Observer, The Independent, New Statesman, "Granta" and Wisden in Britain; The Age and The Sydney Morning Herald in Australia; Sports Illustrated in South Africa; and The New York Times.

Bhattacharya's first book, a work of narrative non-fiction called You Must Like Cricket?, was published across the world to critical acclaim in 2006. Part reportage, part travelogue, part cultural politics, You Must Like Cricket? is a memoir that explores how India's identity got so closely tied to a game and the troubling hold that cricket has over him and a billion other of his countrymen.

Writing about the book in The Guardian (London), the cultural critic Mike Marqusee called it 'highly entertaining' and said it was an 'heir to a tradition harking back to cricket's first literary classic, John Nyren's The Cricketers of My Time, published in 1833.' You Must Like Cricket? was one of the notable books of the year for the award-winning Observer Sport Monthly magazine in the UK.

All That You Can't Leave Behind, Bhattacharya's second book, was a sort of sequel to You Must Like Cricket?It was published in India in 2009, and in the UK in 2011. Historian Ramachandra Guha called it 'a vivid and empathetic account of the highs an lows of cricket watching in contemporary India'. Writing about it, author and columnist Peter Roebuck said: 'Combining personal touches, socio-economics, emotion and statistics... it is a rich tale told with the sentiment of a supporter and acumen of a historian'.

Bhattacharya's third book (and first novel), If I Could Tell You, appeared almost simultaneously with All That You Can't Leave Behind in December 2009. A haunting and tender novel, If I Could Tell You has at its heart the universal themes of longing, love and loss. Written in prose of beauty and power, it is a story about how luck and chance and a twist in events can irrevocably alter our lives, how love can lead to catastrophe, and, ultimately, about how the new India can make - and then break - a man. Greeted by several glowing reviews, the novel entered India's national bestsellers list on publication. It was nominated for the Crossword Book Award, and shortlisted for The Hindu Best Fiction Award. The author Vikram Chandra wrote of it: "This is a remarkable novel by a writer whose work we will read for years to come."

He is most recently the author of the fatherhood memoir, "Dad's the Word".

Bhattacharya lives with his wife and daughter in Mumbai.
