= Jwala Kumar and the Gift of Fire: Adventures in Champakbagh =

2018 book by Hansda Sowvendra Shekhar

- Author: Hansda Sowvendra Shekhar
- Illustrator: Krishna Bala Shenoi
- Language: English
- Genre: Fiction, Middle grade, Chapter book
- Publisher: Talking Cub, an imprint of Speaking Tiger Books, New Delhi, India
- Publication date: 2018
- Publication place: India
- Media type: Print (paperback), E-book
- ISBN: 9789387693975
- Preceded by: The Adivasi Will Not Dance: Stories (2015)
- Followed by: My Father’s Garden (2018)

Jwala Kumar and the Gift of Fire: Adventures in Champakbagh is Indian author Hansda Sowvendra Shekhar’s first book for children. It is a novel and its reading level is age 9 years and above. This book features illustrations by Krishna Bala Shenoi. It was shortlisted for a 2019 Neev Book Award in the category Junior Readers and a 2019 Crossword Book Award in the children’s books category. One positive review has called this book "a must-read for the young to ask questions and to observe the differences in childhoods across India." In the year 2021, this book was reissued with a new title, Jwala Kumar and the Gift of Fire: The Dragon who came to Champakbagh. ISBN 9789354470264
