= Easterine Kire =

Indian-Norwegian poet and author

- Born: 29 March 1959 (age 67); Kohima, Nagaland (Union Territory) (Now Kohima, Nagaland, India)
- Education: North-Eastern Hill University
- Occupations: Author; poet
- Spouse(s): Kaka D. Iralu (died 2020)
- Children: 3
- Writing career
- Period: 1982–present
- Genres: Fiction; magical realism

Easterine Kire is an Naga poet and author from India who currently lives in northern Norway. The majority of her writings are based in the lived realities of the people in Nagaland in Northeast India. Apart from writing, she also performs Jazz poetry with her band Jazzpoesi.

== Early life ==
Easterine Kire was born on 29 March 1959 in Kohima to an Angami Naga family from Kohima Village. She did her schooling in Baptist English School. She went to pursue her undergraduate study in Shillong from North-Eastern Hill University, followed by a course in journalism in Delhi. She received a doctorate in English literature from Savitribai Phule Pune University.

== Books ==
Kire's motivation to write is summed up in her statement, "I felt we needed to create written Naga Literature. We have so much oral narratives but with oral dying out, it's all going to be lost." Majority of her writings are based in the lived realities of the people in Nagaland in north-east India. Apart from bringing a focus on the vibrant Naga culture, Kire's work has also brought out the realities which have changed the lives of Naga women.

In 2003, she wrote the first Naga novel in English, entitled, A Naga Village Remembered published then by Ura Academy. It documents the cultural and social history of the Angami Naga community living in Khonoma through the British invasion of the territory, advent of Christianity, and subsequent modernity. Thereby, the novel spans from 1832 to 1900. The novel was republished by Speaking Tiger Books in 2018 as Sky is my Father: A Naga Village Remembered gaining it wider readership.

Her second novel was A Terrible Matriarchy published in 2007. It highlights the internal and social strife that grips Nagaland as a state in India. It was republished by Zubaan Books in 2013. This was followed by Mari (2010). It is a novel based on the Japanese invasion of India in 1944 via Nagaland. Her subsequent novels include, Bitter Wormwood (2011) which was shortlisted for The Hindu Literary Prize in 2013, Don't Run, My Love (2017), and Walking the Roadless Road: Exploring the Tribes of Nagaland (2019).

Her latest book "Spirit Nights" was published in 2022. She has also written children's books, articles and essays. Her first children's book in English was published in 2011. Kire has also translated 200 oral poems from her native language.

== Poetry ==
Kire published her first book of poetry in 1982 titled Kelhoukevira, roughly translated as 'the place of a better life.' Many of the poems in the book portal the violence in Nagaland at the time. Naga academic Theyiesinuo Keditsu notes, "[The book] is an outcome of the poet's gendered positioning in the discursive Naga universe," where women are delegated to write poetry rather factual nonfiction account of people's situation. However, Kire's embracing of this form of literary work also allows her to escape state censorship. Kelhoukevira was the first book of Naga poetry published in English.

In December 2024, Kire published a collection of poetry titled, Freerain. The collection comprised 60 poems, including previously published works of hers.

Kire also performs Jazz poetry with her band Jazzpoesi in Norway.

== Publishing ==
Kire is a founder member of Barkweaver Publications which publishes folk tales, original research, and life stories of the Naga people.

== Awards and recognitions ==
In 2011 Easterine Kire was awarded the Governor's Medal for excellence in Naga literature.

In 2013 Kire was awarded the ‘Free Word' prize by Catalan PEN, Barcelona.

In 2015 her novel When the River Sleeps was awarded The Hindu Literary Prize.

In 2018 Easterine Kire poem "Son of the Thundercloud" has been awarded Bal Sahitya Puraskar by Sahitya Academy.

In 2024 her novel Spirit Nights won Sahitya Academy Award in 2024.

"A Terrible Matriarchy" was selected to be translated into UN languages. Furthermore, the books "A Terrible Matriarchy", "Mari", "Forest Song", "Naga Folktales Retold" and "A Naga Village Remembered" have been translated into German.
