= The Hindu Literary Prize =

Indian literary award

- Literary award
- Awarded for: Outstanding work by an Indian Author
- Sponsored by: The Hindu
- First award: 2010
- Final award: 2019
- Most recent winner: Tell Her Everything, Mirza Waheed (for fiction); India, Empire, and First World War Culture, Santanu Das (for non-fiction)
- Website: thehindulfl.com

The Hindu Literary Prize or The Hindu Best Fiction Award, established in 2010, is an Indian literary award sponsored by The Hindu Literary Review which is part of the newspaper The Hindu. It recognizes Indian works in English and English translation. The first year, 2010, the award was called The Hindu Best Fiction Award. Starting in 2018 a non-fiction category was included.

== Winners and shortlist ==
Blue Ribbon = winner.

2010

- Serious Men, Manu Joseph
- Eunuch Park, Palash Krishna Mehrotra
- The Pleasure Seekers, Tishani Doshi
- Venus Crossing, Kalpana Swaminathan
- Come, Before Evening Falls, Manjul Bajaj
- Saraswati Park, Anjali Joseph
- If I Could Tell You, Soumya Bhattacharya
- The Thing About Thugs, Tabish Khair
- The To-Let House, Daisy Hasan
- Way to Go, Upamanyu Chatterjee
- Neti, Neti, Anjum Hasan

2011

- The Sly Company of People Who Care by Rahul Bhattacharya
- Bharathipura, translated work of U. R. Ananthamurthy, translated by Sushila Punitha
- The Fakir, translated work of Sunil Gangopadhyay, translated by Monabi Mitra
- River of Smoke by Amitav Ghosh
- Litanies of Dutch Battery, translated work of N. S. Madhavan, translated by Rajesh Raja Mohan
- The Folded Earth by Anuradha Roy
- The Storyteller of Marrakesh by Joydeep Roy-Bhattacharya

2012

- Em and the Big Hoom by Jerry Pinto
- Narcopolis, Jeet Thayil
- The Extras, Kiran Nagarkar
- Difficult Pleasures, Anjum Hasan
- Bitter Wormwood, Easterine Kire

2013

- The Illicit Happiness of Other People, Manu Joseph
- Foreign, Sonora Jha
- Roll of Honour, Amandeep Sandhu
- Vanity Bagh, Anees Salim
- Another Man's Wife and Other Stories, Manjul Bajaj

2014

- The Competent Authority, Shovon Chowdhury
- Shadow Play, Shashi Deshpande
- A Bad Character, Deepti Kapur
- Idris, Keeper of the Light, Anita Nair
- The Mysterious Ailment of Rupi Baskey, Hansda Sowvendra Shekhar
- The Book of Common Signs, Ashok Srinivasan

2015

- Flood of Fire, Amitav Ghosh
- Odysseus Abroad, Amit Chaudhuri
- Seahorse, Janice Pariat
- Sleeping on Jupiter, Anuradha Roy
- The Patna Manual of Style, Siddharth Chowdhury
- When the River Sleeps, Easterine Kire

2016

- Half of What I Say, Anil Menon
- Jinnah Often Came To Our House, Kiran Doshi
- Kalkutta, Kunal Basu
- The Adivasi Will Not Dance: Stories, Hansda Sowvendra Shekhar
- The Island of Lost Girls, Manjula Padmanabhan

2017

- Leila, Prayaag Akbar
- When I Hit You, Meena Kandasamy
- The Ministry of Utmost Happiness, Arundhati Roy
- The Small Town Sea, Anees Salim
- Temporary People, Deepak Unnikrishnan

2018

- Fiction
  - Half the Night is Gone, Amitabha Bagchi
  - A Day in the Life, Anjum Hasan
  - All the Lives We Never Lived, Anuradha Roy
  - Poonachi, Perumal Murugan (translated from Tamil by N. Kalyan Raman)
  - The Aunt Who Wouldn't Die, Shirshendu Mukhopadhyay (translated from Bengali by Arunava Sinha)
  - Requiem in Raga Janki, Neelum Saran Gour
- Non-fiction
  - Interrogating my Chandal Life: An Autobiography of a Dalit, Manoranjan Byapari, translated from Bengali by Sipra Mukherjee
  - The Bengalis: A Portrait of a Community, Sudeep Chakravarti
  - Remnants of a Separation: A History of the Partition through Material Memory, Aanchal Malhotra
  - Indira Gandhi: A Life in Nature, Jairam Ramesh
  - The Most Dangerous Place:A History of the United States in South Asia, Srinath Raghavan

2019

- Fiction
  - The Assassination of Indira Gandhi, Upamanyu Chatterjee
  - Tell Her Everything, Mirza Waheed
  - The Queen of Jasmine Country, Sharanya Manivannan
  - Latitudes of Longing, Shubangi Swarup
  - Heat, Poomani, translated from Tamil by Kalyan Raman
- Non-fiction
  - Early Indians: The Story of Our Ancestors and Where We Came From, Tony Joseph
  - Polio: The Odyssey of Eradication, Thomas Abraham
  - The Transformative Constitution: A Radical Biography in Nine Acts, Gautam Bhatia
  - India, Empire, and First World War Culture, Santanu Das
  - The Anatomy of Hate, Revati Laul

== See also ==
- Lit for Life
