= Kunal Basu =

Indian author

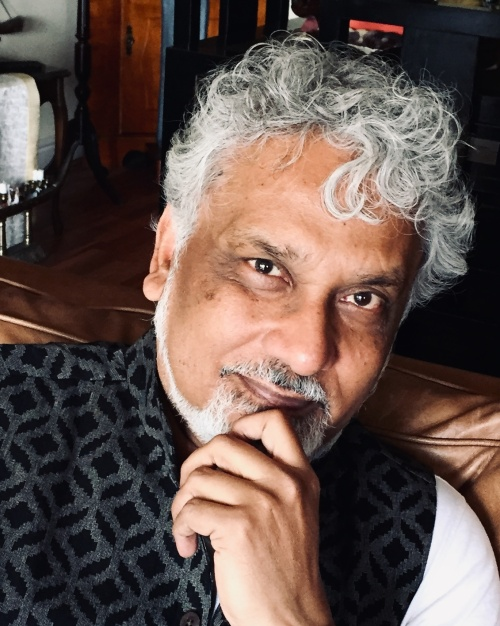
- Born: 4 May 1956 (age 70); Calcutta, West Bengal, India
- Occupations: University Reader in Marketing at Saïd Business School, University of Oxford
- Spouse: Susmita Basu
- Website: kunalbasu.com

Kunal Basu (Bengali: কুনাল বসু; born 4 May 1956) is an Indian author of English fiction who has written five novels – The Opium Clerk (2001), The Miniaturist (2003), Racists (2006), The Yellow Emperor's Cure (2011) Kalkatta (2015) and Sarojini’s Mother (2020). The title story of his only collection of short stories, The Japanese Wife (2008), was made into a film by the Indian filmmaker Aparna Sen. Basu has also written four Bengali novels – Rabi-Shankar (2016), Bairer Dorja (2017), Tejoswini O Shabnam (2018) and Angel(2020)

== Biography ==
Kunal Basu was born in Kolkata to Sunil Kumar Basu (a litterateur and publisher and one of the early members of the Communist Party of India) and Chabi Basu (an author and actress). Born to Communist parents, he was brought up on books and enriching conversations at home that was visited by a galaxy of prominent men and women of the day. He studied Mechanical Engineering at Jadavpur University. Throughout his student life, he was an active member and leader of SFI (Students' Federation of India – The student wing of the Communist Party of India (Marxist) – CPM) and also an active member of the Communist Party. During his SFI leadership, he carried out many protests, gherao (encirclement), class boycott, and roadblock and demonstration against Samrajjobadi (Imperialist) Western countries, especially against the United States of America. In between he worked for an advertising agency, in freelance journalism, dabbled in filmmaking, and taught at Jadavpur University for a brief period of 16 months. In 1982, he met and married Susmita. Their daughter, Aparajita, was born soon after.

Following his doctoral degree, he was a professor at McGill University, Montreal, Canada, from 1986 to 1999. His 13 years at McGill were interrupted only by a brief stint at the Indian Institute of Management Calcutta, in 1989. Since 1999, he has been teaching at Oxford University's Saïd Business School. He has also written financial pieces for business publications such as Fast Company and MIT Sloan Management Review.

== Influence and themes ==
Basu is one of the very few Indian practitioners of historical fiction. Apart from his love of history, it has something to do with the influence of his favourite author, the Bengali novelist Bankim Chandra Chattopadhyay (1838–94). Bankim (himself heavily influenced by Walter Scott) was a writer of historical novels, as were many other Bengali writers of the 19th and 20th centuries whom Basu avidly read as a child, like Ramesh Chandra Dutta and Sharadindu Bandyopadhyay. But more than anything, he has said what draws him most to this genre is the "romantic possibilities of the historical novel", the scope to inhabit other places and times and thus enable the reader to romance the strange.

== Bibliography ==
=== Novels ===
- The Opium Clerk, 2001

Hiran, the eponymous clerk of the title, is born in 1857: the year of Mutiny and the year his father dies. Brought to Calcutta by his widowed mother he turns out to have few talents, apart from an uncanny ability to read a man's lies in his palm. When luck gets him a job at the auction house, Hiran finds himself embroiled in a mysterious trade, and even more deeply embroiled in the affairs of his nefarious superior, the infamous Mr. Jonathan Crabbe and his opium addicted wife. An unlikely hero, Hiran is caught up in rebellion and war, buffeted by storms at sea, by love and intrigue, innocently implicated in fraud and dark dealings.

- The Miniaturist, 2003

Set in the Mughal court of Akbar the Great in the 16th century, this novel tells the story of Bihzad, son of the chief court painter. A child prodigy, Bihzad is groomed to take his father's place in the imperial court but the precocious and brilliant artist soon tires of imperial commissions and develops a grand and forbidden obsession. He leads a dual life – spending his nights painting the Emperor as his lover, and his days recording the Emperor's official biography in miniatures. But rumours about the wild, passionate nature of his secret drawings bring his enemies out into the open, who use his art to destroy him.

- Racists, 2006

1855: on a deserted island off the coast of Africa, the most audacious experiment ever envisaged is about to begin. To settle an argument that has raged inconclusively for decades, two scientists decide to raise a pair of infants, one black, one white, on a barren island, exposed to the dangers all around them, tended only by a young nurse whose muteness renders her incapable of influencing them in any way, for good or for bad. They will grow up without speech, without civilisation, without punishment or play. In this primitive environment, the children will develop as their primitive natures dictate.

- The Yellow Emperor's Cure, 2011

Lisbon, 1898: philandering surgeon Antonio Maria discovers his beloved father is dying of syphilis, scourge of both rich and poor. Determined to find a cure, Antonio sets sail for Peking in the hope that traditional Chinese medicine has the answer that eludes the West. But when Antonio encounters the alluringly independent Fumi, he finds the first love he cannot leave behind.

- Kalkatta, 2015

Jami is the Gigolo King of Kalkatta. Smuggled into India from Bangladesh and given refuge by his uncle, a leader of the ruling Communist Party, he grows up in Zakaria Street—a Little Baghdad of the old—dreaming of becoming a pukka Kalkatta-wallah. When friendship with a local gang disqualifies him from school, he ends up as assistant to a passport forger, and then a masseur. Soon enough, innocent massage leads to 'plus plus treatments', and Kalkatta opens its doors, drawing Jami into the world of the rich and famous, housewives, tourists and travelling executives, and occasionally to high-paying and dangerous 'parties '. Danger looms, too, from rivals and the police, and the ever-present risk of losing his cover. Jami's shadowy double life takes a turn for the unexpected when he meets Pablo, a young boy who suffers from leukemia, and his single mother Mandira. Made to oscillate between his refugee family, the neighbourhood gang, his massage-parlour clients, even the cultured world of Bengali intellectuals inhabited by Mandira, he succeeds in becoming a true Kalkattawallah, but a stranger to himself. Until his love for Pablo threatens to destroy everything, and even drive away from his beloved city.

The cover design of Kalkatta (by Pinaki De) won two awards – the best Cover Design of India award from Oxford Bookstore at the Jaipur Literary Festival in 2016, and the best Cover Design of India award in Publishing Next 2017.

• Sarojini’s Mother, 2020

Sarojini-Saz-Campbell comes to India to search for her biological mother. Adopted and taken to England at an early age, she has a degree from Cambridge and a mathematician's brain adept in solving puzzles. Handicapped by a missing shoebox that held her birth papers and the death of her English mother, she has few leads to carry out her mission and scant knowledge of Calcutta, her birthplace. Luckily, she has Chiru Sen, an Elvis lookalike, as her guide. Together, Saz and Chiru chase the mirage of a lost mother, helped by Chiru's band members and his friend Suleiman, master bookie of the racecourse.

When luck leads them to a slum, Jamuna, a housemaid with a troubled past, presents herself as the likely candidate. As Saz settles into the routine of slum life, a second candidate, Urvasi, presents herself, emerging from the very opposite end of the spectrum.

With Saz split in half, nothing is spared in the battle between the mothers, moving at a fast clip to the final throw of the dice as rivals await the result of DNA matching from their blood samples. But will the verdict of science settle the puzzle of motherhood for Sarojini? Or will it be left to the judgment of Suleiman the Wise, King of the Racecourse, the bearer of ancient wisdom, to arrive at that supreme revelation? (Synopsis, Penguin India website)

=== Short story collections ===
The Japanese Wife (2008)

An Indian man writes to a Japanese woman. She writes back. The pen-friends fall in love and exchange their vows over letters, then live as man and wife without ever setting eyes on each other, their intimacy of words tested finally by life's upheavals.

The 12 stories in this collection are about the unexpected and about lives that are never quite as ordinary as they seem. The title story was adapted on celluloid by the renowned filmmaker Aparna Sen, the cast including Indian actors Rahul Bose, Raima Sen and Moushumi Chatterjee, and Japanese actress Chigusa Takaku in the title role.

Bengali novels

Kunal Basu is the only bilingual English-Bengali novelist after Bankimchandra Chatterjee (who had given up writing in English after his first and only English novel, Rajmohan's Wife, 1864).

Basu has written three Bengali novels – Rabi-Shankar (2016), Bairer Dorja (2017) & Tejoswini O Shabnam (2018).

• Rabi-Shankar, 2016

This novel flits between contemporary and 1970's Calcutta. It is about two individuals who meet accidentally after 30 years. They had been mortal enemies during the Naxal period – one was a police officer and the other, a Naxalite. Each could have killed the other, and came very close to doing so. But 30 years later, the tide has turned, it is a different kind of world. The two individuals are in different stations in life: the ex-Naxal is now part of the affluent upper-middle class; and the police officer is a retired person, living a pretty ordinary life. They are awkward when they meet... and they do things to each other which they hadn't quite planned...

• Bairer Dorja, 2017

This novel was published by Sananda (a leading Bangla women's magazine) in their 2017 'Pujo-sankha' – their coveted annual Durga puja edition.

• Tejoswini O Shabnam, 2018

Set in New York, Iraq and Bengal, this novel is a story of two sisters who accidentally find each other in the backdrop of an ongoing war, bringing to the fore a murky story of human trafficking in the Gulf. This book has been translated into English as The Endgame by Arunava Sinha (Picador Books India, 2019).

From a literary history point of view, this translation has a special literary significance because it is not the English translation of a book by a vernacular writer, but the work of an established English novelist in his own bhasha having a fresh life in English.

Translations of Basu's work

Kunal Basu's novels have been translated into several foreign languages.

January 2020 saw Chitrakar – the Hindi translation of his second novel, The Miniaturist – being published by Vani Prakashan. The translation has been done by Prabhat Milind.

Non-fiction

Intimacies, 2011

Kunal Basu collaborated with photographer Kushal Ray for this book. It contains 8000 photographs, all of them shot inside a 12-room house with 10 residents – who have lost out in the race for success. Poised between fiction and facts, Basu's narrative brings to life the remarkable world of the photographer and the photographed

== See also ==
- List of Indian writers
