= Anuradha Roy (novelist) =

Indian novelist, journalist and editor (born 1967)

- Born: 1967 (age 58–59); Calcutta (now Kolkata), West Bengal, India
- Education: University of Calcutta; University of Cambridge
- Occupation: Novelist
- Spouse: Rukun Advani
- Writing career
- Genres: Novel, postcolonial
- Subject: Post-modernism
- Website: anuradharoy.blogspot.com?m=1

Anuradha Roy (born 1967) is an Indian novelist, journalist and editor. She has written five novels: An Atlas of Impossible Longing (2008), The Folded Earth (2011), Sleeping on Jupiter (2015), All the Lives We Never Lived (2018), and The Earthspinner (2021).

== Biography ==
Roy and her husband, publisher Rukun Advani, live in Ranikhet.

== Career ==
=== Writing ===
Roy's first novel, An Atlas of Impossible Longing, was picked up for publication after she shared initial pages with writer and publisher Christopher MacLehose, and has been translated into eighteen languages. It was named by World Literature Today as one of the "60 Essential English Language Works of Modern Indian Literature".

Sleeping on Jupiter, her third novel, won the DSC Prize for South Asian Literature and was longlisted for the Man Booker Prize.

Her fourth novel, All the Lives We Never Lived, won the Tata Book of the Year Award for Fiction 2018. It was longlisted for the Walter Scott Prize for Historical Fiction 2018. It was shortlisted for the International Dublin Literary Award 2020. In December 2022, it won India's most prestigious literary prize, the Sahitya Akademi Award, given by India's literary academy to a work written in any genre in English.

The Earthspinner, her fifth novel, was published by Hachette India and the Mountain Leopard Press, London, in September 2021. The novel won the Sushila Devi Book Award 2022 for the best novel by a woman writer in India. It was shortlisted for the Tata Book of the Year Award for Fiction 2022, as well as the Rabindranath Tagore Literary Prize 2022. In December 2023, the French translation of this novel, titled Le Cheval en Feu, was hailed by Radio France as its literary discovery of the year.

Her essays and reviews have appeared in newspapers and magazines in India (Indian Express; Telegraph; The Hindu), the US (Orion and Noema) and Britain (Guardian, The Economist), and most recently in John Freeman, ed., Tales of Two Planets.

=== Publishing ===
Advani and Roy founded Permanent Black, a publishing company focusing on academic literature, in 2000, and Roy is a designer for the company. Roy had previously worked with Stree, an Indian independent publisher in Kolkata. She was a Commissioning Editor at Oxford University Press, India, a job she quit in 2000.

== Novels ==
- An Atlas of Impossible Longing (2008)
- The Folded Earth (2011)
- Sleeping on Jupiter (2015)
- All the Lives We Never Lived (2018)
- The Earthspinner (2021)

== Awards and honors ==
- 2004 The Outlook/Picador India Non-Fiction Competition, "Cooking Women"
- 2011 The Hindu Literary Prize, shortlist, The Folded Earth
- 2011 Man Asian Literary Prize, longlist, The Folded Earth
- 2011 Economist Crossword Book Award, winner, The Folded Earth
- 2015 The Hindu Literary Prize, shortlist, Sleeping on Jupiter
- 2015 Man Booker Prize, longlist, Sleeping on Jupiter
- 2016 DSC Prize for South Asian Literature, winner, Sleeping on Jupiter
- 2018 JCB Prize, shortlist, All the Lives We Never LivedInternational Dublin Literary Award shortlist announced: Anuradha Roy’s ‘All the Lives We Never Lived’ makes the cut
- 2019 The Hindu Literary Prize, shortlist, All the Lives We Never Lived
- 2019 Tata Book of the Year Award for Fiction 2018, winner, All the Lives We Never Lived
- 2019 Walter Scott Prize for Historical Fiction 2018, longlist, All the Lives We Never Lived
- 2020 International Dublin Literary Award 2020, shortlist, All the Lives We Never Lived
- 2022 Sushila Devi Award for Best Novel 2022, winner, The Earthspinner and Rabindranath Tagore Literary Prize 2022, shortlisted.
- 2022 Sahitya Akademi Award, All the Lives We Never Lived
