= Niraja Gopal Jayal =

Indian political scientist

Academic work
- Institutions: London School of Economics, King's College London

Niraja Gopal Jayal is an Indian political scientist, who works on issues concerning citizenship, representation, and democracy. She is currently a professor at both, King's College London and the London School of Economics, in the United Kingdom, and previously taught at the Jawaharlal Nehru University in New Delhi, India.

== Career ==
Jayal taught at Jawaharlal Nehru University from 1986, and was associated with their Centre for the Study of Law and Governance. In October 2021, she joined the King's India Institute at King's College London, in the United Kingdom, holding the Avantha Chair. From 2019 to 2023, she is also a Centennial Professor at the Department of Gender Studies in the London School of Economics, in the United Kingdom.

In 2009, Jayal was invited to deliver the Radhakrishnan Memorial Lectures at All Souls College, Oxford University. In 2019, she was invited to deliver lectures on Indian democracy at the M.S. Merian – R. Tagore International Centre of Advanced Studies, a collaborative project involving six Indian and German institutions. She has also held visiting positions at EHESS, France; Princeton University in the United States of America; and the University of Melbourne in Australia. In 2011–2012, she was a vice-president of the American Political Science Association. Jayal is also a trustee of the New India Foundation, a philanthropic organisation in India that funds academic research.

She is a member of the editorial boards of several political science journals, including Governance (2016 to present), Pacific Affairs (2015 to present); Indian Politics and Policy (Policy Studies Organization; American Political Science Association) (2017- to present); International Feminist Journal of Politics (2011–17); India Review (2002 to present); Studies in Indian Politics (2013–present); Parliamentary Affairs (2019–2024), and is an editor of the Modern South Asia Series of books published by Oxford University Press (2017 to present).

In 2013, Jayal was a member of a committee established by the Ministry of Finance, in the Government of India, to establish a new composite index to measure backwardness in Indian states. She has also served on advisory committees to the Government of India's Ministry of Panchayati Raj (rural local governance), and as part of a committee established to review the functioning of the Indian Council of Social Science Research. In 2008, she was commissioned by the Government of India's Ministry of Panchayati Raj (rural local governance) to study the representation of women in local rural governance councils called panchayats, which formed part of the basis for a proposed Women's Reservation Bill that would reserve 50% of seats on such council for women (the bill did not pass). From 2002 to 2005, Jayal worked with UNRISD on their Ethnic Structure, Inequality and Governance of the Public initiative, authoring and publishing a report on Ethnic Diversity and the Governance of Public Institutions in India.

Gopal has criticized the Indian Government's proposed National Register of Citizens and Citizenship Amendment Act 2019, particularly noting legal challenges in establishing and implementing both, as well the shift towards an ethno-nationalist conception of India, and related political violence against religious minorities.

== Publications and honors ==
Jayal's book, Citizenship and Its Discontents (Harvard University Press, 2013), won the Ananda Kentish Coomaraswamy Prize of the Association of Asian Studies in 2015 and was reviewed in The Hindu, Foreign Affairs, The American Historical Review, and Economic and Political Weekly.

Her other publications include:

- Representing India: Ethnic Diversity and the Governance of Public Institutions (Palgrave Macmillan 2006) ISBN 9781403986122
- Democracy and the State: Welfare, Secularism and Development in Contemporary India (Oxford University Press 1999) ISBN 9780195656121
- (with Sudha Pai) Democratic governance in India : challenges of poverty, development, and identity (Sage Publications 2001) ISBN 9780761995562
- (co-editor with Pratap Bhanu Mehta), The Oxford Companion to Politics in India ISBN 9780198075929
- (editor) Democracy in India (Oxford University Press 2001)
- (editor) Local Governance in India: Decentralisation and Beyond (Oxford University Press 2005) ISBN 9780195692969
- Citizenship and Its Discontents (Harvard University Press, 2013) ISBN 9780674066847
- Citizenship imperilled : India's fragile democracy (Orient Blackswan 2021) ISBN 9788178246451
