= Lit for Life =

Annual literary festival

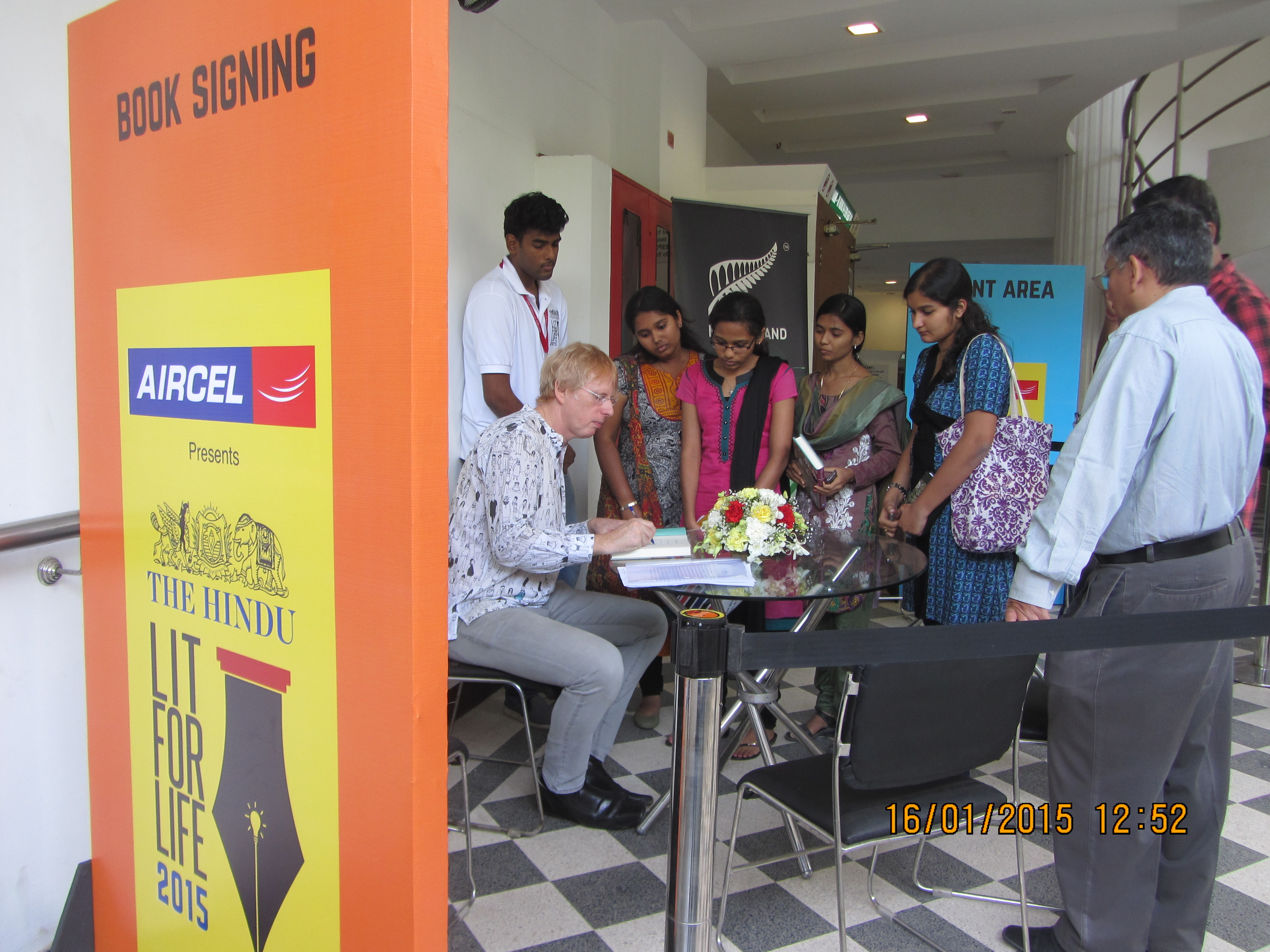
Jonathan Gil Harris signing at Lit for Life 2015.

Lit for Life is an annual literary festival organised by the English daily The Hindu in Chennai, India. The festival was inaugurated in 2010, where it was part of the celebration of the 20th anniversary of The Hindu's Literary Review. In 2011 the Lit for Life became an independent one-day event. It has over the years developed into a three-day festival of literature and thought, featuring notable authors and speakers from all over the world. In 2020, the festival, that always takes place in mid-January, will celebrate its 10th anniversary. Main initiator and organiser of the Lit for Life is Dr Nirmala Lakshman, Director of The Hindu Group of Publications, and Chairperson of the Board of The Hindu Tamil.

== Editions ==
=== 1st Edition (2010) ===
The festival was inaugurated in 2010.

=== 2nd Edition (2011) ===
The second edition was a one-day event held on 25 September 2011.

=== 3rd Edition (2013) ===
The third edition was held in two cities: Delhi hosted the festival on 6 February before the programme continued ten days later, on 16 and 17 February, in Chennai. The festival has been aligned with the announcement of The Hindu Literary Prize winner. Both the Lit for Life and the literature award were inaugurated in 2010 but were not connected until since 2013. The shortlist was announced at the first day in Delhi and the award distribution marked the finale of the festival.

=== 4th Edition (2014) ===
The fourth edition of the event was held in Chennai during 12 to 14 January 2014. The name of the recipient of The Hindu Literary Prize for the year 2013, Anees Salim, was announced by novelist Jim Crace during the valedictory function of the festival.

=== 5th Edition (2015) ===
The fifth edition was held from 16 to 18 January 2015.

=== 6th Edition (2016) ===
The sixth edition was held from 15 to 17 January 2016. A new element was added with The Hindu Lit for Life Annual Lecture Series.

=== 7th Edition (2017) ===
The seventh edition of the festival was held from 14 to 16 January 2017. Parallelly, a Children's Fest to engage children between 5 and 12 years with literature was inaugurated.

=== 8th Edition (2018) ===
The eighth edition of the festival was held from 14 to 16 January 2018. For the first time, it featured a festival on Tamil literature.

=== 9th Edition (2019) ===
The 9th edition of The Hindu Lit for Life was held from 12 to 14 January 2019.

==== Zero-Waste Initiative ====
With encouragement from The Hindu and the support of the Chennai Kalai Theru Vizha, itself a Zero Waste festival, Lit for Life 2019 was branded a Zero Waste event.

Zero waste is an approach that seeks to reduce, and eventually eliminate, the amount of material sent to landfills or incinerators. It involves recycling, reuse, composting, and anaerobic digestion of organic waste into biogas, as well as reducing the use of disposable products and redesigning goods to be non-toxic and longer-lasting.

Zero Waste initiatives aim to make such events more environmentally sustainable and socially just. Their environmental footprint is reduced while the social footprint is enlarged.

An integral part of the Zero Waste-LFL was not only to impose a ban on disposable materials, but also invoke a mind change in the event's audience. Zero Waste is, therefore, not a prefabricated scheme, but a continuous process within society.

The Chennai Kalai Theru Vizha and a team of volunteers hosted a Zero Waste-counter to engage with the Lit for Life visitors on topics such as composting or the Tamil Nadu Plastics Ban. On stage performances and interactions featured Indian Administrative Service officer Rajendra Ratnoo, who is responsible for facilitating the plastics ban in the state, rapper Sofia Ashraf and Carnatic musician Vignesh Ishwar.

Visitors contributed to minimising waste through the BYOB (Bring your own Bottle, Bag and Bicycle) – campaign. They were asked to skip single-use plastic products and bring refillable bottles and bags. Additionally, visitors were encouraged to bring their bicycles instead of coming by motorized vehicles. In addition, those who used public transport were rewarded.

In accordance with the Tamil Nadu Plastics Ban, single use plastic covers and cutlery were banned from the venue and food vendors where prohibited from selling water in plastic bottles. Organic cutlery and plates were used instead. The festival managed to avoid the use of 2,400 plastic bottles.

Recognizing Zero Waste as a continuous journey, the 9th edition of Lit for Life was seen as a baseline year. Through comprehensive audits on waste generation, material use, transport and water consumption, the festival hopes to become entirely zero waste in the upcoming years.
