= Sea of Poppies =

2008 novel by Amitav Ghosh

- First edition (India)
- Author: Amitav Ghosh
- Language: English
- Series: Ibis trilogy
- Genre: Novel
- Publisher: Viking Press (India)
- Publication date: 14 October 2008
- Publication place: India
- Media type: Print (hardback)
- Pages: 528
- ISBN: 978-0-374-17422-4
- OCLC: 216941700
- Dewey Decimal: 823/.914 22
- LC Class: PR9499.3.G536 S43 2008
- Followed by: River of Smoke

Sea of Poppies (2008) is a novel by Indian writer Amitav Ghosh which was shortlisted for the Man Booker Prize in 2008. It is the first volume of the Ibis trilogy. In the words of Rajnish Mishra, "the Ibis trilogy is Ghosh's most vehement indictment of the source of imperialism and colonialism." The second volume is River of Smoke.

The main characters include Deeti, an ordinary village woman, an "octoroon" American sailor named Zachary Reid, an Indian rajah / zamindar called Neel Rattan Halder, and Benjamin Burnham, an evangelist opium trader.

The story is set prior to the First Opium War, on the banks of the holy river Ganges and in Calcutta. The author compares the Ganges to the Nile, the lifeline of the Egyptian civilization, attributing the provenance and growth of these civilizations to these selfless, ever-flowing bodies. He portrays the characters as poppy seeds emanating in large numbers from the field to form a sea, where every single seed is uncertain about its future.

== Plot ==
The novel interweaves the stories of a number of characters, who all, in the latter half of the novel, find themselves taking passage from Calcutta to Mauritius on a schooner named the Ibis.

The story begins with Deeti, a simple, pious lady, caring mother and an efficient housewife. Married to Hukam Singh, a crippled worker in the Ghazipur Opium Factory, the unfortunate Deeti figures out that on her wedding night, she was drugged with opium by her mother-in-law, so that her brother-in-law could rape her and consummate the marriage in place of her impotent husband. This brother-in-law is the real father of Deeti's daughter Kabutri. When her husband dies, Deeti sends Kabutri to stay with relatives. Deeti looks almost certain to meet her doom when she is forced to consider sati ritual (immolation on her husband's funeral pyre) as the only option in the face of threats of more rapes by the brother-in-law, but then Kalua, the untouchable caste ox man from the neighbouring village, comes to her rescue. The couple flee and unite. This is not acceptable to the high caste villagers. In order to escape Deeti's in-laws, she and Kalua become indentured servants, travelling on the Ibis.

The next key figure is Zachary Reid, an American sailor born to a quadroon mother and a white father. Escaping racism, he joins the Ibis on its first voyage for its new owner, Mr. Burnham, from Baltimore to Calcutta. A series of misfortunes soon befall the ship, leading to the loss of more senior crew. With the support of the head of the lascars, Serang Ali, Zachary becomes the second in command of the ship. In Calcutta, Zachary is mistaken for a gentleman and enjoys society life. He becomes second mate for the Ibis's next voyage, carrying indentured labour to the island of Mauritius.

Neel Rattan Halder, a wealthy and unworldly rajah whose dynasty has been ruling the zemindary of Raskhali for centuries, is confronted by Mr. Burnham with the need to sell off his estates in order to pay for the debt he had incurred when investing in the opium trade with China. Now that the trade has come to a standstill, as a result of the resistance shown by the Chinese authorities, he is unable to clear his debt. When Mr. Burnham proposes to settle the loan for Halder's zamindary, Halder refuses the deal, as the zamindary is his family's ancestral property and selling it would mean turning his back on his many dependents. In a trial orchestrated by Burnham and his cronies, Halder is tried for forgery. The court sentences him to penal transportation for seven years in Mauritius, leading him to lose caste. In prison he meets Ah Fatt, a half-Chinese, half-Parsi opium addict from Canton, and the two are put aboard the Ibis.

Paulette is a French orphan who has grown up in India with Jodu, the son of her ayah, as her best friend. Her father was a politically radical botanist, her mother died in childbirth, and her grandparents were the historically inspired Jeanne and Philippe Commerson. Mr. and Mrs. Burnham take Paulette in after her father's death. Paulette feels more at ease with Indian manners, food, and clothing than with Western ones, but the Burnham household fiercely disapproves. Paulette meets Zachary Reid, the American sailor, at a dinner at the Burnhams'; they are mutually attracted. Paulette becomes determined to run away because of sexual harassment by Mr. Burnham and pressure to marry his friend, the stern, elderly Justice Kendalbushe. She resolves to travel to Mauritius, as her great-aunt did, in the hope of finding a better future. Jodu and Paulette separately gain passage on the Ibis, Jodu as a lascar and Paulette in disguise as the Indian niece of one of Mr. Burnham's employees.

Numerous plot developments are facilitated by Nob Kissin Baboo, a Vaishnavite would-be priest who is working as an overseer for Mr. Burnham and comes to believe that Zachary is an avatar of Krishna.

As the stories converge, the Ibis becomes a shelter to these various misfits and exiles. A crisis on board is precipitated when Jodu is violently punished for talking to one of the women being transported. He is imprisoned with Halder and Ah Fatt and, along with Serang Ali, whose secret piratical past has become known, hatches a plan to escape. Meanwhile, Deeti intercedes on behalf of the woman, but is recognised by a relative, who tries to rape her and flog Kalua. Kalua manages to kill him. The novel closes with Neel, Ah Fatt, Jodu, Serang Ali and Kalua escaping in a longboat towards Singapore, while Deeti, Paulette, and Zachary proceed towards Mauritius.

== Awards ==
Sea of Poppies won the 2008 Vodafone Crossword Book Award for Fiction. It was shortlisted for the 2008 Man Booker Prize. It won the 2008 British Book Design and Production Award. Sea of Poppies also won the Indiaplaza Golden Quill Award for best novel and Indiaplaza Golden Quill Popular Vote Award in 2009. It also received the prestigious Tagore Literature Award, awarded by Sahitya Akademi in 2012.
