= Hachette India =

Publishing company owned by Hachette Livre

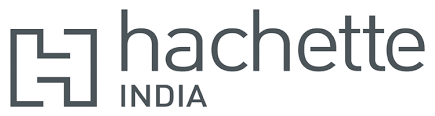
- Parent company: Hachette Livre
- Founded: 2008
- Country of origin: India
- Headquarters location: Gurugram, Haryana
- Key people: Thomas Abraham (managing director)
- Official website: hachetteindia.com

Hachette India is the Indian arm of the publishing company Hachette, which is owned by the French group, Lagardère Publishing. It started operations in India in 2008, and is currently the second-largest publishing house in the country, behind Penguin India, for non-education books.
