= Ben Ezra Synagogue =

Former synagogue in Cairo, Egypt

- Hebrew: בית כנסת בן עזרא; Arabic: معبد بن عزرا
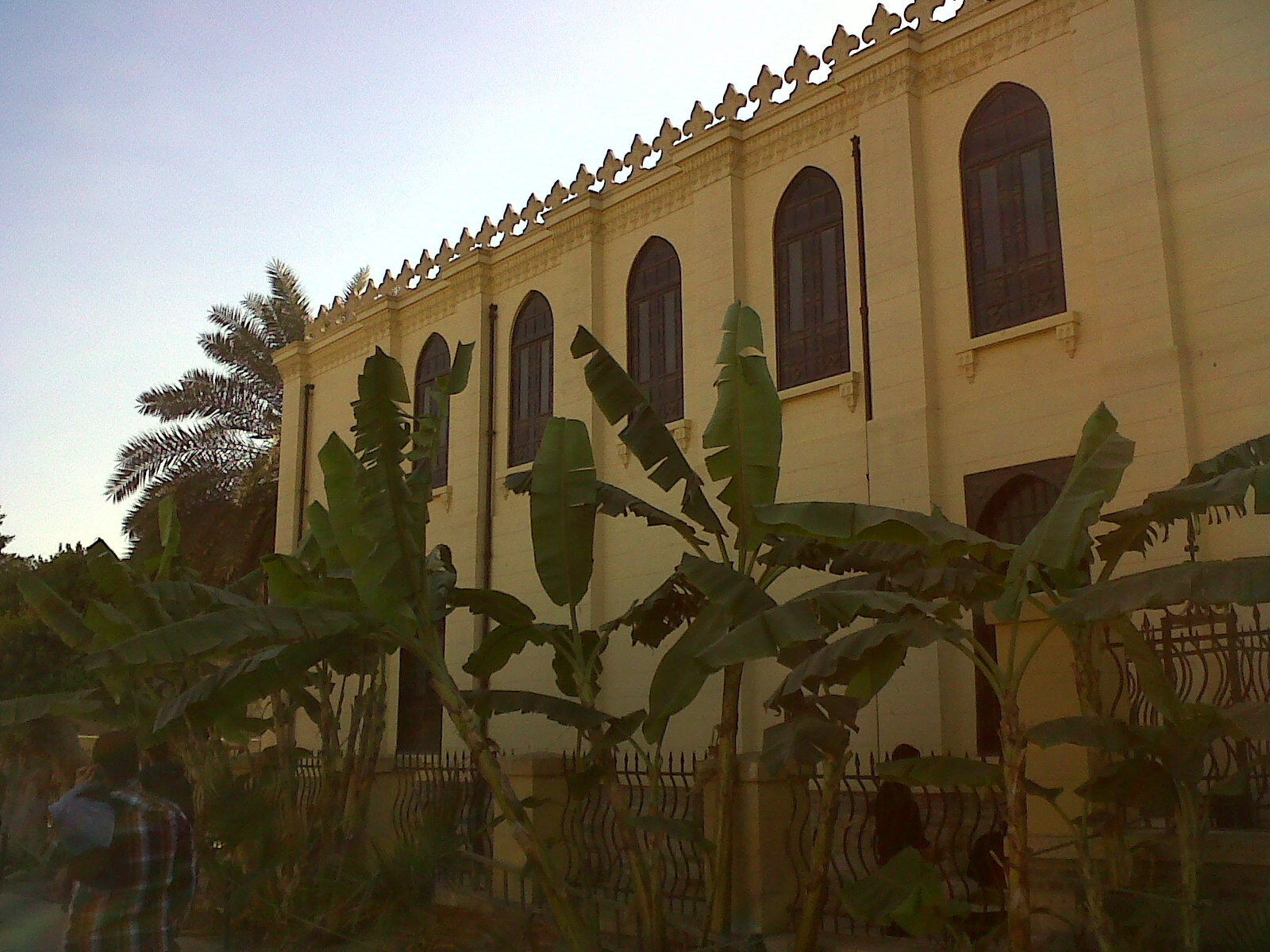
- The former synagogue, now Jewish museum, in 2011

- Location of the former synagogue, now museum, relative to the Nile Delta

Religion
- Affiliation: Judaism
- Rite: Eretz Israel minhag
- Ecclesiastical or organisational status: Synagogue; Jewish museum and tourist site
- Status: Inactive (as a synagogue); Repurposed

Location
- Location: Fustat, Old Cairo
- Country: Egypt
- Administration: Ministry of Tourism and Antiquities
- Coordinates: 30°00′21″N 31°13′51″E

Specifications
- Direction of façade: Southeast
- Length: 17 meters (56 ft)
- Width: 11.3 meters (37 ft)

The Ben Ezra Synagogue (Hebrew: בית כנסת בן עזרא, romanized: Beit Knesset Ben Ezra; Arabic: معبد بن عزرا, romanized: Maʻbad ibn ʻAzrā), sometimes referred to as the Geniza Synagogue (Hebrew: בית כנסת הגניזה, romanized: Beit Knesset haGenizah), originally the Synagogue of the Levantines (Judeo-Arabic: כניסת אלשאמיין), (Note: Also translated as the "Synagogue of the Syrians" or the "Synagogue of the Palestinians.") or the Synagogue of the Jerusalemites (Judeo-Arabic: כנסית הירושלמים) is a former Jewish congregation and synagogue, located in the Fustat part of Old Cairo, Egypt. According to local folklore, it is located on the site where baby Moses was found.

Given the small population of Egyptian Jews, the synagogue is no longer active and is largely a tourism site and Jewish museum.

The geniza or store room of the synagogue was found in the 19th century to contain a treasure of forgotten, stored-away secular and sacred manuscripts in Hebrew, Aramaic, Judeo-Arabic, and other languages. The collection of approximately 400,000 items, known as the Cairo Geniza, was brought to the University of Cambridge in Cambridge, England at the instigation of Solomon Schechter. It is now divided between several academic libraries, with the majority being kept at the Cambridge University Library.

== History ==
=== Outline ===
The Ben Ezra Synagogue has occupied at least three buildings in its long history. There have been many major and minor renovations. The current building dates from the 1890s. In a courtyard behind the buildings is the Well of Moses, in a fenced enclosure with a protective grill on its top. In local folklore, this is where the biblical Moses, as an infant, was hidden by his mother Jocheved, and watched over by his sister Miriam, until found and adopted by the Pharaoh's daughter; and where Mary drew water to bathe the infant Jesus.

=== Establishment ===
The Ben Ezra Synagogue's founding date is unknown, although there is good evidence from documents found in the geniza that it predates 882 CE and is probably pre-Islamic. In 882, the Pope of the Coptic Orthodox Church sold a church and its grounds to a group of Jews, and some 19th-century scholars have assumed that this was the origin of Ben Ezra. However, the buyers were followers of the Talmudic academies in Babylonia, and Ben Ezra was a congregation that observed the teachings of the rival Talmudic academies in Syria Palaestina. Modern scholars agree that the 882 land sale was to a rival synagogue.

Little is known about the original building. In about 1012, the Fatimid caliph Al-Hakim bi-Amr Allah ordered the destruction of all Jewish and Christian places of worship. The original Ben Ezra Synagogue was torn down, "its bricks and timber sold for scrap".

=== Second building (11th century – 1168) ===
The next caliph, al-Zahir li-i'zaz Din Allah, allowed the reconstruction of Christian and Jewish institutions, and the synagogue was rebuilt in the 1025–1040 period. Study of a carved wood Torah ark door reliably attributed to the synagogue sheds light on the history of the synagogue's renovations. The door is jointly owned by the Walters Art Museum in Baltimore, and the Yeshiva University Museum in New York. Radiocarbon dating verifies that the wood dates from the 11th century CE.

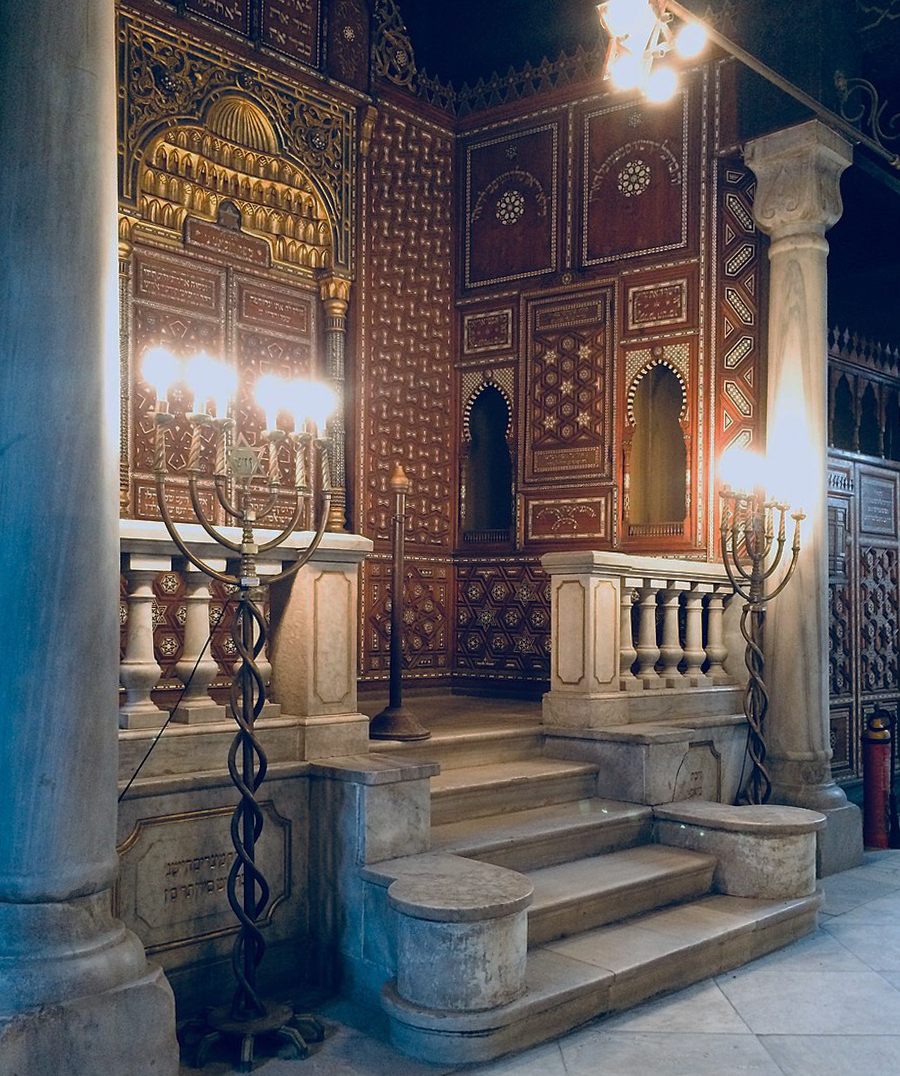
Interior of the synagogue

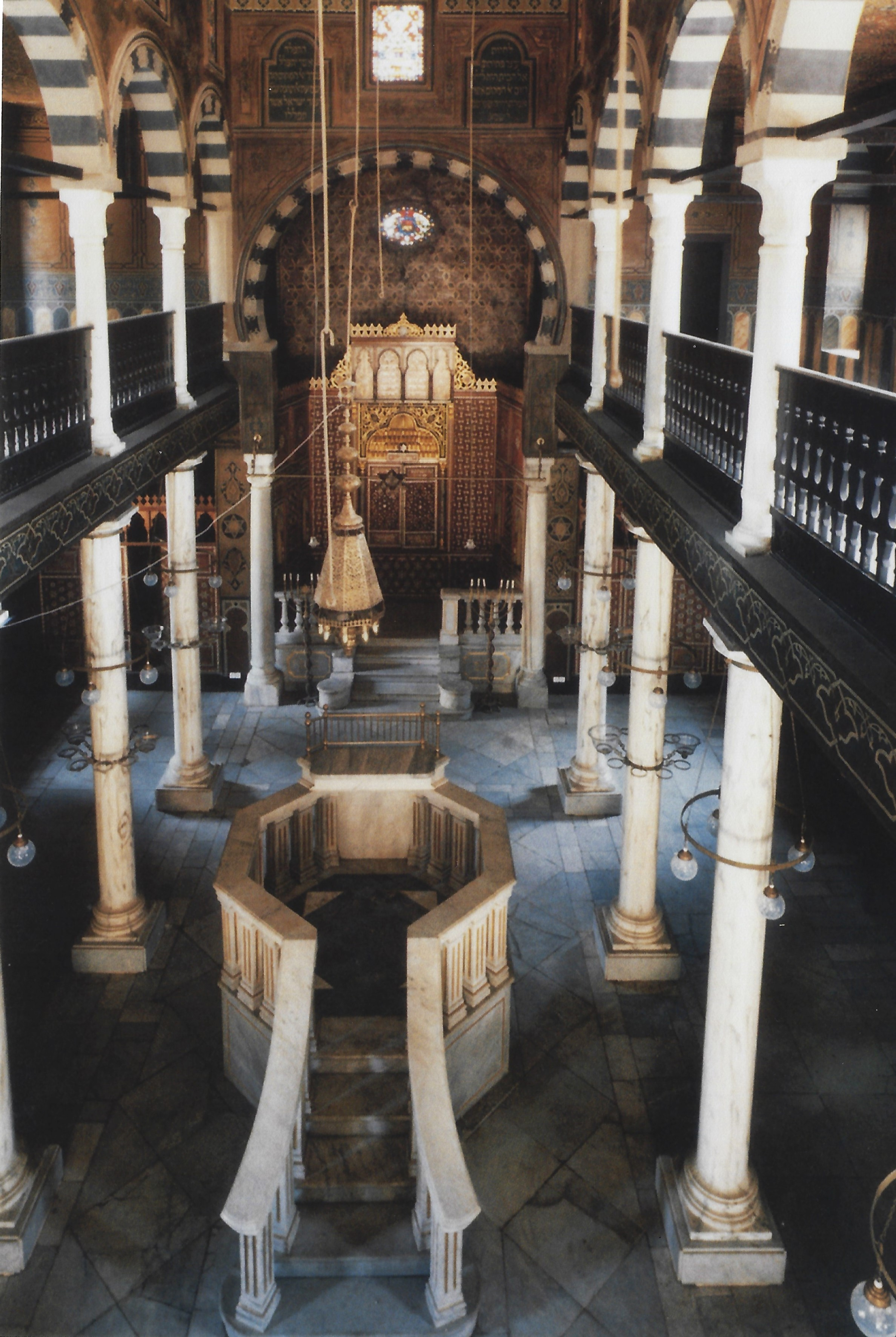
Interior of the Ben Ezra Synagogue from the upper gallery (mechitza)

==== Geniza ====
Historically, synagogues have included a genizah, or repository for abandoned or outdated documents containing the name of God, since Jewish teaching is that such papers had to be stored with reverence, and then eventually buried in a cemetery. The 11th-century building incorporated an unusually large geniza, "two stories high, more silo than attic – with a rooftop opening accessible from above." Some documents added to it had been stored in the previous building, and the oldest dated document is about 150 years older than the geniza itself. Documents continued to accumulate there for about 850 years. The diverse collection of documents included rabbinical texts, historical accounts, and religious and secular poems, dating from the sixth century through the nineteenth century CE.

==== 1168 fire ====
In 1168, a deliberately set fire destroyed much of the city of Fustat, where the synagogue was then located. Fustat is now a part of Cairo. The Islamic vizier Shawar ordered the city burned to prevent it from falling into the hands of an invading army led by Amalric of Jerusalem. Saladin, who became Sultan of Egypt shortly thereafter, ordered the rebuilding of Fustat.

=== Third building ===
==== Maimonides in Fustat (1168–1204) ====
Also in 1168, the Jewish philosopher, physician and astronomer Maimonides settled in Fustat, within a short walk of Ben Ezra Synagogue. He lived there until his death in 1204. Maimonides became Nagid, or leader of the Egyptian Jewish community in 1171, and worshipped at Ben Ezra. Many of the geniza documents, including some in his own handwriting, discuss his life and work, and are the most important primary biographical sources for him.

==== Torah ark ====
The style of the carving on the Torah ark door is incompatible with that of the Fatimid Caliphate (909–1171 CE), and is more representative of the Mamluk Sultanate (1250–1571 CE), specifically the 15th century. A medallion that decorates the door is designed with a motif common to bookbinding of that period. It is known that a 15th-century fire in the synagogue damaged the bimah, or pulpit. One plausible theory is that wood from the damaged bimah was repurposed to make a new door for the Torah ark. The synagogue was repaired and renovated in 1488.

The door also has traces of paint that conservators have identified as being no older than 19th century. It is known that the synagogue was renovated in the 1880s, completely rebuilt in the early 1890s, and then remodeled in the early 20th century.

=== Discovery of the geniza and fourth building ===
Jacob Saphir was a Jew born in what is today Belarus whose family settled in Ottoman Palestine when he was a boy. He became a rabbi, and in 1859, took a world tour to raise money for the reconstruction of the Hurva Synagogue in Jerusalem, which had been destroyed by the Muslim authorities in 1721. Saphir was the first to recognize the historic significance of the Ben Ezra geniza, which he described in an 1874 book. Jewish book collector Elkan Nathan Adler was the first Western European to enter the geniza in 1896, when he purchased a sackful of selected documents. In December 1896, Cambridge University instructor Solomon Schechter, who later became a prominent American rabbi, began the first in-depth academic investigation of the documents from the geniza, and arranged to have a large selection removed from Cairo to his university library. While the synagogue was being rebuilt from 1889 to 1892, the documents lay in an enormous pile out in the open. Egyptologist Count Riamo d'Hulst, arriving after Schechter's departure, hired a team of workers and spent 55 days excavating and examining as much of the documents as he could, and in May 1898 sent 16 large sacks of material to the Bodleian Library.

=== Dwindling congregation ===
Egypt's Jewish community is at the end of a dramatic decline, from about 80,000 people in the 1920s to less than a dozen of Egyptian ancestry residing in Cairo after 2014. Accordingly, the Ben Ezra Synagogue functions now as a tourist attraction and museum, rather than as a functioning congregation.

=== Renovations ===
Egyptian Prime Minister Mostafa Madbouly inaugurated the synagogue on 31 August 2023 following a decade-long renovation. The renovation was completed by the Drop of Milk Association that works to preserve Egyptian Jewish heritage. The synagogue's ceiling was reinforced to prevent collapse, the library was heavily restored, and the building was further cleaned and insulated. Given the small population of Egyptian Jews, the renovation was largely done to improve tourism to the synagogue. In December 2023 it was reported that there were tensions between the surviving Jews and the government authority responsible for managing the site.

== Gallery ==
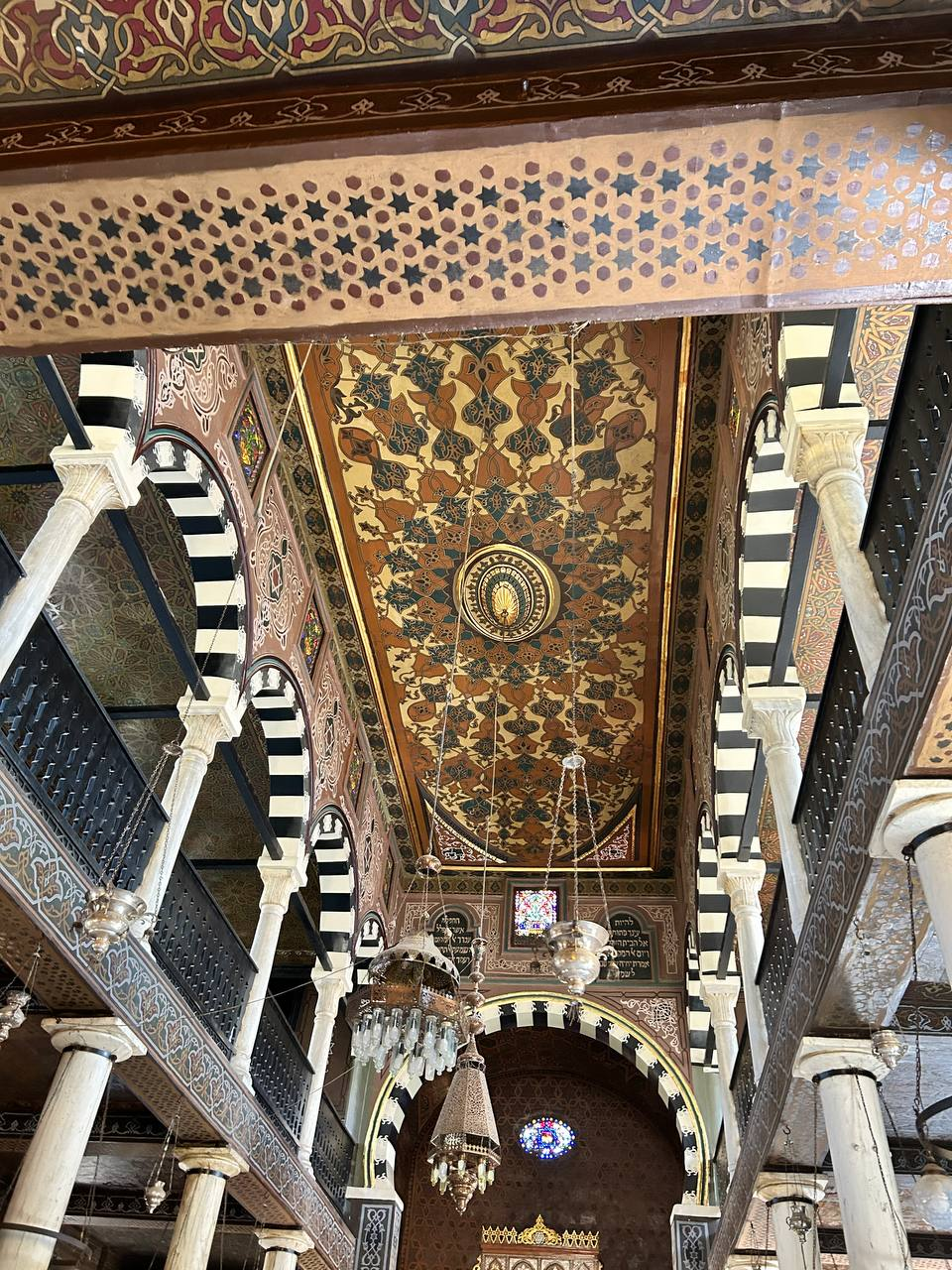
A richly decorated ceiling filled with geometric and floral patterns in warm golden tones. Arched columns in black-and-white stripes frame the hall with elegant rhythm. Hanging lamps add a sacred, timeless atmosphere to the historic synagogue interior.

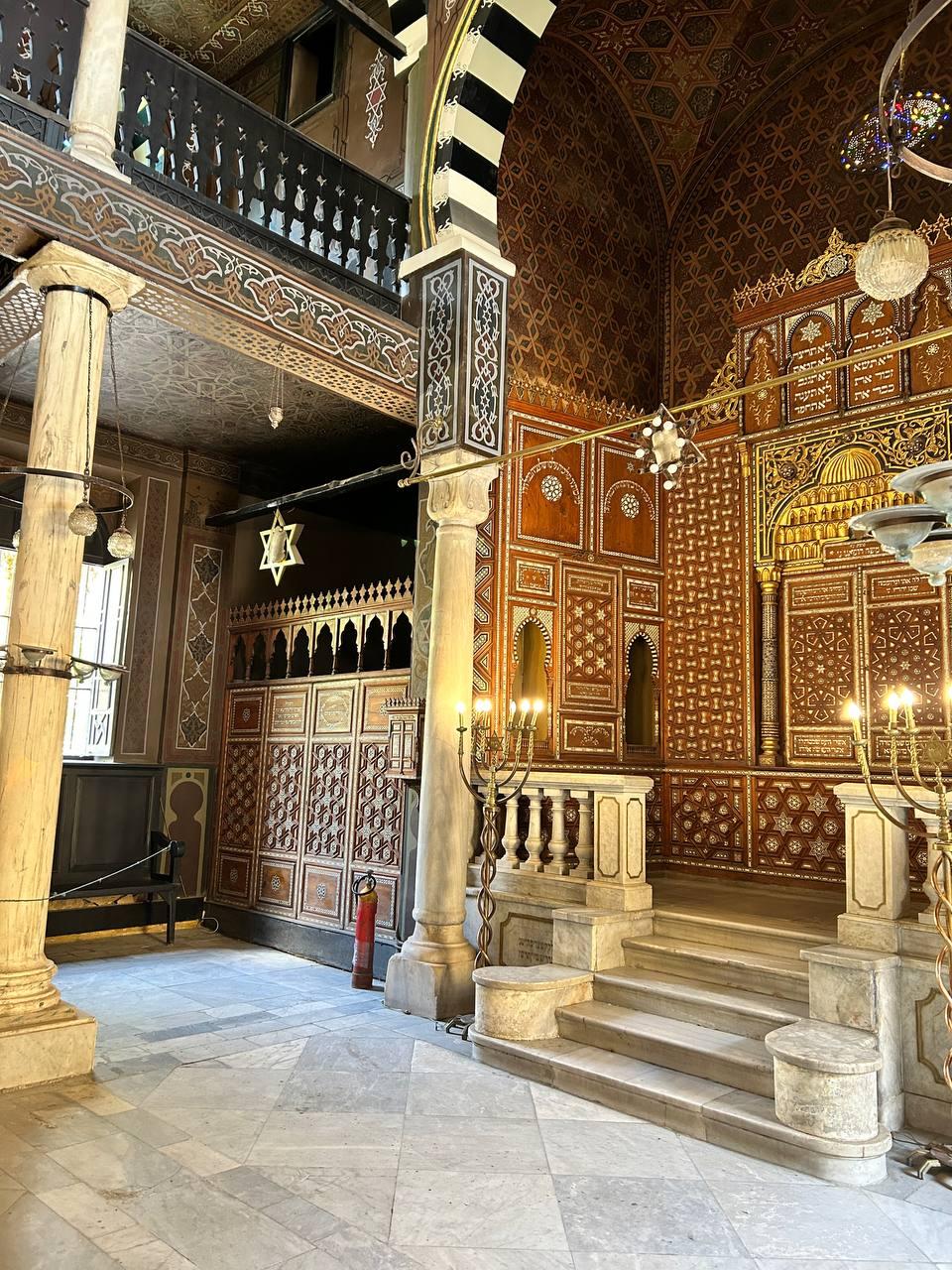
This ornate hall features a ceiling richly decorated with golden geometric and floral patterns. The space is framed by elegant, rhythmically placed arches in bold black-and-white stripes. Hanging lamps illuminate the interior, creating a sacred and timeless atmosphere.

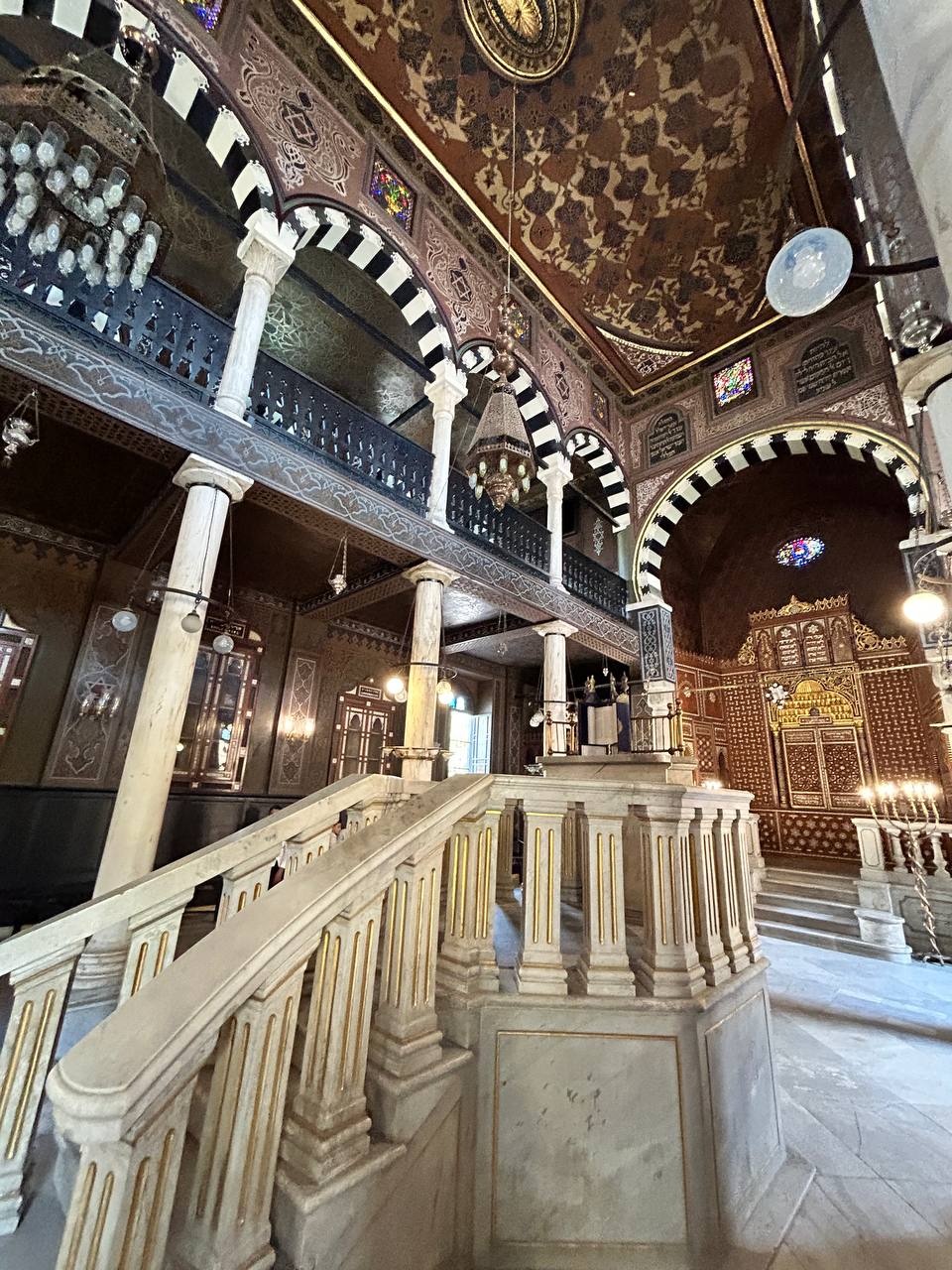
The interior features elegant stone columns and striped arches that reflect a blend of Coptic, Islamic, and Jewish architectural styles. Intricate woodwork and geometric carvings decorate the walls and the elevated bimah area at the center. Soft natural light filters through stained glass windows, creating a warm and reverent atmosphere throughout the hall.

== See also ==
- Cairo Geniza
- History of the Jews in Egypt
- Synagogues in Cairo
- List of synagogues in Egypt
