= Mikhail Murad =

Israeli poet (1906–1986)

Mikhail Murad (Hebrew: מיכאל מראד, Arabic: ميخائيل مراد ; Baghdad, 1906 – February 13, 1986, Tel Aviv) was a Jewish-Iraqi poet, writer, journalist, academic, and pioneer of Jewish-Arab literature in the twentieth century, both in poetry and prose.

== Biography ==
Between 1941 and 1947 Murad served as the principal of the Shammash Jewish high school in Baghdad. Some of his poetry in Arabic was published in the Jewish-Iraqi press, and in 1931 a book of love poems he wrote was also published. His prose also touched on the rights of women and peasants, and criticized superstitions. His "first poem, published in 1922, was an ode of praise and love for Iraq."

After immigrating to Israel in 1949, he was involved in the Arab education and wrote several textbooks.

While in Israel he completed his master's degree at the Hebrew University, and completed his doctoral work in 1965 at Tel Aviv University, which was based on material from the Cairo Geniza.

His overall book of poems was published in 1988, two years after his death.
