= Solomon ben Semah =

Jewish scribe

Solomon ben Semah, also known as Abu Bishr Sulayman ben Semah, was a Jewish scribe who lived in Ramla during the 11th century. He held a position at a talmudical academy. Fragments of his letters to distant Jewish communities were discovered in the Cairo genizah, most of them dealing with public affairs. One of them described the earthquake at Ramla in 1033.
