= Yusuf ibn 'Awkal =

10th- and 11th-century Egyptian Jewish merchant

Abū Ya‘qūb Abu'l-Faraj Yūsuf b. Ya‘qūb b. ‘Awkal
- Born: before 980
- Died: after May 1038
- Other name: Yōsēf ben Ya‘aqōv ben ‘Awkal
- Occupation: Merchant
- Era: Fatimid Caliphate

Abū Ya‘qūb Abu'l-Faraj Yūsuf b. Ya‘qūb b. ‘Awkal was an Egyptian Jewish merchant in the late 10th and early 11th centuries. He was an extremely wealthy "merchant prince" who was a prominent figure in both the Egyptian business community and the Mediterranean Jewish community.

His life and activity are attested by a series of documents from the Cairo Geniza. This consists entirely of letters and reports sent to him; nothing written by him or his secretaries survives. There are a total of 61 documents addressed to him or to family members spanning four generations from the 980s until 1078. The letters to Ibn 'Awkal and his family members together make up the oldest business correspondence in the Cairo Geniza, and one of the oldest in the world. The Ibn 'Awkal correspondence is an important source for commercial life in the Muslim Mediterranean during this period, when the commercial revolution was taking place in the Islamic world but before the Italian city-states came to dominate the Mediterranean by the end of the 11th century.

Socially, Yusuf acted as an intermediary between Maghrebi Jews and the yeshivot (academies) of Iraq and Palestine.

== Name ==
His full name in Arabic was "Abū Ya‘qūb Abu'l-Faraj Yūsuf b. Ya‘qūb b. ‘Awkal". The Hebrew form of his name would be Yōsēf ben Ya‘aqōv ben ‘Awkal. He had two kunyas, which is sometimes the case with particularly high-status individuals. Most correspondence use the kunya Abu'l- Faraj, but in three cases he is referred to as Abū Ya‘qūb, which was "the standard kunya for someone named Yusuf".

== Family ==
Yusuf was born into the Ibn 'Awkal family, who appear to have originally been of Persian origins - one early letter addressed to Yusuf's father is from Iran and in a mix of Arabic and Judeo-Persian - before moving to what is now Tunisia in the mid-10th century and ultimately to Fustat sometime after the Fatimid conquest of Egypt in 969. His father was named Abū Bishr Ya‘qūb; by his time the family was established in Fustat.

The exact year of birth and death for Yusuf are unknown. His latest correspondence is dated to May 1038, and an earlier letter from 1008 was addressed to him and two of his sons who would have been "grown sons who were active partners in the family firm" 30 years earlier; so he must have lived to an old age. By 1038 he must have been at least in his 70s.

Yusuf had four sons: Abu'l-Faḍl Hilāl (Hillel), Abu'l-Ṭayyib Benjamin, Abū Sahl Manasseh, and Abū Sa‘īd Khalaf. He also seems to have had a son-in-law named Abū Naṣr, who Goitein identifies with Abū Naṣr Ḥesed b. Yashar al-Tustarī, a noted member of a prominent Jewish family.

== Residence and offices and daily activities ==
Yusuf kept a home in both Fustat and Cairo. His main office was likely in his family home, as was typically the case. His main office with a reception room (majlis) in downtown Fustat, probably not far from the port given the nature of his business activity. Most of the correspondence addressed to him is addressed to this place. Yusuf had at least two other offices, including one on the Dār al-Jawhar, the main gem trading center of medieval Cairo. Since he was involved selling gems to "a regal clientele", his activity in Cairo was important to put him close to the royal court. Yusuf probably spent several days a week in Fustat since it, and not Cairo proper, was still the main commercial center in the Fatimid Caliphate; most ships came into Fustat's port al-Ṣinā‘a.

Once becoming the head of the family business, Yusuf himself is never documented travelling outside of Cairo-Fustat; he seems to have almost always remained there. His prestige and power were "so great that he almost never needed to leave his home in Fustat." All letters addressed to him or mentioning him assume he is there. During the flax harvest, it was instead his agents who went to the countryside to purchase, process, and pack flax. On the other hand, Yusuf's sons do seem to have travelled.

Yusuf had inherited a position as a representative of the Babylonian academies from his father, but despite his title there is no indication that he actually took part in any scholarship, and "a stream of complaints from both Egypt and the West suggest that he was delinquent or negligent" in those duties. Unlike his contemporaries the Tustaris, Yusuf doesn't seem to have been a courtier or held any offices at the Fatimid court.

== Relationships ==
One of Yusuf's closest associates was Abū Imran Mūsā ibn al-Majjānī, who served as his chief representative in Qayrawan. Musa is mentioned in over a fifth of all correspondence sent to Yusuf, although only one letter from Musa to Yusuf has been identified. Musa had originally been Yusuf's apprentice; they later acted as business partners; finally, sometime in the 1030s, they ended that arrangement. Even after that, Musa still called Yusuf his teacher (mu'allim) in a letter to another friend.

A rivalry between Musa and the powerful Taherti family is evident as early as 1011; in 1015 Yusuf himself cut all ties with them and there were open hostilities between them.

== Business activities ==
Yusuf was primarily an "import-export magnate" who, rather than buying and selling goods directly, oversaw the shipping of goods to associates who then made the actual sale. His commercial activities were evidently restricted to the western Mediterranean; there is no evidence that he was involved in business east of Egypt.

The Ibn 'Awkal family business has similarities with the fraterne that later rose to prominence in the Republic of Venice — both organizations were run entirely as family affairs, but sometimes collaborating with others for short-term joint ventures.

Like many other merchants during this time period, Yusuf handled a wide variety of commodities. For example, the correspondence of a later 11th-century Geniza merchant from Fustat, Nahray b. Nissīm, indicates that the two merchants dealt in mostly the same goods. The difference was quantity. Ibn 'Awkal dealt in a much greater volume of goods than Nahray or other merchants of more modest standing.

=== Employees and associates ===
Yusuf's agents were mostly not actually employees per se, but rather other merchants who worked not for commission but instead because they hoped to receive similar services in return. As Goldberg puts it, "colleagues were happy to act as his agents in return for enjoying access to his connections". However, he also had many apprentices and clerks who did work for him. Yusuf apparently sometimes treated his merchant colleagues as if they were his subordinates, "to their expressed outrage".

These associates provided a variety of services for Yusuf, and in turn they would often request similar services for no cost. These services included receiving and sending off goods, using money from sales to buy more merchandise, transferring money between parties, and "sometimes, laying out money for various purchases or payments". Another service was providing Yusuf with various business information. Lists of various statistics — current market prices, currency exchange rates, demand for various commodities, and departure and arrival schedules for ships — were included in some letters, "much like the financial pages of a modern-day newspaper".

=== Secretaries and communications ===
Yusuf's business "most certainly" employed secretaries or scribes to oversee communications, since many of the letters sent to it were visibly dictated to scribes (often the letter will be in neat handwriting by a trained scribe, and then the merchant adds a postscript in much sloppier handwriting).

The letters addressed to Yusuf all mention the date of sending (day and month, but not usually the year) according to the Jewish calendar, but then once Yusuf's firm received the letters they were marked in Arabic script with the date of receipt according to the Muslim calendar (since this was the fiscal calendar). Since Yusuf is known to have had both Muslim and Jewish agents in various city (and he seems to have communicated with his Muslim agents in Arabic script), he may have also had Muslim secretaries.

=== Commodities exported from Egypt ===
==== Flax ====
Flax (in Arabic: kattān) was the main commodity that Yusuf dealt with. In fact, the flax trade was so prominent that letters sometimes omit the word itself, instead saying simply "bale", "load", or "consignment". Eight different varieties are mentioned in his correspondence, including Ashmūnī, Būṣīrī, Mālāl, Mīsārī, Qimāṭ, and "indigo flax" (i.e. flax dyed with indigo dye after processing but before being woven into linen). Egyptian flax was considered the highest quality available in the medieval Mediterranean world. It was primarily grown in Upper and Middle Egypt. Merchants involved in its sale typically went to buy the raw flax and then oversaw its processing (a very labor-intensive process) and packaging for shipment. Yusuf himself does not appear to have taken part in these activities himself; rather, he had agents and assistants go to the rural centers and do these activities on his behalf.

From Upper and Middle Egypt, bales of flax were shipped down the Nile to Alexandria, sometimes with a layover in Fustat. From Alexandria, the flax was then shipped overseas to Ifriqiya and Sicily, where there were major textile industries. Since the merchant ships heading west usually sailed in convoys that departed in spring or autumn, the flax was often stored in warehouses (called makhāzin in Arabic, which is where the English word "magazine" comes from) until a convoy could be arranged. The main hazard in shipping flax was water damage. This could happen from being packed wet (the flax was soaked during processing in a process known as retting) or, worse, from seawater.

A surviving Geniza document shows that, in one year, Yusuf exported approximately 54 tons of flax to the port of Mahdia. Based on the average price of flax at the time, Norman Stillman estimates that Yusuf's revenue was about 4,860 dinars, or US$486,000 (as of 1973 values) just from this one commodity being shipped to a single port.

The surviving Geniza documents that deal with Yusuf's trade in flax pose some questions. First, the flax was always shipped to either Mahdia or Palermo (once with a layover in Tripoli), and never to any other cities with important textile industries - not even Susa, where Yusuf had relatives living and which was the most important textile-producing city in all of Northwest Africa. It's possible that places like Mahdia or Qayrawan served as the main "depots" where local Tunisian merchants went to buy raw materials. Second, the documents are all from the 1020s and 1030s. It's unclear if this is just coincidince or if it reflects an increase in demand (and therefore, trade) for flax in the Muslim west at this point.

==== Indigo ====
Yusuf's involvement with the indigo dye (in Arabic: nīl) trade is documented over a period of about 50 years. Three different specific varieties of indigo are mentioned in Yusuf's correspondence: 'Amtānī, Kirmānī, and Sandānī. 'Amtani indigo probably came from 'Amta in Palestine. Its price ranged between 20 and 30 dinars per qintar during Yusuf's career. Kirmani indigo, which came from Kerman in southeastern Iran, was much more expensive, with a price as high as 75 dinars per qintar. Sandani indigo probably came from somewhere in India (the geographer Yaqut al-Hamawi wrote that Sandan was a provincial capital somewhere in India). It is only mentioned once in Yusuf's correspondence and no price is given, but other documents from around the same time list its price at 33 dinars per qintar.

==== Sappanwood ====
Sappanwood (Biancaea sappan; called baqqam in Arabic and historically known as brazilwood in English), which is used to produce a vibrant red dye, is one of the most commonly mentioned trade goods in the entire Geniza archives. It came primarily from India and Southeast Asia, especially Sumatra. Yusuf exported large amounts of sappanwood to the Muslim West, and for a sizeable profit: a letter from Samḥūn b. Dāwūd records that he sold sappanwood on Yusuf's behalf for a 300% profit.

==== Lacquer ====
Lacquer (in Arabic: lakk) was one of the most important exports from Egypt to the west during this period. Originally imported from India, it was used as a varnish (shellac), a source of red dye (called lake in English), and for medicinal use. No direct mentions of Yusuf dealing in lacquer are known, but he received quotes on its prices and, according to Norman Stillman, there is "no doubt" that he was involved in exporting it from Egypt to the Maghreb.

==== Pepper ====
Pepper (in Arabic: fulful) was the main spice exported westward from Egypt in this period. Like lacquer, it was originally imported from India. The Malabar Coast region, especially the port of Kollam, was especially associated with pepper. Yusuf was extensively involved in the pepper trade, but the exact amounts and prices are somewhat unclear and "difficult to synthesize".

==== Luxury items ====
Luxury goods (a‘lāq) such as precious metals, gems, and expensive fabrics, were costly but lucrative merchandise. There were also fewer customers buying them. For most merchants, trade in these luxuries was too expensive, and the clientele too restricted, to be a good investment. In a book chapter about personal finance, Abu'l-Fadl al-Dimashqi advised against doing so.

But Yusuf ibn 'Awkal was not most merchants. He was a wealthy merchant prince, and he could afford to specialize in such luxuries. Of these items, the most commonly mentioned in his correspondence is pearls. One letter from Samḥūn b. Dāwūd mentions a particularly profitable sale of pearls he made on Ibn 'Awkal's behalf, making a 125% profit. Relatively few details are available about Ibn 'Awkal's trade in gems, but one letter from his agent Yūsuf b. Ya‘qūb Iṭrābulsī indicates the elite status of some of their customers: Iṭrābulsī mentions displaying various gems to the queen mother of al-Mu'izz ibn Badis, the Zirid sultan of Ifriqiyya; the queen mother ended up buying only a single purse of gems. Another letter from Iṭrābulsī relates that government officials had opened for inspection a shipment including crystal as well as a luxury fabric called Abū Qalamūn, which according to Nasir-i Khosrow was made exclusively in Tinnis and supposedly changed color at different hours of the day. Another item, which Ibn 'Awkal exported to the Maghreb on a large scale, was silver. During his earlier years in charge of the family business, Yusuf conducted very large transactions involving silver with the Taherti family, before Yusuf stopped doing business with them in 1015.

==== Sugar ====
Medieval Egypt was a major producer and exporter of sugar (in Arabic: sukkar), and Egyptian sugar was popular throughout the Muslim world as well as in Europe. Ibn 'Awkal was most likely involved in the sugar trade, since three different agents sent him quotes on sugar prices in the Tunisian market, but no references to actual shipments survive so the extent of his involvement is unknown.

==== Sal ammoniac ====
Sal ammoniac (nushādir) had a variety of uses in medieval chemistry, metallurgy, and medicine. It was mostly imported from China and Central Asia, and while some was reportedly mined from Sicily, all mentions in the Geniza archives refer to the Central Asian variety. It appears several times in the Ibn 'Awkal correspondence, involving both price quotes and shipments.

==== Aromatics and medicines ====
Three major aromatics are mentioned in the Ibn 'Awkal correspondence as export goods: camphor, musk, and odoriferous wood. There are no mentions of shipments of either camphor or musk, but numerous market quotes indicate that Ibn 'Awkal was probably involved in exporting them westward. There is a single reference to odoriferous wood: a letter from Maymūn b. Ephraim, who informs Ibn 'Awkal that he tried to sell the wood in Alexandria but, failing to do so, sent it for export to the Maghreb instead.

Another item, costus, was used as both an aromatic and as a medicine. Other medicinal substances mentioned in the Ibn 'Awkal correspondence include yellow myrobalan, a fruit from India used in the Arab world as a digestive and astringent as well as in the tanning and dyeing industries; sukk, an unidentified substance made from date juice, gallnuts, and "Indian drugs" (‘aqāqīr hindiyya); tragacanth gum, which had various uses including as a laxative, an antacid, an agglutinative; and scammony, which was used as a purgative and vermifuge.

==== Madder ====
The plant Rubia tinctorum, called "madder" in English and fuwwa in Arabic, has roots that can produce a vibrant red dye. It was grown in the same areas as flax and harvested at the same time. Trade in the two commodities went hand in hand, and the two were sometimes even packed in the same bales. However, it's unknown if Yusuf engaged in the madder trade since no documents about his flax shipments mention madder.

=== Commodities imported from the Maghreb ===
==== Metals and coins ====
The west was an important source for metals needed in Egypt. One was copper, which Ibn 'Awkal imported in several forms. One letter mentions a bale of melted-down copper, a basket of copper pellets, and a bundle of beaten copper. Another was lead, which is mentioned in several letters from different agents, but none mention the size of the shipments.

In addition to their use as currency, coins were also bought and sold like any other commodity. They were valued by factors like weight and quality, and the price they fetched was not always the same as their face value. In the Ibn 'Awkal correspondence, they are frequently mentioned as an alternative purchase to other goods. For example, in one letter, Ismā‘īl al-Tahertī asks Ibn 'Awkal to buy him silver dirhams if he can't find good quality 'Amtānī indigo.

==== Olive oil ====
North Africa, Sicily, and Spain were major olive-growing regions, and olive oil (in Arabic, zayt) was one of their main exports. Olive oil appears frequently in the Ibn 'Awkal correspondence, usually as market price quotes. There are also references to shipments of olive oil, sometimes mentioning specific amounts. For example, one letter from the contact Hārūn al-Ghazzāl asks Ibn 'Awkal to receive and sell for him 21 skins of olive oil arriving on the barge of Ben al-Ḥdeb ("son of the hunchback").

==== Soap ====
Soap (ṣābūn) was another major export from the Maghreb. Arab soapmakers had innovated soap made from olive oil instead of smelly animal fats, and Arab soap was a luxury good in contemporary Europe. Arab soap was also often scented. Soap is occasionally mentioned in the Ibn 'Awkal correspondence, such as in another letter from Hārūn al-Ghazzāl mentioning him and Ibn 'Awkal jointly holding some unspecified quantity of soap that was shipped unprofitably.

==== Textiles ====
Along with olive oil, textiles were one of the principal exports from the Maghreb to the east. In particular, Spain and Sicily were major silk producers. During the Fatimid period, silk was used as an investment similar to how securities are used today. Silk played a major role in the Ibn 'Awkal family business — silk shipments or prices are mentioned in 20% of the surviving correspondence. Because silk is delicate, it was shipped inside bales of hides to provide some protection against seawater. Besides regular silk, another variety known was lāsin silk, which was cheaper and came from Sicily. Another fabric Yusuf was involved in trading was fine brocade (dībāj).

==== Wax and honey ====
Wax was another important export from the Muslim West and is mentioned in the Ibn 'Awkal correspondence very frequently. A big part of wax's importance was that, in those days, wax candles were one of the only sources of natural light (the other main one was oil lamps). As a result, wax was relatively expensive. Honey tended to be imported along with wax, but while shipments of honey are mentioned in the Ibn 'Awkal correspondence, no specific quantities are listed. One case, in the late 10th century, apparently involved Ibn 'Awkal receiving from Tunisia multiple shipments of honey in containers not filled up all the way: "...you did not indicate whether they were filled to the brim or, like the last batch, only to the necks."

==== Hides ====
Animal husbandry in the Maghreb produced hides and leathers as byproducts. Several letters in the Ibn 'Awkal correspondence mention shipments of hides. One letter from Mūsā b. Isḥāq b. Ḥisdā mentions a consignment of three bales of hides, which Ibn 'Awkal held a 33% share in, and another consignment of 95 individual hides, of which half were held jointly between Ibn Ḥisdā and Ibn 'Awkal and the other half were held by Ibn 'Awkal alone. In the same letter, Ibn Ḥisdā mentions that he had purchased 700 individual, partially-processed hides, and was transporting them along with another 100.

==== Coral ====
Coral (marjān), gathered off the coasts of Spain and North Africa, was one of the major exports of the Muslim West during this period. Only two references to coral are found in the Ibn 'Awkal correspondence, and both of them are damaged and the specifics are unclear.

==== Saffron ====
There are only two references to saffron (za‘farān) in the entire Ibn 'Awkal correspondence. Both are in letters from Ephraim al-Jawharī, who was Ibn 'Awkal's head agent in Alexandria. In one, al-Jawharī wrote that he had left three baskets of saffron with Ibn 'Awkal and asked him to find a buyer for it who was willing to pay "5 dinars per mann on two months credit". In another, al-Jawharī wrote that he had followed Ibn 'Awkal's instructions to "use the proceeds from the sale of flax at the al-Mahdiyya fair to buy various commodities, among them saffron".

Saffron had a variety of uses: its main use was as a dye, and it was also used in cooking. It was also used as a medicine Because it takes 4,000 flowers to produce a single ounce of saffron, its price was expensive then as well as now.

== See also ==
- Cairo Geniza
