= Cairo Geniza =

Collection of Jewish manuscript fragments

Coordinates: 30°00′21″N 31°13′52″E

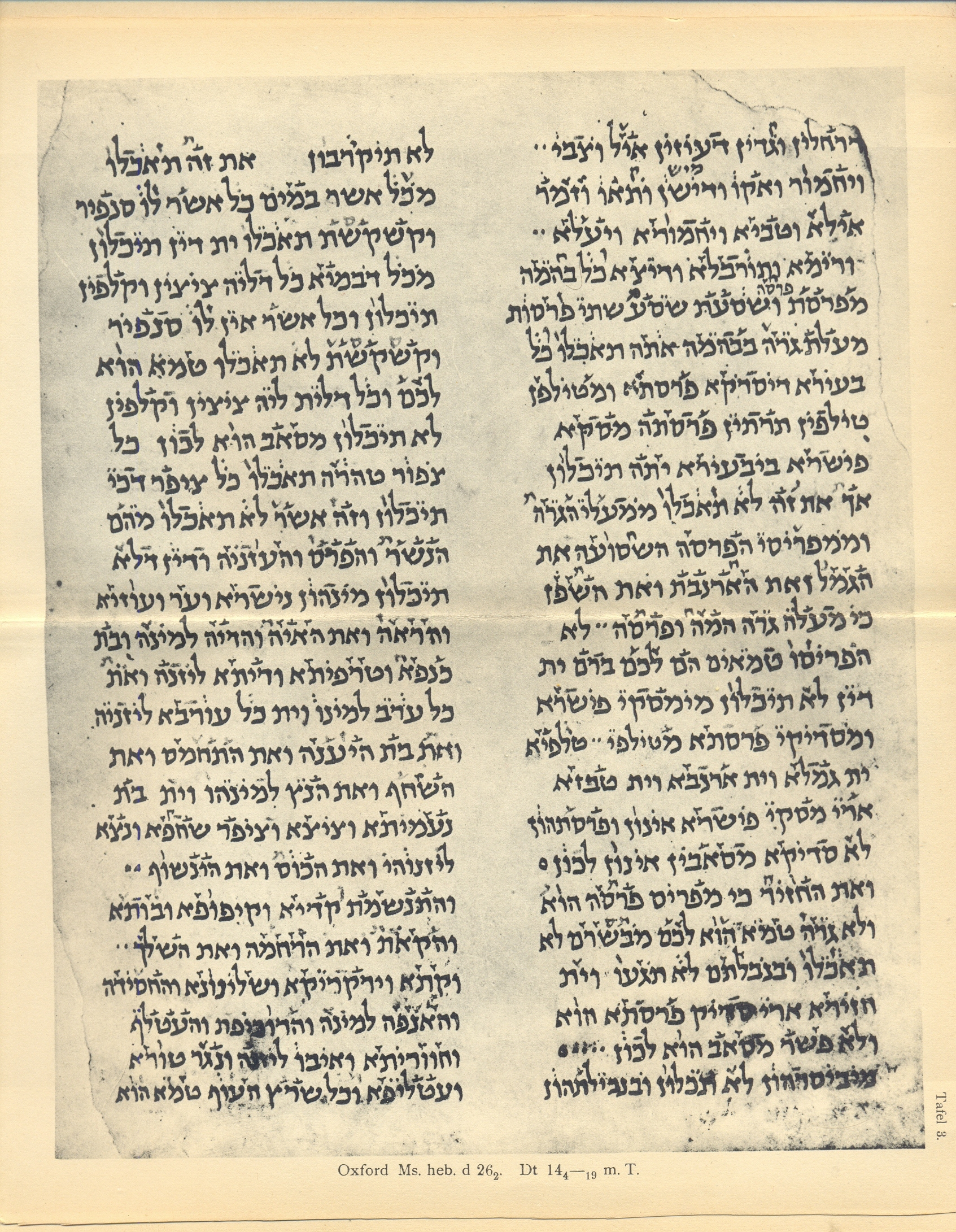
- A document with Babylonian vocalization
- Interactive map of Cairo Geniza
- Location: Cairo, Egypt
- Type: Genizah
- Collection size: Approximately 400,000 fragments
- Period covered: 6th to 19th centuries CE

Building information
- Building: Ben Ezra Synagogue

The Cairo Geniza, alternatively spelled the Cairo Genizah, is a collection of some 400,000 Jewish manuscript fragments and Fatimid administrative documents that were kept in the genizah or storeroom of the Ben Ezra Synagogue in Fustat or Old Cairo, Egypt. These manuscripts span the entire period of Middle-Eastern, North African, and Andalusian Jewish history between the 6th and 19th centuries CE, and comprise the largest and most diverse collection of medieval manuscripts in the world.

The Genizah texts are written in various languages, especially Hebrew, Arabic, and Aramaic, mainly on vellum and paper, but also on papyrus and cloth. In addition to containing Jewish religious texts such as Biblical, Talmudic, and later Rabbinic works (some in the original hands of the authors), the Genizah gives a detailed picture of the economic and cultural life of the Mediterranean region, especially during the 10th to 13th centuries.

Manuscripts from the Cairo Geniza are now dispersed among a number of libraries, including the Cambridge University Library, the Jewish Theological Seminary of America, the John Rylands Library, the Bodleian Library, the University of Pennsylvania's Katz Center for Advanced Judaic Studies, the British Library, the Hungarian Academy of Sciences, the National Library of Russia, Alliance Israélite Universelle, the Younes and Soraya Nazarian Library at the University of Haifa and multiple private collections around the world. Most fragments come from the geniza chamber of the Ben Ezra Synagogue, but additional fragments were found at excavation sites near the synagogue and in the Basatin cemetery east of Old Cairo. Modern Cairo Geniza manuscript collections include some old documents that collectors bought in Egypt in the latter half of the nineteenth century.

== Discovery and present locations ==
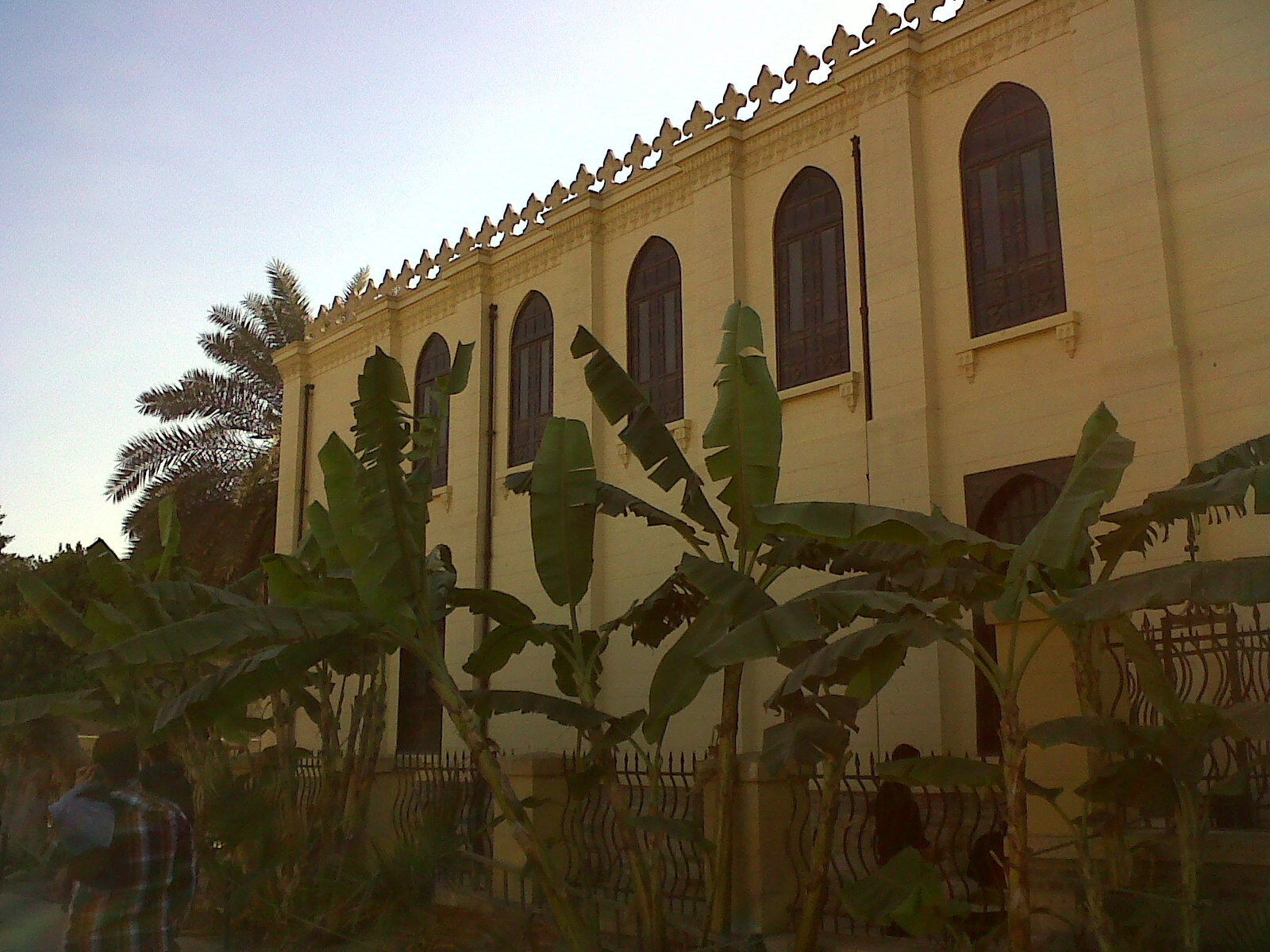
The latest Ben Ezra Synagogue, rebuilt between 1889 and 1892

=== The geniza room ===
In the 1890s, the geniza was a window- and doorless room, only accessible from the Ben Ezra Synagogue galleries by climbing a ladder to an opening up in the wall. Relatively large, it was filled with manuscripts and printed books thrown in through the opening over the centuries, mangled and sometimes glued to each other, covered in dust and infested with insects. By the late 19th century, some papers had been stolen, most likely by the synagogue beadles, and sold as souvenirs to tourists.

=== Discovery ===
The first European to note the collection was apparently Simon van Gelderen (a great-uncle of Heinrich Heine), who visited the Ben Ezra synagogue and reported about the Cairo Genizah in 1752 or 1753. In 1864, the traveler and scholar Jacob Saphir visited the synagogue and explored the Genizah for two days; while he did not identify any specific item of significance he suggested that possibly valuable items might be in store. After a major synagogue renovation, Jewish book collector Elkan Nathan Adler was the first West European to enter the geniza in 1896, when he purchased a sackful of documents, which however failed to impress the researchers back in England.

In 1896, the Scottish scholars and twin sisters Agnes S. Lewis and Margaret D. Gibson returned from Egypt with fragments from the Genizah they considered to be of interest, and showed them to Solomon Schechter, "their irrepressibly curious rabbinical friend" at Cambridge. Schechter, already aware of the Genizah but not of its significance, immediately recognized the importance of the material. With the financial assistance of his Cambridge colleague and friend Charles Taylor, Schechter made an expedition to Egypt, where, with the assistance of the Chief Rabbi, he sorted and removed the greater part of the contents of the Genizah chamber. Agnes and Margaret joined him there en route to Sinai (their fourth visit in five years) and he showed them the chamber which Agnes reported was "simply indescribable".

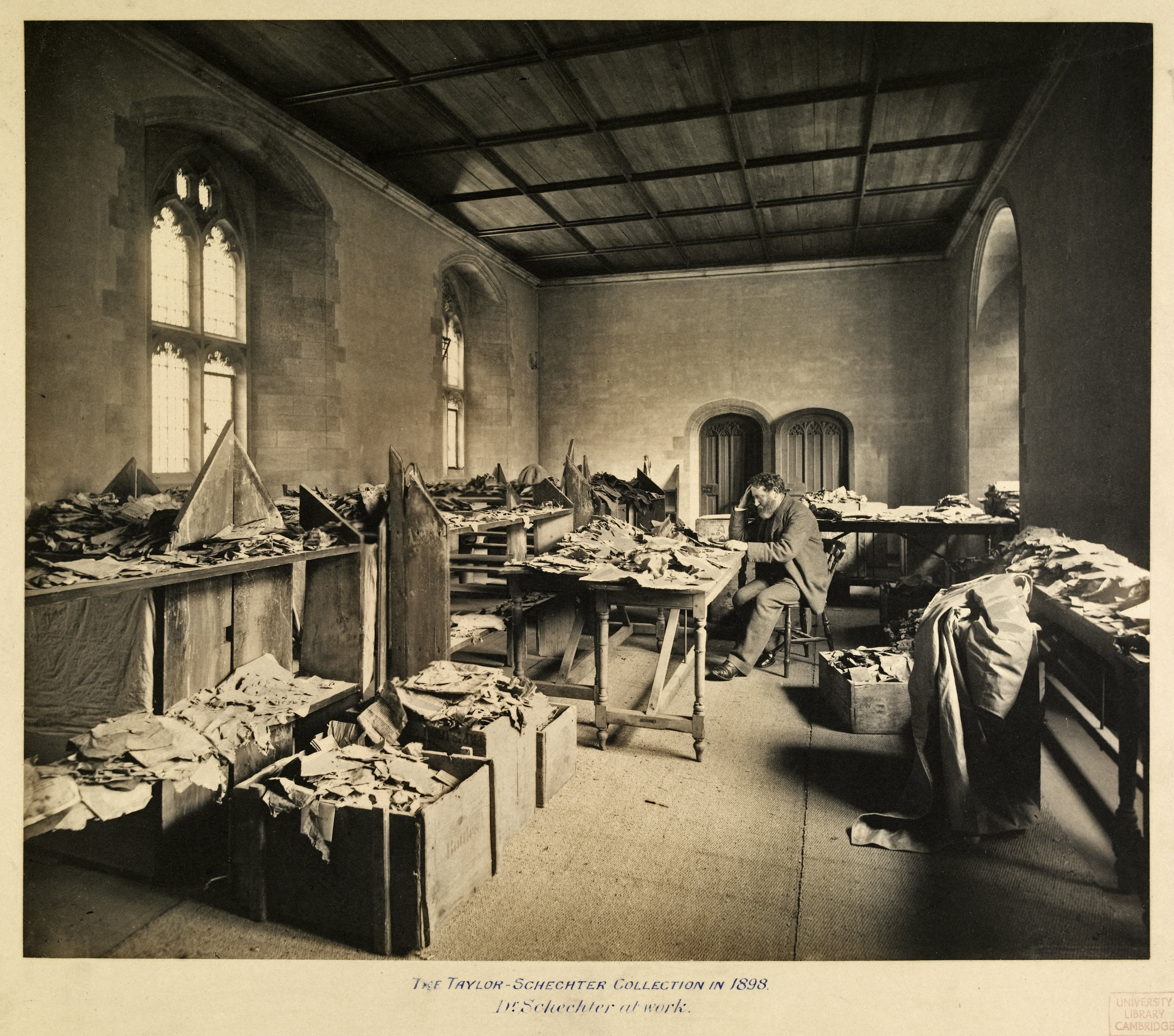
Solomon Schechter at work in Cambridge University Library, studying the fragments of the Cairo Genizah, c. 1898

Egyptologist Count Riamo d'Hulst discovered that Schechter, who had worked alone, had had to limit himself to the already herculean task of going through the material inside the geniza, and had neither fully finished that enterprise, nor had he dealt with the huge volume of written material stored in the open in the synagogue courtyard during the 1889-1892 renovation of the synagogue. That material had in part also originated from the geniza. Count d'Hulst wrote that much of the courtyard was covered one metre high with documents. Much of this material had been left outside after the renovation, and d'Hulst led an almost two months long excavation of the grounds. By May 1898, he was able to send to the Bodleian Library 16 large sacks of documents.

=== Current locations ===
The Genizah fragments have now been archived in various libraries around the world. The Taylor-Schechter collection at Cambridge is the largest, by far, single collection, with nearly 193,000 fragments (137,000 shelf-marks). There are a further 43,000 fragments at the Jewish Theological Seminary Library. The John Rylands University Library in Manchester holds a collection of over 11,000 fragments, which are currently being digitised and uploaded to an online archive. The Bodleian Library at the University of Oxford has a collection of 25,000 Genizah folios.

Westminster College in Cambridge held 1,700 fragments, which were deposited by Lewis and Gibson in 1896. In 2013, the two Oxbridge libraries, the Bodleian Library at Oxford and Cambridge University Library, joined to raise funds to buy the Westminster collection (now renamed the Lewis-Gibson collection) after it was put up for sale for £1.2 million. This is the first time the two libraries have collaborated for such a fundraising effort.

== Contents and significance ==
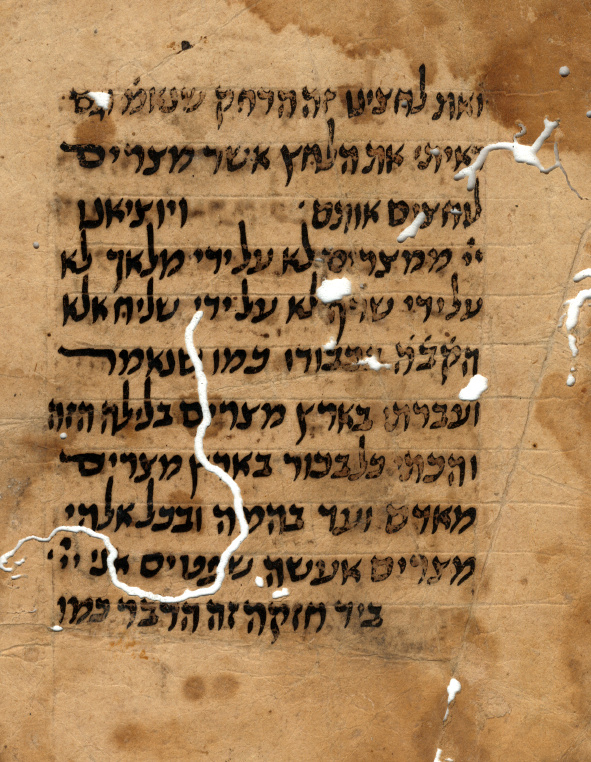
Fragment of a haggada from the Cairo genizah

Many of the fragments found in the Cairo Genizah may be dated to the early centuries of the second millennium CE, and there are a fair number of earlier items as well as a number of nineteenth-century pieces. The manuscripts in the Genizah include sacred and religious materials as well as great deal of secular writings. The Genizah materials include a wide range of content. Among the literary fragments, the most popular categories are liturgical texts, Biblical and related texts, and Rabbinic literature. There are also materials with philosophical, scientific, mystical, and linguistic writings. Among the non-literary items there are legal documents and private letters. Also found were school exercises and merchants' account books, as well as communal records of various sorts.

The normal practice for genizot (pl. of genizah) was to remove the contents periodically and bury them in a cemetery. Many of these documents were written in the Aramaic language using the Hebrew alphabet. As the Jews considered Hebrew to be the language of God, and the Hebrew script to be the literal writing of God, the texts could not be destroyed even long after they had served their purpose. The Jews who wrote the materials in the Genizah were familiar with the culture and language of their contemporary society. The documents are invaluable as evidence for how colloquial Arabic of this period was spoken and understood. They also demonstrate that the Jewish creators of the documents were part of their contemporary society: they practiced the same trades as their Muslim and Christian neighbors, including farming; they bought, sold, and rented properties.

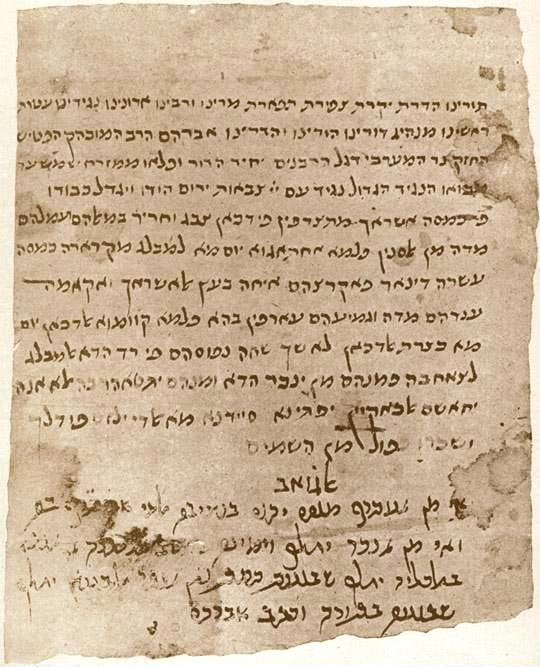
A letter signed by Abraham, the son of Maimonides

The importance of these materials for reconstructing the social and economic history for the period between 950 and 1250 cannot be overemphasized. Judaic scholar Shelomo Dov Goitein created an index for this time period which covers about 35,000 individuals. This included about 350 "prominent people," among them Maimonides and his son Abraham, 200 "better known families", and mentions of 450 professions and 450 goods. He identified material from Egypt, Palestine, Lebanon, Syria (but surprisingly, not Damascus or Aleppo), Tunisia, Sicily, and even covering trade with India. Cities mentioned range from Samarkand in Central Asia to Seville and Sijilmasa, Morocco to the west; from Aden north to Constantinople; Europe not only is represented by the Mediterranean port cities of Narbonne, Marseille, Genoa and Venice, but even Kyiv and Rouen are occasionally mentioned.

In particular, the various records of payments to labourers for building maintenance and the like form by far the largest collection of records of day wages in the Islamic world for the early medieval period, despite difficulties in interpreting the currency units cited and other aspects of the data. They have invariably been cited in discussions of the medieval Islamic economy since the 1930s, when this aspect of the collection was researched, mostly by French scholars.

Many of the items in the Cairo Genizah are not complete manuscripts, but are instead fragments consisting of one or two leaves, many of which are damaged themselves. Similarly, the pages of a single manuscript often became separated. It is not uncommon to find the pages of one manuscript housed in three or four different modern libraries. On the other hand, non-literary writings often lost their value with the passage of time, and were left in the Genizah while still more or less intact.

The materials comprise a vast number of texts, including many parts of Jewish religious writings and even fragments from the Quran. Of particular interest to biblical scholars are several incomplete manuscripts of the original Hebrew version of Sirach. Solomon Schechter also found two fragments of the Damascus Document, other fragments of which were later found among the Dead Sea Scrolls at Qumran.

The Cairo Genizah has preserved over 2,500 fragments related to medicine, including Judeo-Arabic translations of Greek and Arabic medical treatises, original compositions, prescriptions, druggists' notes, and physicians' personal notebooks. These documents provide rare insight into practical aspects of Jewish medicine, covering topics such as eye diseases, skin conditions, oral hygiene, gynecology, and seasonal illnesses. One such fragment includes a version of Jonah ibn Biklārish's Kitāb al-Mustaʿīnī, a drug manual written for the Hūd court in Zaragoza.

The non-literary materials, which include court documents, legal writings, and the correspondence of the local Jewish community (such as the Letter of the Karaite elders of Ascalon), are somewhat smaller, but still impressive: Goitein estimated their size at "about 10,000 items of some length, of which 7,000 are self-contained units large enough to be regarded as documents of historical value. Only half of these are preserved more or less completely."

The number of documents added to the Genizah changed throughout the years. For example, the number of documents added were fewer between 1266 and circa 1500, when most of the Jewish community had moved north to the city of Cairo proper, and saw a rise around 1500 when the local community was increased by refugees from Spain. It was they who brought to Cairo several documents that shed a new light on the history of Khazaria and Kievan Rus', namely, the Khazar Correspondence, the Schechter Letter, and the Kievian Letter. The Genizah remained in use until it was emptied by Western scholars eager for its material.

The oldest copy of the Syriac Apology of Timothy the Patriarch before the Caliph Mahdi is a fragment of an Arabic translation from the Cairo Geniza, dated to about 1100.

Jewish bankers in Old Cairo used a double-entry bookkeeping system which predated any known usage of such a form in Italy, and whose records remain from the 11th century AD, found amongst the Cairo Geniza.

The Cairo Genizah fragments were extensively studied, cataloged and translated by Paul E. Kahle. His book, The Cairo Geniza was published by Blackwell in 1958, with a second edition in 1959.

== Research ==
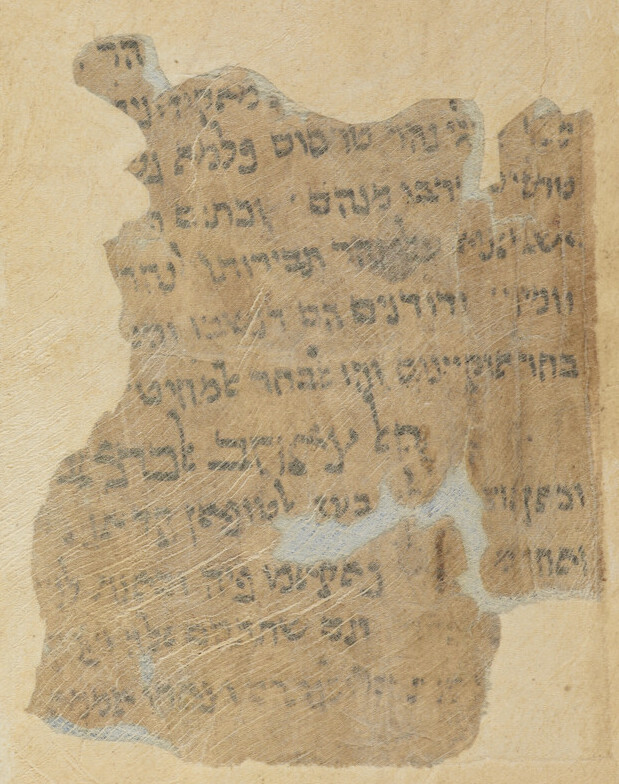
15-16th c. fragment of Josippon in Yemeni Judeo-Arabic from the Cairo Geniza, Cambridge University Library

The Cairo Genizah Collections at the University of Pennsylvania and at the Library of the Jewish Theological Seminary is the subject of a citizen-science project on the website Zooniverse. Project volunteers are enlisted to sort digitized fragments of the Cairo Genizah, in order to facilitate research on the fragments.

The Friedberg Geniza Project is of great importance to research inasmuch as it includes all Genizah fragments and bibliographical data relating to them.

Since 1986, the Princeton Geniza Lab has been studying and digitizing geniza manuscripts. Their projects include the Princeton Geniza Project, a database of more than 30,000 records and 4,600 transcriptions of geniza texts. In early 2021, under the leadership of director Marina Rustow and in partnership with Daniel Stoekl Ben Ezra, the Lab began exploring machine learning as a method of transcribing geniza documents, using handwritten text recognition applications.

== Cultural impact ==
Indian anthropologist and writer Amitav Ghosh recounts his study of the Genizah fragments related to Jewish merchant Abraham Ben Yiju in the book In an Antique Land.

== Other genizot ==
A number of other genizot have provided smaller discoveries across the Old World, notably Italian ones such as that of Perugia. An 11th-century Afghan Geniza was found in 2011.

== Gallery ==
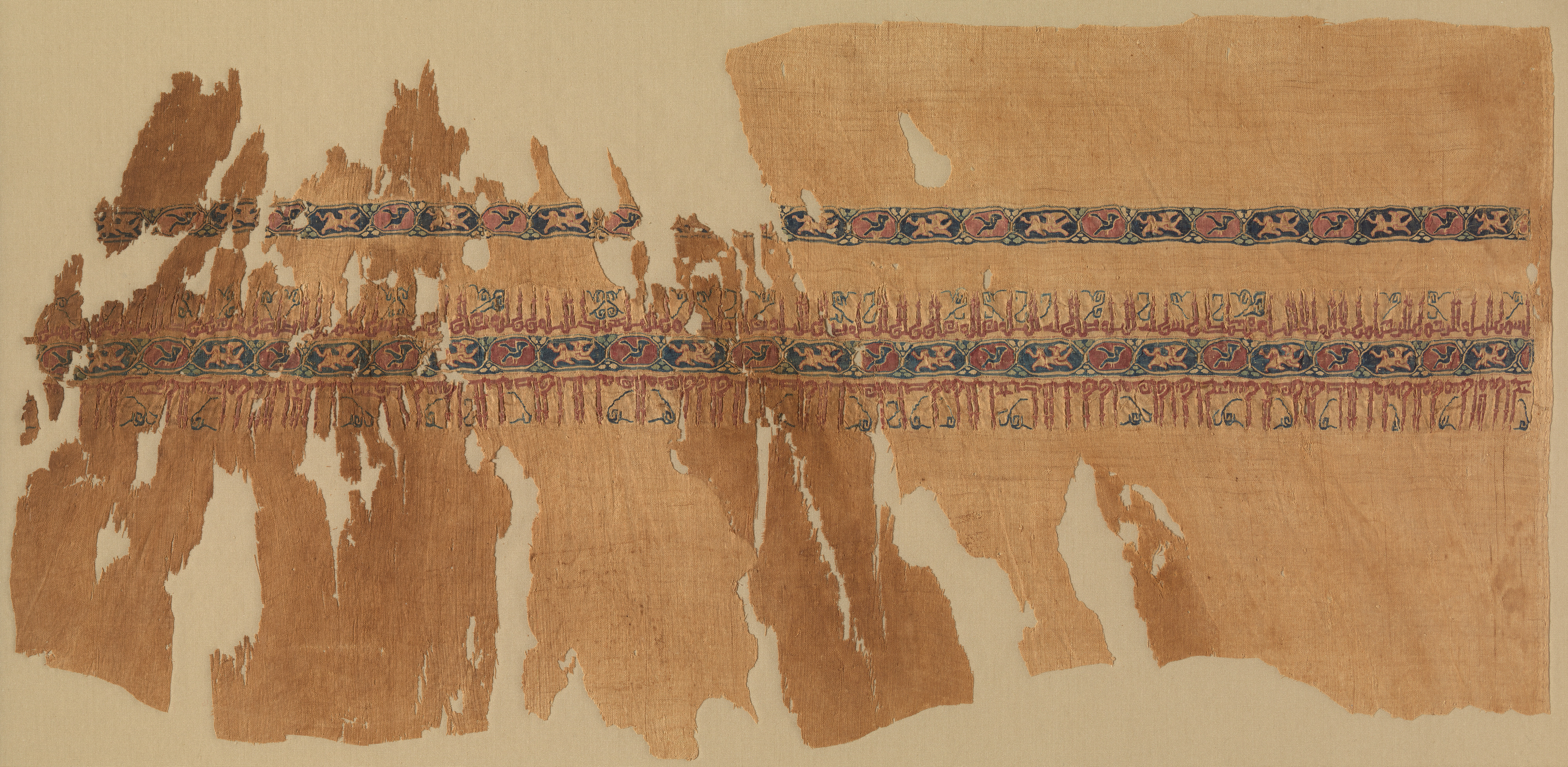

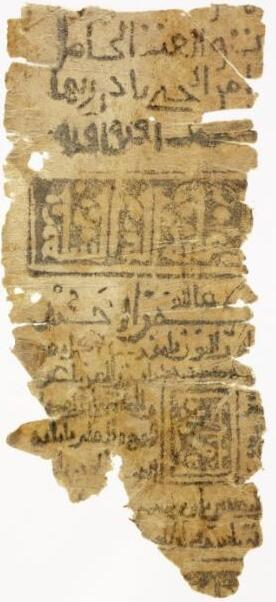

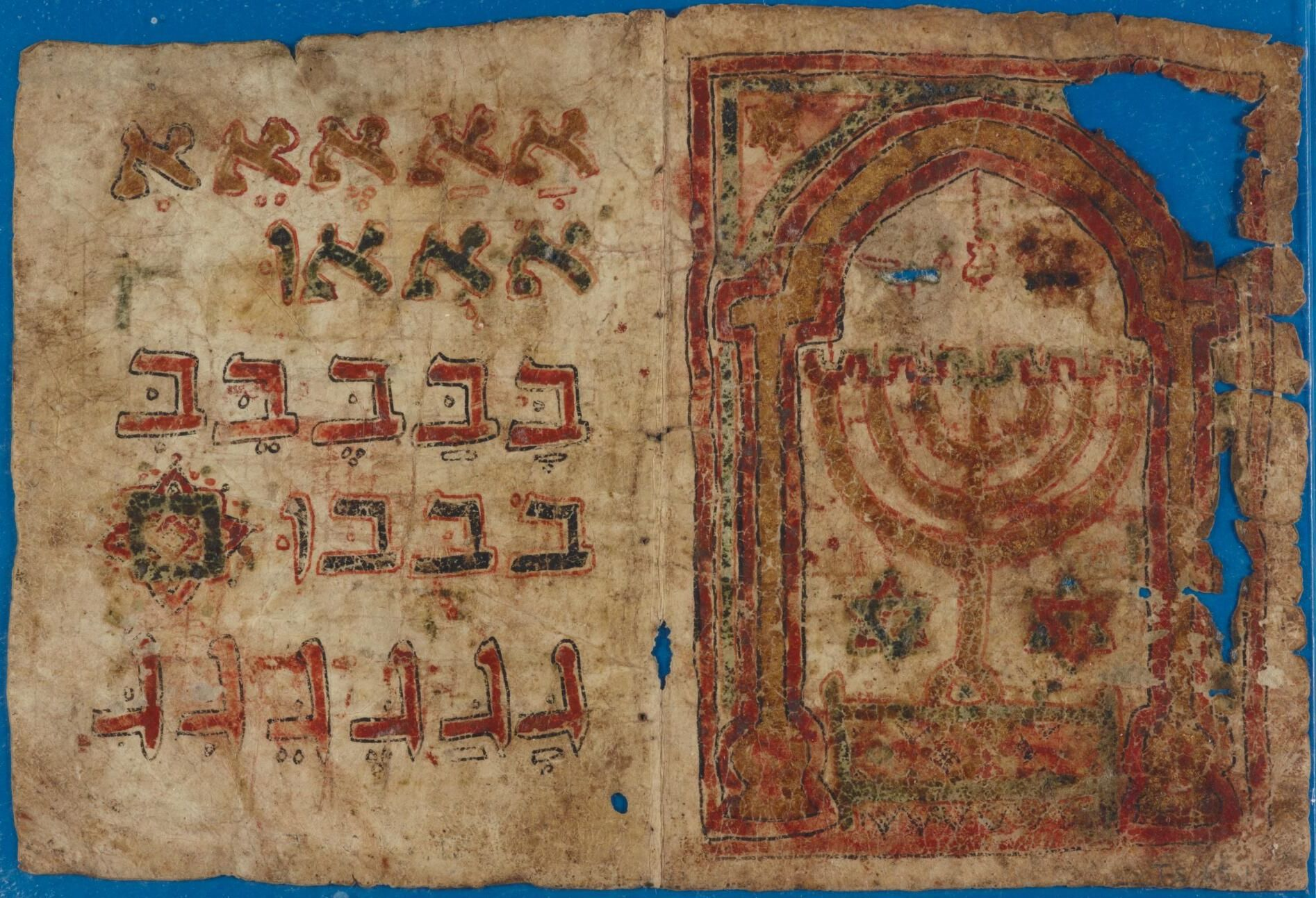

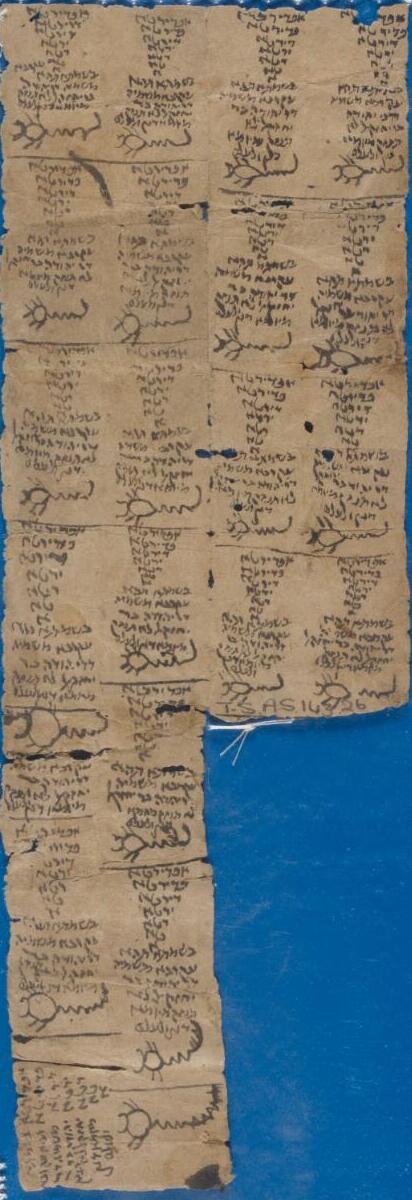

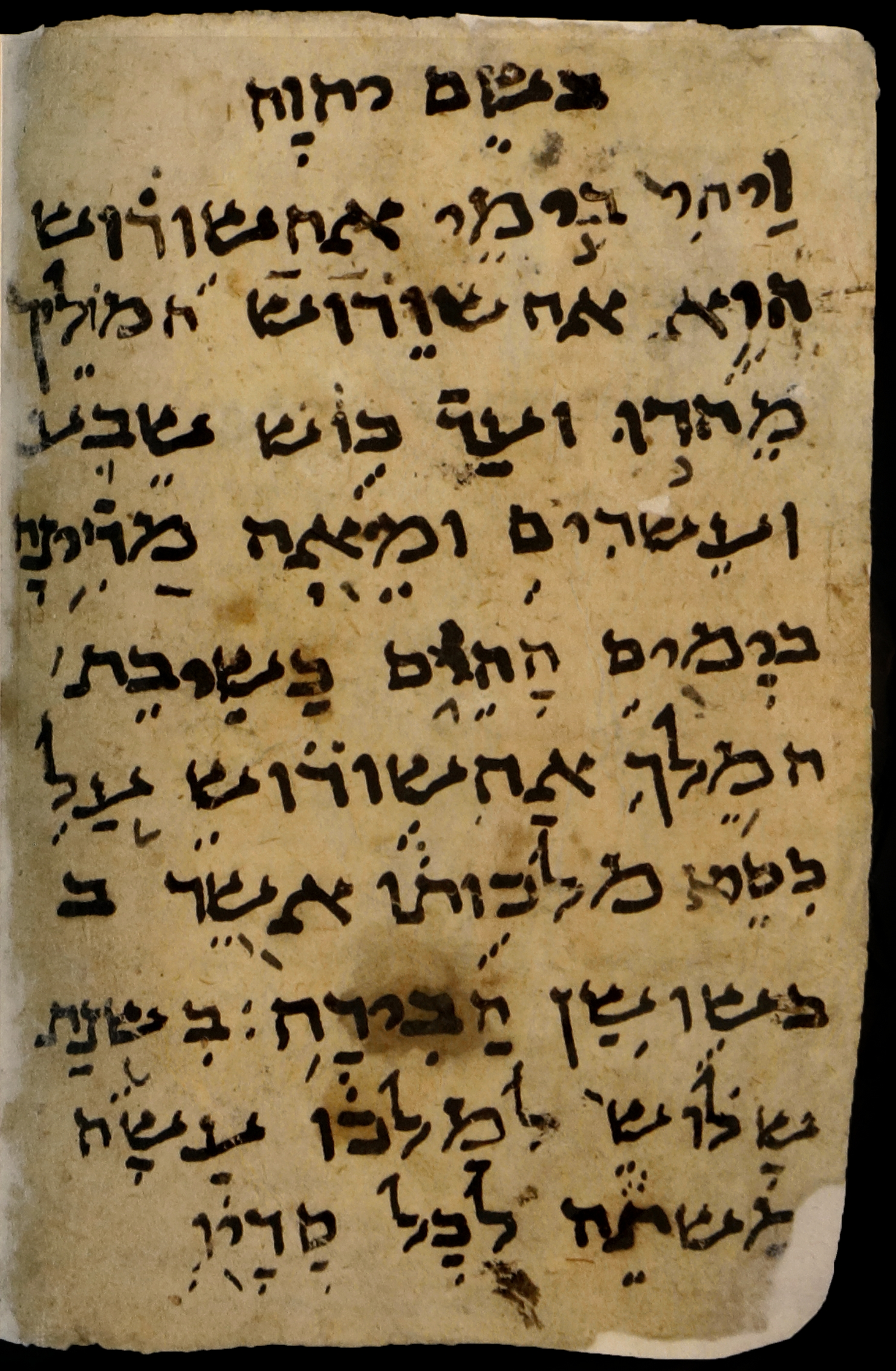

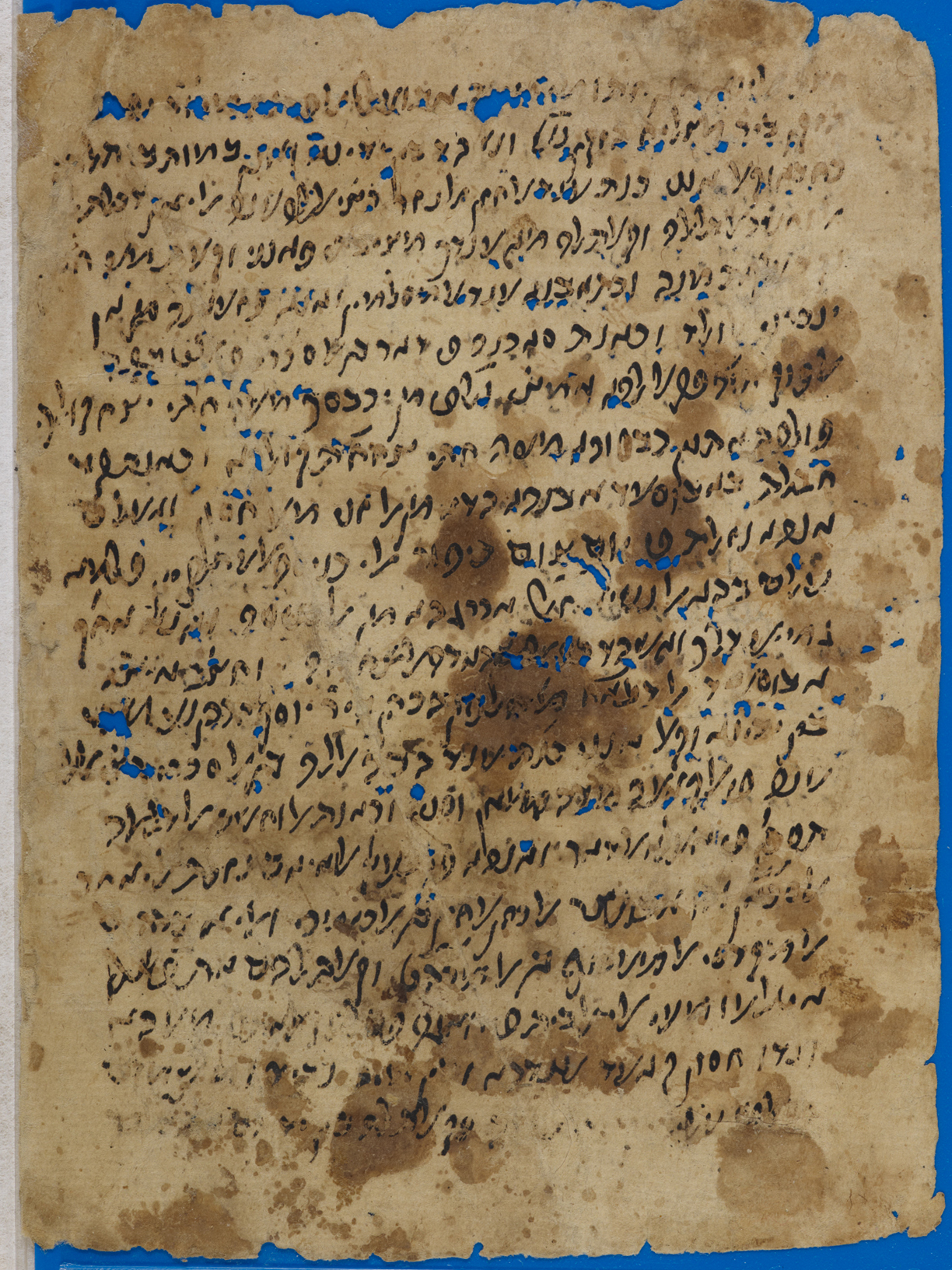

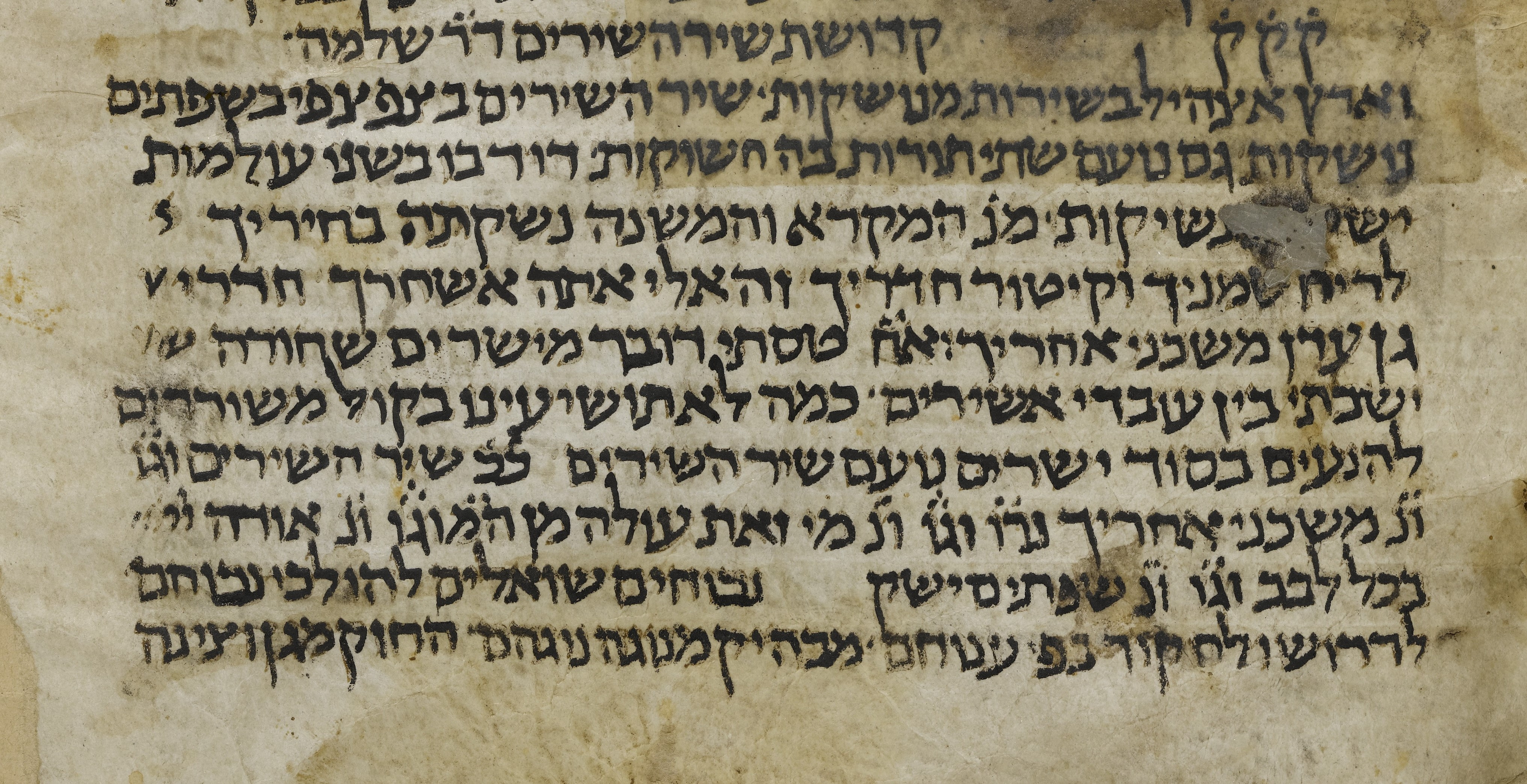

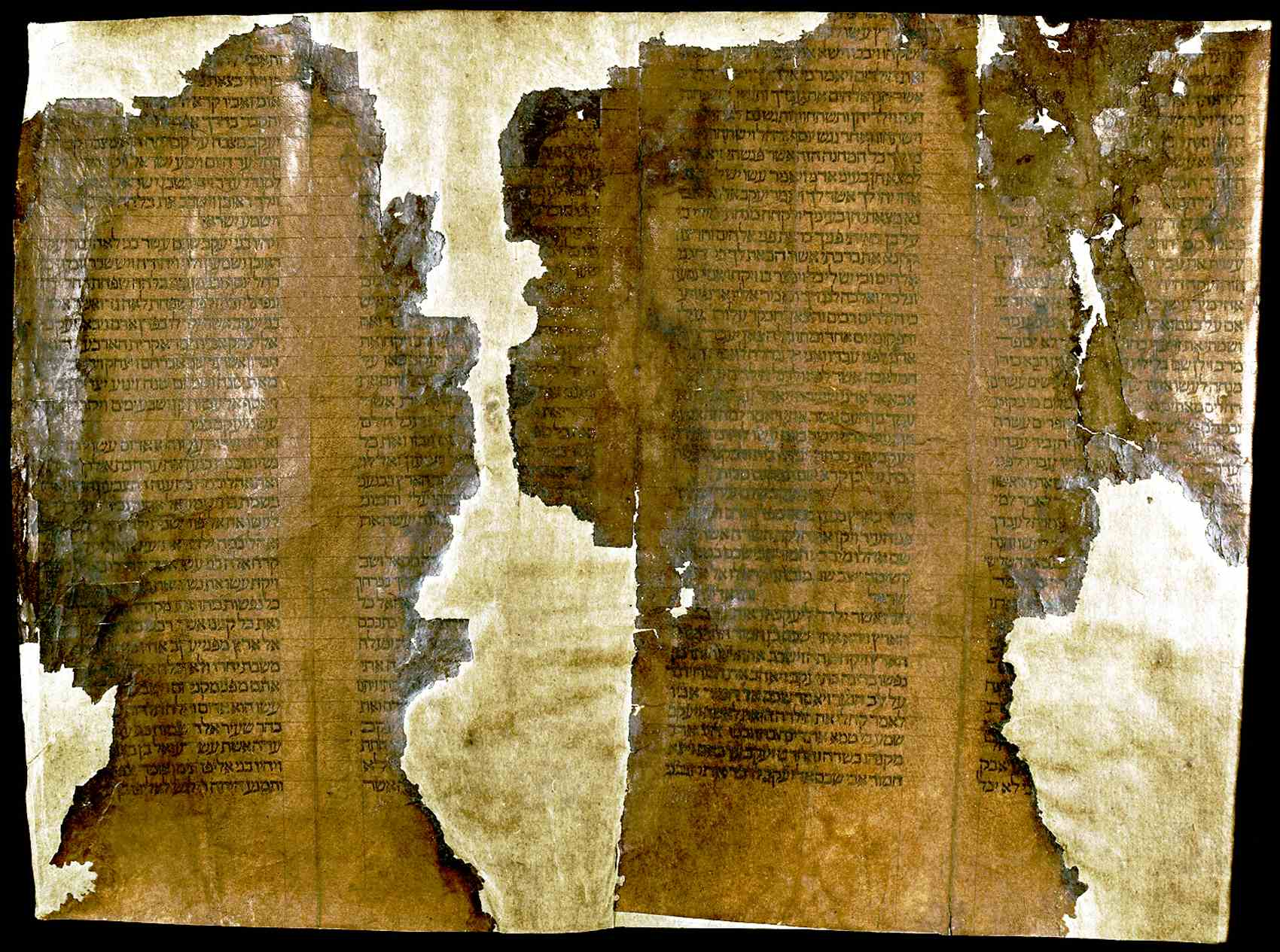

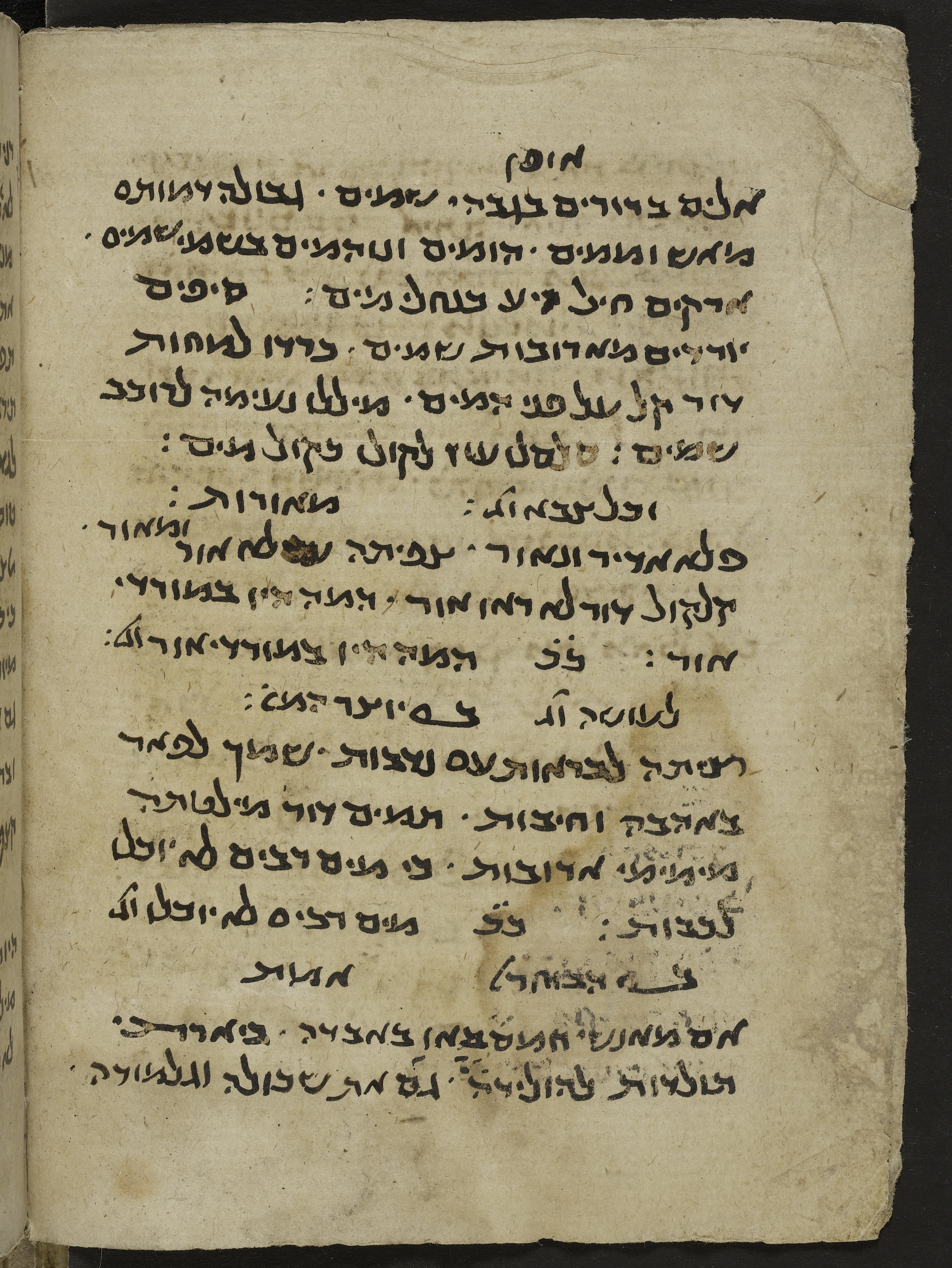

== See also ==
- Afghan Geniza, similar cache of ancient religious and secular documents
- Damascus Document
- Dead Sea Scrolls
- Dunhuang manuscripts, similar cache of ancient religious and secular documents
- Elephantine papyri, similar cache of ancient religious and secular documents
- Herculaneum papyri, similar cache of ancient religious and secular documents
- Timbuktu manuscripts
- Solomon ben Semah
- Yusuf ibn 'Awkal, prominent merchant whose correspondence was found in the Cairo Geniza
- Wuhsha al-dallala, the only woman whose biography could be comprehensively reconstructed from these records
- History of the Jews in Egypt
- Synagogues in Cairo
- European Geniza

== Sources ==
- Burkitt, Francis Crawford (1897). Fragments of the Books of Kings, According to the Translation of Aquila from a MS formerly in the Geniza at Cairo. Cambridge: Cambridge University Press.
- Goitein, Shelomo Dov (1967–1993). A Mediterranean Society: The Jewish Communities of the Arab World as Portrayed in the Documents of the Cairo Geniza. Berkeley: University of California Press. ISBN 0-5202-2158-3.
- Hoffman, Adina; Cole, Peter (2011). Sacred Trash: The Lost and Found World of the Cairo Geniza. New York: Nextbook, Schocken. ISBN 978-0805242584.
- Posegay, Nick (2022). "Searching for the Last Genizah Fragment in Late Ottoman Cairo: A Material Survey of Egyptian Jewish Literary Culture". International Journal of Middle East Studies. 54 (FirstView): 423–441. doi:10.1017/S0020743822000356.
- Rustow, Marina (2020). The Lost Archive Traces of a Caliphate in a Cairo Synagogue. Princeton: Princeton University Press. ISBN 978-0-691-18952-9. OCLC 1132420189.
- Soskice, Janet (2009). The Sisters of Sinai: How Two Lady Adventurers Discovered the Hidden Gospels. New York: Vintage Books. p. 220. ISBN 978-1-4000-3474-1.
- Szilágyi, Krisztina (2006). "Christian Books in Jewish Libraries: Fragments of Christian Arabic Writings from the Cairo Genizah". Ginzei Qedem. 2: 107*–162*.
