= Wuhsha al-dallala =

11th-century Egyptian businesswoman

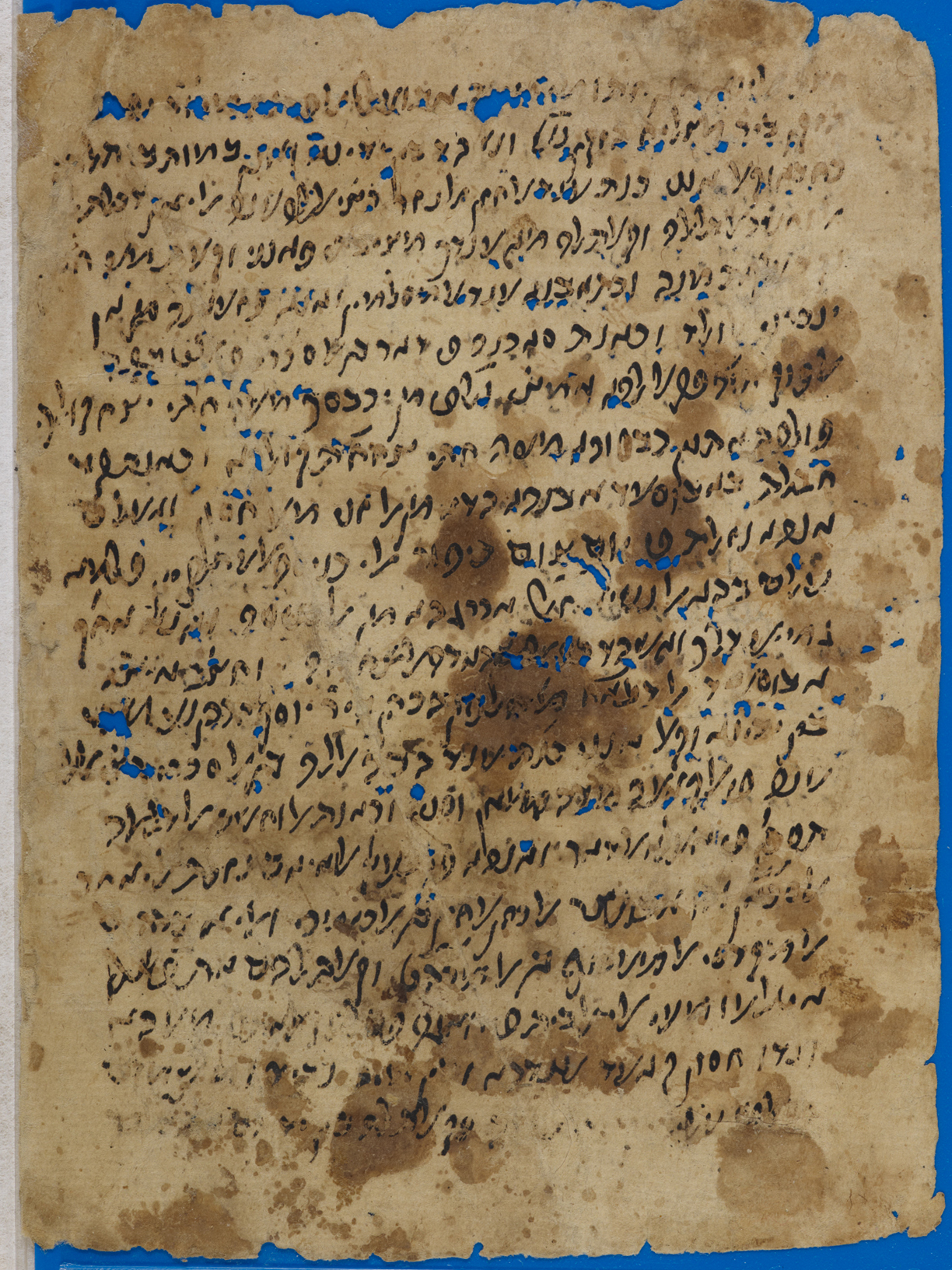
Legal document concerning the illegitimate descendance of Abu Saʽd, son of Wuhsha al-dallala

Karima bint Ammar, better known as Wuhsha al-dallala (fl. 11th century) was a Jewish Egyptian businesswoman and pawnbroker active in Fustat, Egypt. Her existence is attested solely by a series of documents preserved in the Cairo Geniza; she is the only woman whose biography could be comprehensively reconstructed from these records.

Wuhsha belonged to a banking family of moderate wealth. She was briefly married to Arye ben Judah, a destitute Sicilian immigrant, resulting in the birth of a daughter. Choosing not to remarry after her divorce, Wuhsha later formed a relationship with Hassun of Ashkelon, with whom she had a son, Abu Saʽd. The illegitimate birth of Abu Saʽd prompted Wuhsha's expulsion from her synagogue during Yom Kippur. She was not completely ostracised however, and maintained her career, amassing a fortune of at least 700 dinars.

Her will, penned by her confidant, the cantor and clerk Hillel ben Eli, provides the most insight into her life, outlining her funeral arrangements in detail, from her burial attire to payments for pallbearers, alongside generous charitable bequests and the distribution of her estate among her son and relatives. Long after her death, court documents continued to identify individuals as "al-Wuhsha's relative." Her expressions of independence and defiance of societal norms, uncharacteristic for the time, have established her as exemplary of female individuality in the Cairo Geniza.

== Name and sources ==
The life of Wuhsha al-dallala is documented solely through the Cairo Geniza, a vast collection of Jewish-Egyptian manuscripts spanning the 11th to 19th centuries and written in Hebrew, Judeo-Arabic, and Aramaic. Five primary documents revolve around her life and she appears minutely in other texts, making her the only woman from the Geniza whose biography can be substantially reconstructed. Her existence was first noted by the historian and ethnographer Shelomo Dov Goitein in 1964, through a document that reproached her absence in the court despite a summons. Goitein later identified her will, drafted by the cantor and clerk Hillel ben Eli.

A record of the rabbinical court in Old Cairo from 1097/8, gives her full name as "Karima bint Ammar, known as Wuhsha al-dallala". The honorific Wuhsha al-dallala derives from the Arabic root wḥš and can be vocalised in two ways: wuḥsha and waḥsha. Goitein interpreted wuḥsha as a term of endearment, translating it as "one without whom one feels lonely" or "object of yearning". Mordechai Friedman, scholar of Jewish history, suggested that waḥsha could denote "loneliness", "estrangement", "coldness" or "untamed", favouring the latter as most likely. The title al-dallala signifies her profession as a pawnbroker.

== Reconstructed biography ==
=== Personal relations ===
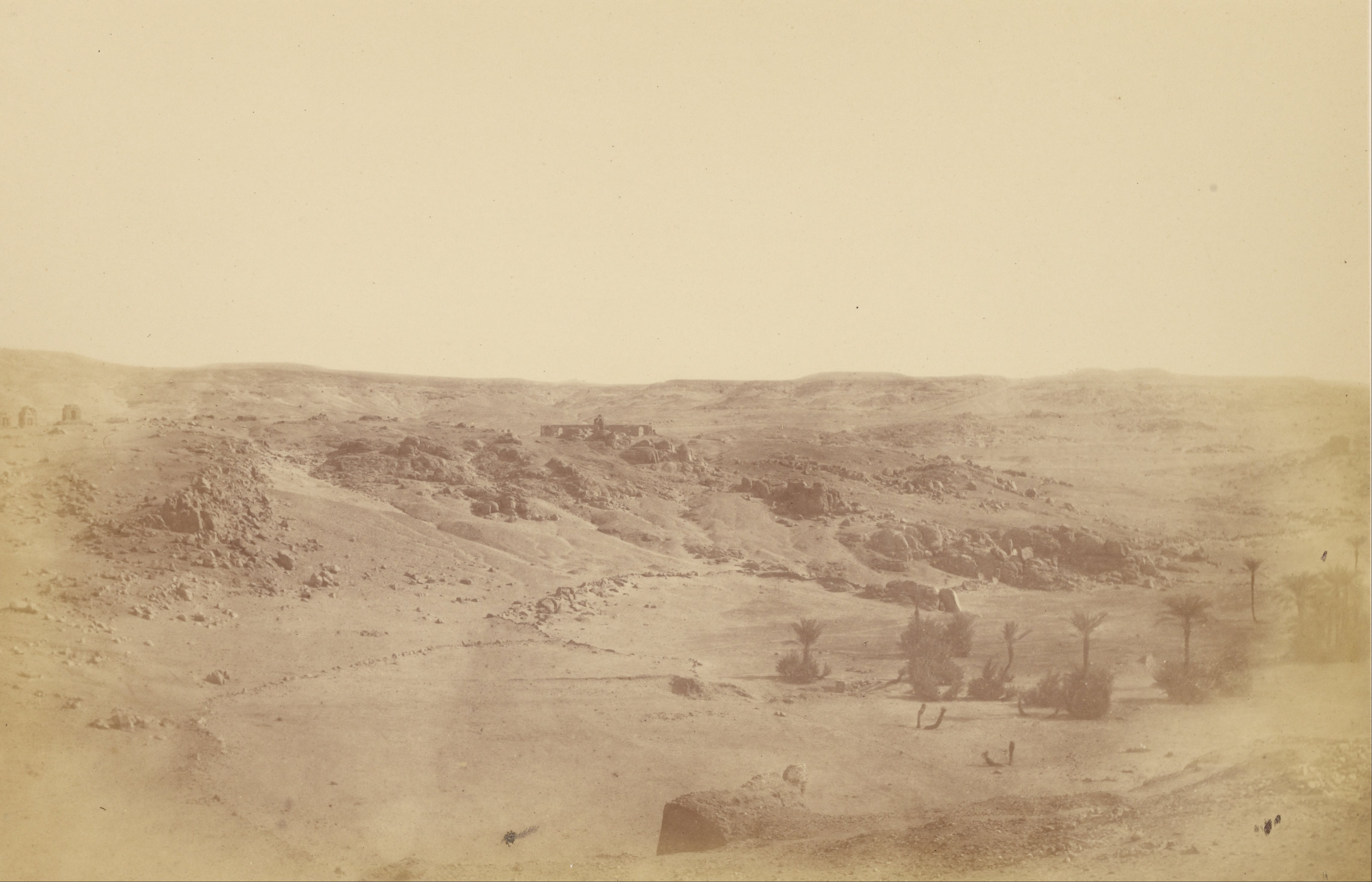
Overview of the ruins of Fustat in 1865, some thirty years before Solomon Schechter's discovery of the Geniza site. Photograph taken by Théodule Devéria, a French Egyptologist.

In a record of charity contributors, Wuhsha is listed immediately before Ammar, the son of Rosh ha-Qahal (Head of the Congregation), who is later identified in a 1093 document as Amram, son of Ezra, the Rosh ha-Qahal. (Note: Amram was the Hebrew equivalent of the Arabic Ammar. The title of his father, by the time of their era, bore no more than an honorary status. According to Goitein, the rank of Rosh ha-Qahal was originally a successor to the ancient Rosh ha-Knesset (head of the synagogue) and it designated a leader of the congregation; during the Geniza period, the title lost its authority and functionality to Chaver and Muqaddam and consequently became devoid of administrative power.) Amram, likely her father, was a prominent banker in Alexandria. He had five children, three daughters and two sons and the family lived in Fustat—a previous capital of Egypt before the founding of Cairo—where they were seen as outsiders and foreigners. He was recorded as deceased by June 1104.

The earliest documentation of Wuhsha al-dallala in the Cairo Geniza is her marriage contract with Arye ben Judah, a destitute Sicilian immigrant. The document lists her dowry at 316 dinars, a figure Goitein deemed inflated upon reviewing the listed items, estimating a more accurate value of 150 dinars. (Note: Dinar was the Muslim gold coin struck under the standard weight of 4.233 grams. During the Geniza era, a monthly income of 2 dinars was sufficient for a lower middle class family. Goitein cautiously equated one dinar with US$100 in 1967 (equivalent to $966 in 2025). Doubling a bride's dowry was a widespread custom in many parts of the Islamic world, serving to enhance the family's prestige. In the Geniza documents, most marriage documents included the Hebrew phrase "2 dinars are worth 1", which helped distinguish the inflated number from the actual amount.) Goitein concludes that Wuhsha's family maintained a comfortable yet modest financial standing, considering the fact that they were responsible for providing for three daughters. Arye himself only offered a marriage gift of 10 dinars, and another 15 dinars promised in deferred payments. The date of the marriage is unknown, but the historian Renée Levine Melammed suggests it occurred after Wuhsha's family relocated to Fustat. Though the rationale for this union is unclear, Goitein hypothesised that exceptional circumstances, possibly Wuhsha's reputation for independence, may have influenced the arrangement.

The marriage was short-lived and, within a few years, Wuhsha is described in another document as Arye's divorcée. The historians Miriam Frenkel, Delia Cortese, and Simonetta Calderini date the official end of the marriage to January 1095. Goitein considered the date to relate to a second failed marriage of Arye. From Arye, Wuhsha had a daughter named Sitt Ghazal (Lady Gazelle), whose name is absent from Wuhsha's will. Sitt Ghazal appears in a document dated December 1132, which records her acquisition of half a house. She is identified by the presiding judge as "Bint al-Wuhsha" (daughter of Wuhsha), the name by which she was commonly known.

After separating from Arye, Wuhsha did not remarry. A short time after her divorce, she gave birth to a son, Abu Saʽd, whose father was her lover, Hassun, a refugee of Ashkelon. Contemporary records do not mention Hassun's name, and the birth of Abu Saʽd was described as irregular. As a result of this, the president of the Iraqi synagogue, David ben Daniel ben Azariah, (Note: A former nasi (head) of the Jews in the Fatimid empire until his downfall in April/May 1094, thenceforth assuming the presidency of the Iraqi synagogue. During the 11th century, two different groups of Rabbanite Jews had their sects in Foustat: the Iraqis (i.e., Babylonians) and the Palestinians (i.e., Jerusalemites). The former were allied and received guidance from the Geonim of Babylonia while the latter held the Geonim of the Land of Israel as their spiritual guides.) publicly humiliated Wuhshah by expelling her from the synagogue during Yom Kippur.

Concerned that her son Abu Saʽd might be regarded as a mamzer, (Note: Mamzer is a Jewish legal category that describes children born of a forbidden relationship: either incest or their mother's adultery. They are prevented from contracting a lawful Jewish marriage, and sometimes excluded from the Jewish community. Though sometimes compared to the European concept of illegitimacy, a child merely born out of wedlock is not a mamzer.) Wuhsha arranged circumstances that enabled witnesses to confirm his paternity. Wuhsha's ruse is described in a Jewish court document, conducted after her death and pertaining to an adult Abu Saʽd's efforts to affirm he was not a mamzer. According to the testimony of a third-party parnas, (Note: A Hebrew term denoting 'leadership status'. In the Arabic and Mediterranean context, a parnas was a lay leader of the community working alongside the rabbis. In the Cairo Geniza documents, parnas is the most recurrent title pertaining communal officials.) he was in the company of Hillel ben Eli, a trusted confidant of Wuhsha, when Wuhsha approached them and disclosed her pregnancy with Hassun's child. She further confided that, although she and Hassun had formalised their union before a Muslim notary, she was afraid that Hassun might deny paternity. (Note: According to Goitein, Hassun was married to a wife in Ashkelon. The Jewish court in Fustat, prohibited him from taking a second wife without the explicit consent of his first wife, who, it is reasonable to infer, withheld such permission. Consequently, Hassun was unable to conduct a Jewish marriage with Wuhsha. He furthermore rejected the notion of an Islamic marriage between Wuhsha and Hassun, arguing that Wuhsha lied to Hillel to preserve her dignity. Had they been married in accordance to the sharia, Hassun would have been entitled to an automatic share of her inheritance upon her death, since under the Islamic law a legal heir cannot be disinherited, whereas Wuhsha's will explicitly prohibited Hassun from receiving any portion of her estate.) Hillel counselled her to orchestrate a scenario in which witnesses could verify her relationship with Hassun, advising her to "gather some people, and let them surprise you with him so that your assertion might be confirmed". Therefore she had two neighbours surprise Hassun while in intimate proximity with her, thus confirming that her future child was conceived from him. Some of the concerns around Abu Saʽd's status appear to have followed him into adulthood, as Wuhsha invested a lot of money into his education in an attempt to get him accepted by the Jewish community.

Many documents survive wherein individuals are referred in relation to Wuhsha, some pertaining to court cases long after her death. For instance, in July 1150, a woman identified as "the daughter of the daughter of al-Wuhsha" arranged for repairs to her residence in Cairo. A list of prospective donors includes "the carpenter, the son of al-Wuhsha". Documents from 1133 and 1148 feature individuals known as "al-Wuhsha's relative" and "al-Wuhsha's sister's son".

=== Business endeavours ===
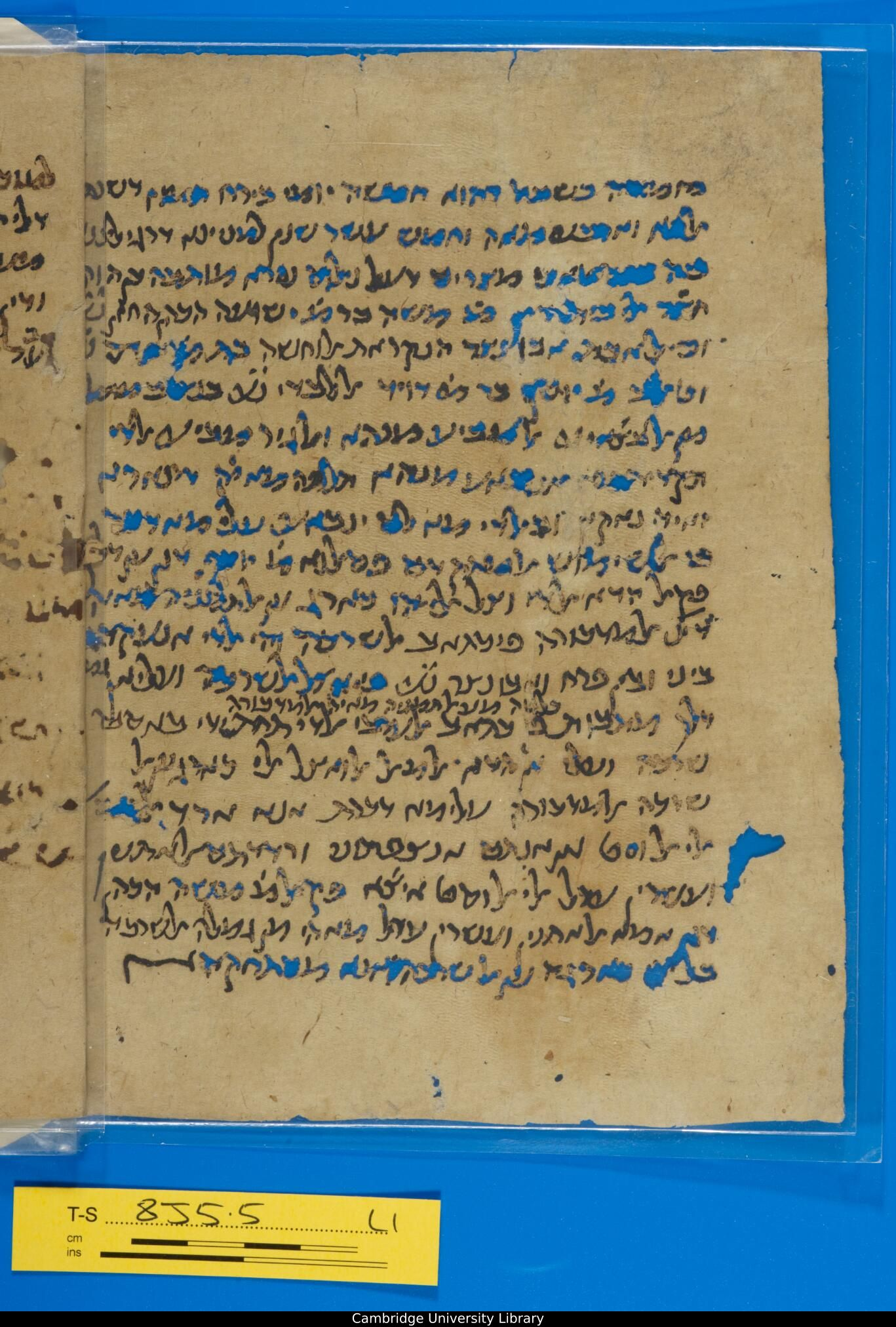
A court proceeding record for the case of Wuhsha al-dallala versus Joseph al-Lebdi

Wuhsha's will indicates that she possessed a minimum of 700 dinars. She participated in significant commercial enterprises, collaborating with her brother, Abu Nasr, (Note: An Arabic kunya (honorific designation) meaning "victor". His real name may have been Joseph, and Goitein suspects this because a Joseph is reported dead in Wuhsha's will, in which Wuhsha dedicates 5 dinars to his widowed wife as an act of charity.) a trader active in India, and other merchants, both male and female. Her primary economic pursuit was pawnbroking, providing loans against collateral. Her professional success notably increased following her divorce from Arye. According to Goitein, Wuhsha's affluent wealth was remarkable for her time, as most female pawnbrokers in her era were impoverished.

In the summer of 1101, Abu Nasr was murdered at the port of ʽAydhab while returning from a trading venture in India, undertaken in collaboration with two other merchants, Farah—who was also killed—and Joseph al-Lebdi, a trader from Tripoli. Subsequently, Wuhsha and Lebdi came to a dispute over the fate of Abu Nasr's investment in Lebdi's goods and the matter was the subject of a legal proceeding in Fustat, dated 30 June 1104. Represented by Moshe ben Yeshua, Wuhsha demanded a share of 300 dinars from the goods already sold, itself part of a total investment valued at 800 dinars initially made by Abu Nasr. Lebdi argued that the 300 dinars were unrelated to the partnership but expressed willingness to account for them if Wuhsha would similarly include 22 bales of lac, which her representative asserted were part of a distinct transaction and not the partnership involving 800 dinars.

Neither party could substantiate their claims with evidence. The case was overseen by two jurisconsults, known as the Judge and the Rayyis (headman), who held conflicting views, the Judge favouring Lebdi and the Rayyis supporting Wuhsha. Initially, the Judge ruled in Lebdi's favour, prompting criticism from the Rayyis. This disagreement escalated into a protracted judicial dispute marked by continuous rebuttals and critiques which engaged the Fustat court for several years.

=== Wuhsha's will ===
According to Goitien, Wuhsha's will stands out as the most detailed source of information regarding her circumstances. Drafted in Arabic by Hillel ben Eli at the close of the eleventh century and, according to Frenkel, shortly after Abu Saʽd's birth, the will meticulously outlines the distribution of her substantial assets. These included 300 dinars in gold and kept by her at home, 67 on deposit, and the rest in loan collaterals. Wuhsha allocated significant sums for charitable purposes, including twenty-five dinars for the cemetery, twenty-five dinars for synagogue maintenance (specifically for oil used in lighting), twenty dinars for the impoverished of Fustat, and two dinars to an orphan girl in Cairo whom she stated was related to her family, though she could not recall her name. Among these donations was a sum designated for the same synagogue that expelled her on Yom Kippur—perhaps a sign of having the final say, as it is unlikely that her donation would have been rejected. The lavish donations were intended as acts of atonement; the exorbitant expenses of the funeral (five times the usual amount for a middle class person in the era) were a demonstration of Wuhsha's display of prominence and virtue to other members of the community in view of her social image. Wuhsha also carefully specified her funeral arrangements, designating funds for each element of her burial attire—comprising a shroud, cloak, cap, hood, kerchief, veil, cover, and coffin—as well as compensation for the pallbearers.

For Abu Saʽd, Wuhsha left her estate along with provisions for his religious education. She appointed an acquaintance specialised in the Hebrew Bible to reside in her estate and instruct Abu Saʽd in the Bible and prayer book, but she also set a limit to the extent of his tuition to prevent her son from "becoming a scholar", as suggested by Goitein.

Among her siblings, Wuhsha allocated 100 dinars to her surviving brother, 50 dinars to her sister, Sibah, and 10 others to another sister. (Note: The latter sister may have been of another mother or had already received a substantial amount for her dowry. Meanwhile, Sibah received only money and no items.) Goitein suggests this distribution reflects the influence of the surrounding Muslim culture, where a female's inheritance was typically half that of a male. On the other hand, they may have received a lesser amount because Wuhsha had previously provided for both sisters' bridal attire. Furthermore, Wuhsha provided luxurious gifts for her relatives, including "the bed on which I lie but not the carpets" granted to her cousin. Yet, she excluded her daughter, Sitt Ghazal, from the will, possibly due to estrangement following Ghazal's marriage, which led to her disinheritance. Finally, she wrote of Hassun: "not one penny should be given", but she cancelled his considerable debt of 80 dinars to her, returning two promissory notes to him along with a gift of 10 dinars.

The extensive will concludes with a statement that three documents in Arabic, outlining al-Wuhsha's assets, liabilities, and the corresponding actions to be taken, were dictated and authorised by her.

== Legacy ==
According to Goitein, Wuhsha's life stands out as a notable example of female individuality within the Cairo Geniza documents. Despite her flourishing career as a pawnbroker and merchant, Wuhsha remained an outsider in the community's social fabric. As a foreigner in Fustat, Wuhsha associated herself with foreigners in her personal relations and deliberately operated outside the societal ethical norms; for instance, her conscious choice to remain unmarried after her divorce and engaging in an affair that resulted in an heir. She was also assertive in delegating herself as her brother's heir upon his death, challenging the Jewish inheritance law that granted exclusive rights to her surviving brother as the inheritor.

Melammed describes the community's perception of Wuhsha as complex; although she faced expulsion from the synagogue, this did not equate to full excommunication or social ostracism. She sustained meaningful connections with influential synagogue members, and used these relationships for support. On the other hand, the birth of a son out of wedlock implies that Wuhsha's surrounding society was relatively mindful of a child's legal paternity, contrary to the rulings of the Medieval Rabbinite law (which approached fornication with a relaxed treatment, even stating that a child of such union should not bear any stigma).

== Family tree ==
Ezra the Rosh ha-Qahal
Amram
Abu Nasr (Joseph?)	Arye ben Judah	Karima, Wuhsha al-dallala	Hassun of Ashkelon	Son	Sibah (Note: Alternative readings include Sabah ("Morning") or Subah ("Beauty"))	Daughter
Sitt Ghazal	Abu Saʽd

== Bibliography ==
- Ayalon, Yaron (2014). "Parnasim". In Stillman, Norman (ed.). Encyclopedia of Jews in the Islamic World Online. Leiden: Brill. doi:10.1163/1878-9781_ejiw_SIM_000616. ISBN 9789004176782. ISSN 1878-9781. OCLC 650852958.
- Baskin, Judith R. (2018). "Independent Jewish Women in Medieval Egypt: Enterprise and Ambiguity". In Francesconi, Federica; Mirvis, Stanley; Smollett, Brian (eds.). From Catalonia to the Caribbean: The Sephardic Orbit from Medieval to Modern Times. Leiden: Brill. pp. 81–99. ISBN 9789004376717. OCLC 1042824266.
- Burns, Robert I. (2021) [1999]. Jews in the Notarial Culture: Latinate Wills in Mediterranean Spain, 1250–1350. Berkeley: University of California Press. ISBN 9780520324404. OCLC 1476687154.
- Cortese, Delia; Calderini, Simonetta (2006). Women and the Fatimids in the World of Islam. Edinburgh: Edinburgh University Press. doi:10.3366/edinburgh/9780748617326.001.0001. ISBN 9780748617326. OCLC 1306539746.
- Cohen, Mark R. (2005). Poverty and Charity in the Jewish Community of Medieval Egypt. Princeton: Princeton University Press. doi:10.1515/9781400826780. ISBN 9781400826780. OCLC 1241813305.
- Cohen, Zina (2020). Composition Analysis of Writing Materials in Cairo Genizah Documents. Cambridge Genizah Studies Series. Vol. 15. Leiden: Brill. doi:10.1163/9789004469358_003. ISBN 978-90-04-46935-8. JSTOR 10.1163.
- Elon, Menachem (2007). "Mamzer". In Skolnik, Fred; Berenbaum, Michael (eds.). Encyclopaedia Judaica. Vol. 13 (2 ed.). Detroit: Thomas Gale. pp. 442–445. ISBN 9780028659411.
- Frenkel, Miriam (2009). "Charity in Jewish Society of the Medieval Mediterranean World". In Frenkel, Miriam; Lev, Yaacov (eds.). Charity and Giving in Monotheistic Religions. Berlin: De Guyter. pp. 343–365. doi:10.1515/9783110216837. ISBN 9783110216837. OCLC 460057490.
- Frenkel, Miriam (2010). "al-Wuḥsha". In Stillman, Norman (ed.). Encyclopedia of Jews in the Islamic World Online. Leiden: Brill. doi:10.1163/1878-9781_ejiw_SIM_000616. ISBN 9789004176782. ISSN 1878-9781. OCLC 650852958.
- Frenkel, Miriam, ed. (2021). The Jews in Medieval Egypt. Brookline: Academic Studies Press. ISBN 9781618117489. OCLC 1192304364.
  - Cohen, Mark R. (2021a). "Communal Self-Government: The Genizah Period". In Frenkel (2021), pp. 72–86.
  - Frenkel, Miriam (2021a). "Jewish Family Life in Medieval Egypt". In Frenkel (2021), pp. 146–175.
- Goitein, Shelomo Dov (1967). "A Jewish Business Woman of the Eleventh Century". The Jewish Quarterly Review. 57. United States: The University of Pennsylvania Press: 225–242. doi:10.2307/1453495. ISSN 0021-6682. JSTOR 1453495. OCLC 5547919750.
- Goitein, Shelomo Dov (1999a) [1979]. A Mediterranean Society: the Jewish Communities of the Arab World as Portrayed in the Documents of the Cairo Geniza. Vol. III, The Family. Berkeley: University of California Press. ISBN 9780520221604. OCLC 490932663.
- Goitein, Shelomo Dov (1999b) [1979]. A Mediterranean Society: the Jewish Communities of the Arab World as Portrayed in the Documents of the Cairo Geniza. Vol. V, The Individual. Berkeley: University of California Press. ISBN 9780520221628. OCLC 496169328.
- Goitein, Shelomo Dov (1999c) [1967]. A Mediterranean Society: the Jewish Communities of the Arab World as Portrayed in the Documents of the Cairo Geniza. Vol. 1, Economic Foundations. Berkeley: University of California Press. ISBN 9780520221581. OCLC 491299181.
- Goitein, Shelomo Dov; Friedman, Mordechai (2008). India Traders of the Middle Ages. Études sur le judaïsme médiéval. Vol. 31. Leiden: Brill. ISBN 9789004154728. OCLC 496681344.
- Krakowski, Eve (2019). Coming of Age in Medieval Egypt : Female Adolescence, Jewish Law, and Ordinary Culture. Princeton: Princeton University Press. doi:10.1515/9781400887842. ISBN 9780691191638. OCLC 1051134168.
- Melammed, Renée Levine (2007). "Wuhsha al-dallala". In Skolnik, Fred; Berenbaum, Michael (eds.). Encyclopaedia Judaica. Vol. 21 (2 ed.). Detroit: Thomas Gale. p. 249. ISBN 9780028659497. OCLC 70174939.
- Outhwaite, Ben (2020). "The Sefer Torah and Jewish Orthodoxy in the Islamic Middle Ages". In Anderson, Bradford A. (ed.). From Scrolls to Scrolling: Sacred Texts, Materiality, and Dynamic Media Cultures. Berlin: De Guyter. pp. 63–91. doi:10.1515/9783110634440-005. ISBN 9783110629590.
- Melammed, Renée Levine (2015). "A Look at Women's Lives in Cairo Geniza Society". In Schapkow, Carsten; Shepkaru, Shmuel; Levenson, Alan T. (eds.). The Festschrift Darkhei Noam: the Jews of Arab lands. Brill's Series in Jewish Studies. Vol. 55. Leiden: Brill. pp. 64–85. ISBN 9789004304765. OCLC 923808611.
- Melammed, Renée Levine (2009). "Women in Medieval Jewish Societies". In Greenspahn, Frederick E. (ed.). Women and Judaism: New Insights and Scholarship. New York: NYU Press. pp. 91–115. doi:10.18574/nyu/9780814732182.001.0001. ISBN 9789004304765. OCLC 967267383.
- Reif, Stefan; Frenkel, Miriam; Polliack, Meira; Outhwaite, Ben; Wagner, Esther-Miriam (2010). "Cairo Geniza". In Stillman, Norman (ed.). Encyclopedia of Jews in the Islamic World Online. Leiden: Brill. doi:10.1163/1878-9781_ejiw_COM_0004800. ISBN 9789004176782. ISSN 1878-9781. OCLC 650852958.
- Taitz, Emily; Henry, Sondra; Tallan, Cherryl (2003). The JPS Guide to Jewish Women, 600 B.C.E.to 1900 C.E. Philadelphia: The Jewish Publication Society. ISBN 9780827607521. OCLC 317242945.
- Zinger, Oded (2023). "Between the Muslim State and Individual Agency: The Regulation of Sexuality in the Jewish Communities of Medieval Egypt". In Skoda, Hannah (ed.). A Companion to Crime and Deviance in the Middle Ages. Amsterdam: Arc Humanities Press. pp. 376–396. doi:10.1515/9781802701098. ISBN 9781802701098. OCLC 1396907127.
