= Count Riamo d'Hulst =

Egyptologist and antiquarian (c.1850–1916)

Count Riamo d'Hulst (c.1850–1916) was an Egyptologist and antiquarian of possible German origin.

== Biography ==
Details about his early life are unknown. According to one report, d'Hulst may have been a Prussian officer in the Franco-Prussian War of 1870–71, and a possible deserter. Another account relates that he was the victim of a war wound. The same document, however, falsely describes him as an Austrian.

The first reference of D'Hulst is found in the London Times (1887), where it was reported that he discovered an early Christian cemetery in Alexandria. More information about d'Hulst comes to light during the years 1887 to 1892 when he worked as an officer of the Egypt Exploration Fund, most notably on the excavations at Tel Basta (Bubastis) with the Swiss Egyptologist and biblical scholar, Henri Édouard Naville.

D'Hulst helped the Fund to ship large monuments to museums in England and Europe. A speaker of Arabic, he was also placed in charge of superintending the Arab workmen.

== See also ==
- Archibald Henry Sayce
- Cairo Geniza and Genizah

== Publications ==
- D'Hulst, R., 'The Arab House of Egypt', Royal Institute of British Architects, new ser. 6 (1890), 221-7.
- Naville, E., Bubastis (1887-1889), Eighth memoir of the Egypt Exploration Fund, London, 1891 [contains a plan of excavations and a photograph of the head of Rameses by the Count d'Hulst].
