= Basatin cemetery =

Coordinates: 29°59′35″N 31°16′23″E

Basatin cemetery (مقابر اليهود بالبساتين) is a Jewish cemetery in Cairo, Egypt, that covers an area of approximately 120 acres. It is believed to be the world's second-oldest Jewish cemetery and was founded in the 9th century before their mass migration from Egypt.

== Founding ==
The Basatin Cemetery, known locally as the "Jewish Cemetery," contains the remains of Egyptian Jews and those residing in Egypt before their mass exodus from the country. According to the Jewish community in Cairo, the Basatin Jewish Cemetery is the second oldest Jewish cemetery in the world. It covers an area of approximately 120 acres, divided between the Karaite and Rabbinic communities. It was donated by Ahmad ibn Tulun in the ninth century AD.

The 120-acre plot was part of the Basatin Desert, according to the Jewish community in Egypt, and it is considered one of its temples. This area was filled with residents of the cemetery, and an area called Ezbet el-Nasr was built on the ruins of these cemeteries. This area continued to include the residential area adjacent to the remaining area of the Jewish cemeteries. The area contains the Fustat school complex and several mosques. It is bordered to the south by the Ring Road, to the east by the Autostrad, to the north by the Leather Tanning Company, and to the west by the Car Market. The remaining Jewish cemetery represents less than 30% of the cemeteries that existed before 1970, and the majority of these cemeteries were settled by residents coming from outside Cairo.

Over time, informal buildings spread around it on all sides, and the area was given this name (Turb al-Yahud) or Ezbet al-Nasr. Some small marble workshops operate on these lands, manufacturing small marble products that depend in their manufacture on marble imported from the neighboring area called Shaq al-Tiban (Snake Passage), famous for the giant marble factories established by the people of al-Basatin and other professionals in this industry. The granite and marble industry represents a major source of national income due to its export industry, in addition to being an industry that requires intensive labor depending on the number or size of the workforce. The visitor area of al-Basatin Cemetery, or "Jewish Cemetery," now includes three main areas: The General Cemetery, the Haim Capucci Cemetery, and the Musa Mensha Cemetery. Located on the eastern side of Basateen, between downtown Cairo and the Maadi district, it is bordered to the south by the Ring Road, to the east by Nasr Road (the autostrade), to the north by the leather tanneries, and to the west by the Arab market.

== Burials ==
The most famous person buried in the Jewish cemetery is "Yaqoub ibn Killis", who was entrusted by Caliph Al-Mu'izz li-Din Allah with the responsibility of collecting taxes, which demonstrates the degree of tolerance between Muslims and Jews, and Rabbi Saadia Gaon, known as Saeed Al-Fayyumi, one of those who wrote the Holy Bible in the Arabic language and laid the foundations of Hebrew grammar, and was considered internationally as a prominent Jewish, literary and political figure in the Middle Ages, as well as "Moses Ben Maimon" who settled in Egypt since 1165 AD and served as the court physician of Sultan Salah al-Din al-Ayyubi, and held the position of head of the Jewish community.

Among the most famous Jewish families there, who have influenced the Egyptian economy, are the Mossiri family, the Qattawi family, the Menashe family, the Adas family, and the Rollo family, who have had a significant impact through their donations to increase the cemetery's area. For the Jews in the orchards, and represented Italian interests in Egypt.

Among the figures included in the Jewish cemeteries in Al-Basatin is Youssef Al-Qudsi, who documents record a contract signed between him and the king's special overseer at Abdeen Palace to supply furniture and chairs, along with a list of them, in 1938. Rabbi David Friedman, whose tombstone is dated 1882, is not indicated on his date of birth or death. He is from the Jews of Perth, Australia.

Also, there is the cemetery of Singer, the writer Isaac Bashevis Singer, who was born in Poland to a rabbinic family. His novels chronicle an important period in Jewish history. He was born in 1904 and died in 1990. There is also the cemetery of Jacob de Menashe, head of the Menashe family, who was born in Cairo in 1807 and continued to live there, where he worked in the currency trade in the Jewish Quarter. He died in 1887.

Burned there are Regine Isaac Levy, who died on December 25, 1991; Rosa Spitten, who died on August 24, 1995; Serene Berdemberg, who died in 1997; Robert Tahman, born in 1914 and died in 1999; Sari Ezra, who died on November 22, 1942; Rose Zafrani, whose information has been obliterated by time; Ahrentine, born in July 1862 and died in December 1895; Dimond Saridar, who died on July 16, 1942; Belaho Vsky, who died on August 27, 1945; Abdi Perez, born in 1913 and died in 1945; and Rachel Perez, who died on August 27, 1945. And Bakina Levy, whose dates are unknown, and Haim Bigio, who died on November 25, 1944, are all prominent businessmen in the Egyptian economy.

== Development ==
A plan was developed by the Jewish community in Egypt to develop the cemetery and find burial sites for famous people within it, with external donations from the American Embassy in Egypt.
