= Religious harmony in India =

Love, and affection in between different religions in India

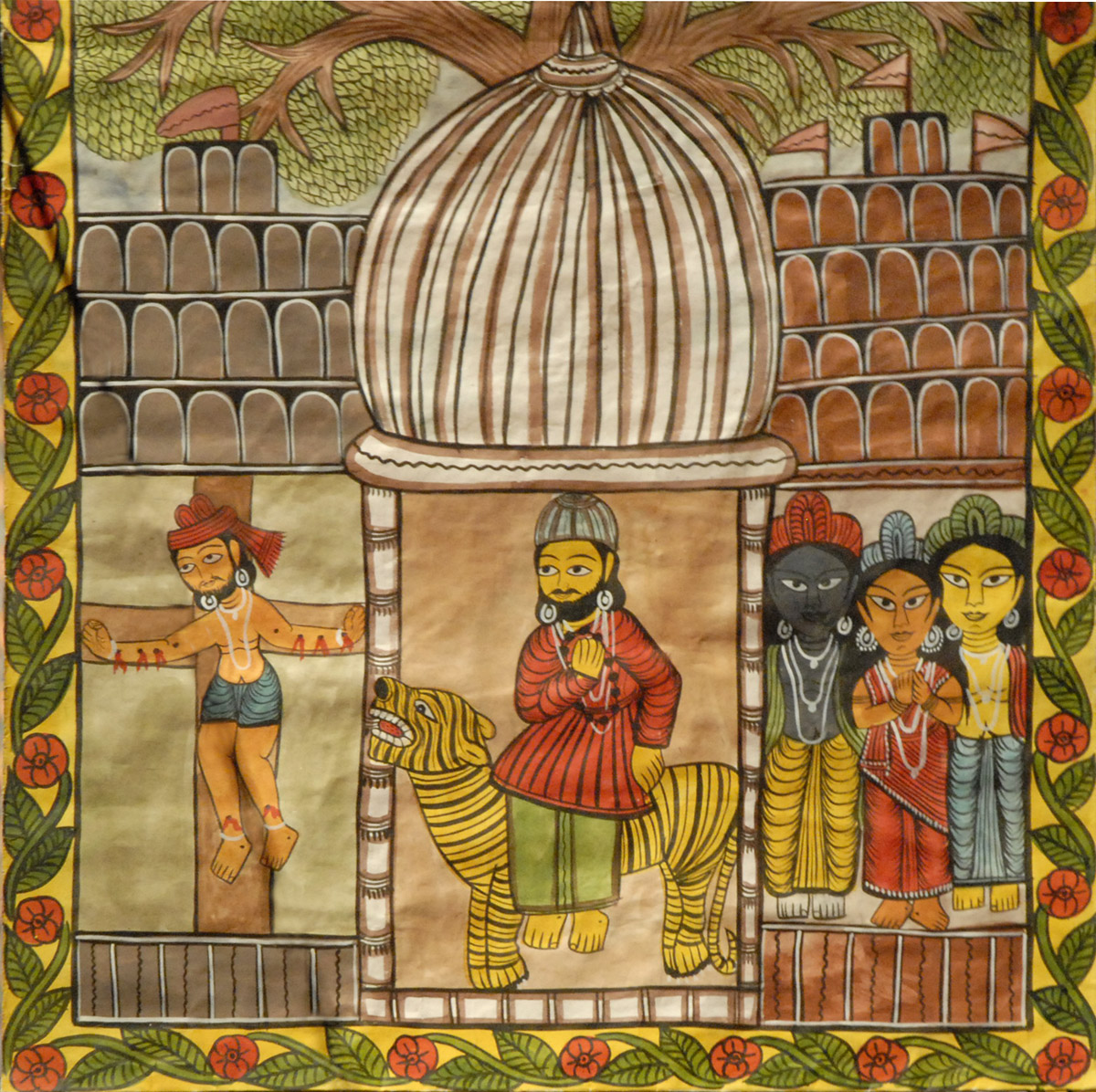
A symbol of religious and social/communal harmony.

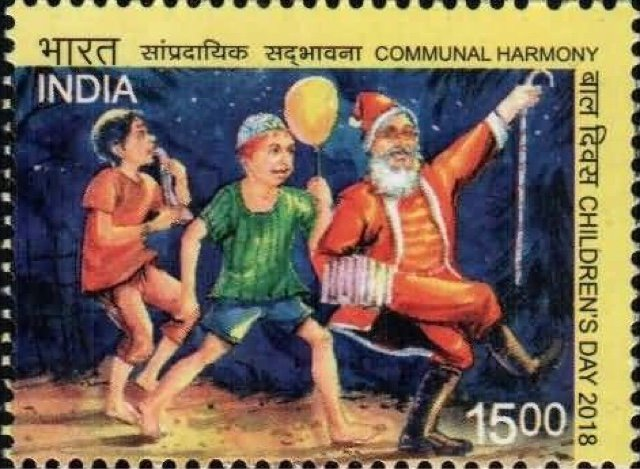
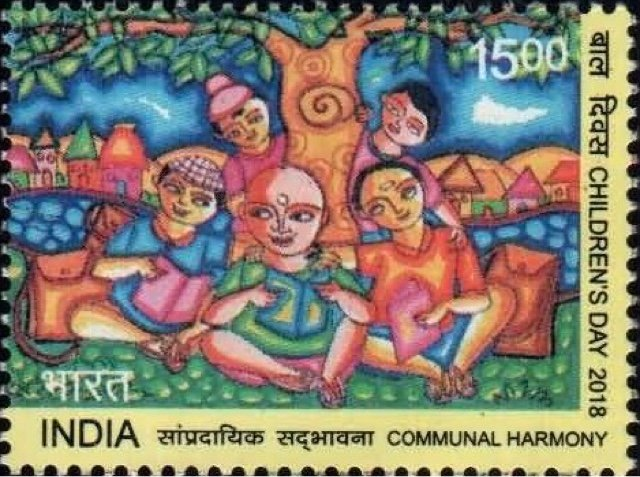
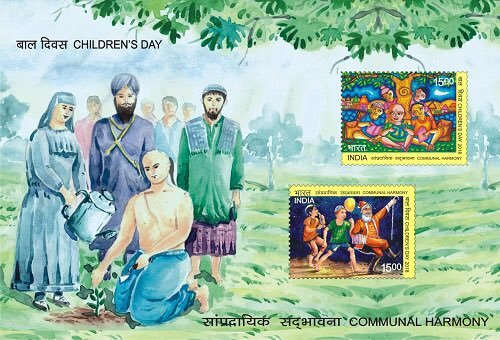
Postage stamps of India showing communal harmony in India.

Religious harmony in India is a concept that indicates that there is love, affection between different religions throughout the history of the Indian subcontinent. In the modern-day Republic of India, the Indian constitution supports and encourages religious harmony. In India, every citizen has a right to choose and practice any religion. Most Indians across religious groups say that respecting all religions is very important to being “truly Indian”. There are several examples of interfaith cooperation over places of worship: In Punjab, Sikh and Hindu villagers have donated land and money to build a mosque, and maintain another mosque in a village with no Muslim residents, while in another example, a muslim couple and their Sikh neighbours built a Hindu temple for two Hindu families of a village. In Bihar a Muslim family donated land for the construction of world's largest Hindu temple. Hindu Mandir.Muslims and Sikhs building temples together. Seers of religions call for religious harmony in India.

India is the largest secular state in the world. The Preamble to the Constitution of India states that India is a secular state, and the Constitution of India has declared the right to freedom of religion to be a fundamental right. India has the largest number of followers of Hinduism, Sikhism, Zoroastrianism (i.e. Parsis and Iranis), Jainism, and the Bahá'í Faith in the world. It further hosts the third most followers of Islam, behind Indonesia and Pakistan, the ninth largest population of Buddhists and the fifteenth largest population of Christians. Several tribal religions are also present in India, such as Donyi-Polo, Sanamahism, Sarnaism, Niamtre, and others.

Jana Gana Mana (The first stanza of the original song "Bharoto Bhagyo Bidhata"), India's national anthem, written by polymath, activist and country's first Nobel laureate Rabindranath Tagore, promotes communal harmony by referencing various religious communities within its lyrics. The second verse of the song Bharoto Bhagyo Bidhata specifically mentions "Hindu, Bauddho, Sikh, Jain, Parasik, Musalman, Khristani" demonstrating unity among diverse faiths. This reflects the anthem's intention to unite all Indians, regardless of their religious background, under the banner of a single nation.

For popular film stars in India like Salman Khan, festivals of Hindus and Muslims are equal. According to Dalai Lama, India is a model for religious harmony. He mentions that "In the last 2000–3000 years, different religious traditions, such as Jainism, Islam, Sikhism, and others, have flourished here. The whole concept of religious harmony is the most valuable treasure of India." In a lecture organized on the silver jubilee of Seshadripuram Educational Trust, Dalai Lama further said that though religions have various philosophies and spiritual traditions, all of them carry the same message of love. He also emphasized the importance of acknowledging each other as brothers and sisters. As mentioned by Dalai Lama, reviving ancient Indian knowledge helps us to live peacefully and in perfect harmony with other communities. This kind of knowledge guides us to the right path and paves the way for a happy and peaceful community and world.

== Historical traditions and practices ==
=== In Vedic Era ===
The ancient Indian scripture Rigveda endeavors plurality of religious thought with its mention "ekaM sadvipraa bahudhaa vadanti " (Sanskrit: एकं सद्विप्रा बहुधा वदन्ति)– meaning wise people explain the same truth in different manners. It is a Upanishadic statement from the yore which signifies that "One God Is Worshipped In Different Names." It also literally means "Truth is one, the wise perceive it differently". We might call God in various names but perceive him in multiple ways but he is the only one or the enlightened one.

=== Ashoka's Thoughts ===
Ashoka (304–232 BC), in his 12th edict stated:

"The beloved of the gods, king Piyadasi, honors both ascetics and the householders of all religions, and he honors them with gifts and honors of various kinds. . Whoever praises his religion, due to excessive devotion, and condemns others with the thought "Let me glorify my religion," only harms his religion. Therefore contact between religions is good. One should listen to and respect the doctrines professed by others. The beloved of the gods, king Piyadasi, desires that all should be well-learned in the good doctrines of other religions. "

After the Kalinga war, Ashoka adopted the philosophy of Buddhism and devoted himself to the promotion of Dhamma. He was also known as the pioneer of social harmony. For him, dharma was not restricted to religion or religious beliefs. Dhamma was rather a way of life that revolved around moral principles. These principles would provide a moral law to humans and not malign or demean any other religion to establish your religion. In his second inscription, he wrote, "What is Dhamma? Minor misdeeds and more misdeeds. Avoiding evils like fury, cruelty, anger, arrogance, and jealousy and attachment in kindness, generosity, truth, self-control, simplicity, purity of heart, and morality. Observance of ethics, internal and external purity etc."

=== Other notable peoples ===
Kharavela (193 BC – after 170 BC) was the third and greatest emperor of the Mahameghavahana dynasty of Kaḷinga (present-day Odisha). The main source of information about Khārabeḷa is his famous seventeen lines rock-cut Hātigumphā inscription in a cave in the Udayagiri hills near Bhubaneswar, Odisha. The inscription states that Emperor Kharavela had a liberal religious spirit. Kharavela describes himself as: " सव पासंड पूजको सवदेवायतन संकार कारको " (Prakrit language, Devanagari script) Translation: The worshiper of all religious orders, the restorer of shrines of all gods.

The Grahapati Kokkala inscription dated to 1000–1001 AD equates Verse 3 equates Shiva with Parama Brahma, Buddha, Vaman, and Jina.

=== Ramkrishna's Teachings ===
Ramakrishna Paramahamsa, a key figure of the 19th century Bengal Renaissance, was a religious Indian mystic during British colonial period. He recognised differences among religions but realised that in spite of these differences, all religions lead to the same ultimate goal, and hence they are all valid and true. He adhered to various religious practices from the Hindu traditions of Vaishnavism, Tantric Shaktism, and Advaita Vedanta, as well as Christianity and Islam. His parable-based teachings advocated the essential unity of religions and proclaimed that world religions are "so many paths to reach one and the same goal". His famous maxim, "Yato mat, Tato path" (Bengali:যত মত, তত পথ) can be stated as: “As many faiths, so many paths”. His most prominent disciple Swami Vivekananda carried on his teachings and philosophy to the world.

"I have practised all religions - Hinduism, Islam, Christianity - and I have also followed the paths of the different Hindu sects. I have found that it is the same God toward whom all are directing their steps, though along different paths. You must try all beliefs and traverse all the different ways once. Wherever I look, I see men quarrelling in the name of religion - Hindus, Mohammedans, Brahmos, Vaishnavas, and the rest. But they never reflect that He who is called Krishna is also called Siva, and bears the name of the Primal Energy, Jesus, and Allah as well - the same Rama with a thousand names. A lake has several Ghats. At one, the Hindus take water in pitchers and call it ' Jal '; at another the Mussalmans take water in leather bags and call it ' pani '. At a third the Christians call it ' water '. Can we imagine that it is not ' Jal ', but only ' pani ' or ' water '? How ridiculous! The substance is One under different names, and everyone is seeking the same substance; only climate, temperament, and name create differences. Let each man follow his own path. If he sincerely and ardently wishes to know God, peace be unto him! He will surely realize Him."

— Ramakrishna

"I have practised all religions—Hinduism, Islam, Christianity—and I have also followed the paths of the different Hindu sects. I have found that it is the same God toward whom all are directing their steps, though along different paths. You must try all beliefs and traverse all the different ways once. Wherever I look, I see men quarrelling in the name of religion—Hindus, Mohammedans, Brahmos, Vaishnavas, and the rest. But they never reflect that He who is called Krishna is also called Siva, and bears the name of the Primal Energy, Jesus, and Allah as well—the same Rama with a thousand names..."

== During Indian Independence Movement ==
=== Composite nationalism ===
Composite nationalism is a concept that argues that people of diverse ethnicities, cultures, tribes, castes, communities, and faiths, collectively comprise the Indian nation. The idea teaches that "nationalism cannot be defined by religion in India." While Indian citizens maintain their distinctive religious traditions, they are members of one united Indian nation. Composite nationalism maintains that prior to the arrival of the British into the subcontinent, no enmity between people of different religious faiths existed; and as such these artificial divisions can be overcome by Indian society. Composite nationalism is generally considered the opposite of the two-nation theory, which led to the partition of India, posited that Hindus and Muslims were distinct nations and could not coexist in a single state.

=== Netaji's Thoughts ===
Netaji Subhas Chandra Bose's concept of nationalism was deeply rooted in the idea of "composite nationalism," which emphasized unity among diverse groups in India to achieve independence from British rule. He believed that communalism, based on religious, ethnic or cultural differences, hindered the progress of the nation and advocated for a synthesis of various religious and cultural traditions to foster a strong, unified national identity.

Hugh Toye's 1959 book, The Springing Tiger, describes Bose's determination to abolish caste and religious distinctions, citing an Indian National Army sepoy who said, "In India we have many religions and many gods. But here everything is Jai Hind." In An Indian Pilgritem: An Unfinished Biography, Bose rejected divisive historical narratives, writing:

“I am inclined, however, to think that in proportion to their numbers, and considering India as a whole, the Muslims have never ceased to play an important role in the public life of the country, whether before or under British rule-and that the distinction between Hindu and Muslim of which we hear so much nowadays is largely an artificial creation, a kind of Catholic-Protestant controversy in Ireland, in which our present-day rulers (i.e. the British) have had a hand.”

He further argued:

“History will bear me out when I say that it is a misnomer to talk of Muslim rule when describing the political order in India prior to the advent of the British… Whether we talk of Moghul Emperors at Delhi, or of the Muslim Kings of Bengal, we shall find that in either case the administration was run by Hindus and Muslims together, many of the prominent Cabinet Ministers and Generals being Hindus.”

This historical understanding led Bose to mobilise people across faiths in India's freedom struggle. He criticised Hindutva figures like V.D. Savarkar for collaborating with the British, equating Savarkar's actions with those of Mohammad Ali Jinnah's Muslim nationalism.

"I would request Mr. Jinnah, Mr. Savarkar, and all those leaders who still think of a compromise with the British, to realise once for all that in the world of tomorrow there will be no British Empire."

Bose's commitment to inclusivity was evident in his desire to adopt a national song which would be acceptable to all Indians regardless of their religious creed. He readily concurred with Rabindranath Tagore (as a member of the review committee for a national anthem) when Tagore said of Bankim Chandra’s iconic ‘Vande Mataram’ — a portion of which has been adopted as India’s national song — that its core “is a hymn to goddess Durga: this is so plain that there can be no debate about it. Of course, Bankim does show Durga to be inseparably united with Bengal in the end, but no Mussalman can be expected patriotically to worship the ten-handed deity as Swadesh (the nation).”

== Places of worship promoting Religious Harmony ==
=== Dharmasthala Temple ===
Dharmasthala Temple is an example of religious harmony in India, as the priests of the temple are Madhwa Brahmins, who are Vaishnava, and the administration is run by a Jain Bunt family. The deities of the temple are Hindu god Shiva, who is referred to as Mañjunatha, Hindu goddess Ammanavaru, the Tirthankara Chandraprabha and the protective gods of Jainism, Kalarahu, Kalarkayi, Kumarasvami and Kanyakumari.

=== Ajmer Sharif Dargah ===
A dargah is a shrine built over the grave of a revered religious figure, often a Sufi saint or dervish. Sufis often visit the shrine for ziyarat, a term associated with religious visits and "pilgrimages". Within Islamic Sufism or in other words, Islamic mysticism, Sufi Saints often shared messages of unity to the divine and promoted love of God, discouraging the discrimination of people solely based on religious denomination. For these historical and cultural reasons, dargahs, such as the Ajmer Sharif Dargah, have been a place for Muslims, Hindus, and people of other faiths since medieval times.

=== Satya Pir Temples in Bengal ===
Satya Pir is a belief system found in Bengal created by the fusion of Hindu, Islam and local religions. Experts maintain that the Muslim Satya Pir and the Hindu Satyanarayan essentially represent the same beliefs and rituals. A century ago in Bengal, the ritual called, pujah was mainly performed by Hindu women and was interchangeably called Satya pir Pujah or Satya Narayan pujah.

=== Bonbibi and Dakshin Rai Temples in Sundarbans (Bengal) ===
Bonbibi, is a legendary goddess of the forest, dubbed as a guardian spirit of the forests and venerated by both the Hindu and the Muslim residents of the Sundarbans (the largest mangrove forest in the world spread across Southern Bangladesh and West Bengal in Eastern India north of Bay of Bengal and home to the Bengal Tigers). She is called upon mostly by the honey-collectors and the woodcutters before entering the forest for protection against the attacks from the tigers. It is believed that the demon king, Dakkhin Rai (or Dakshin Rai; meaning Lord of the South), an arch-enemy of Bonbibi actually appears in the disguise of a tiger and attacks human beings.

== Punnathala ==
Punnathala is an example of religious harmony in India, as the Harmony Village in Malappuram district, Kerala. This is a village known for religious harmony, The village is celebrating the Hindus and Muslims coming together to follow tradition and celebrate festivals is known for its tradition of maintaining communal harmony.

== Efforts ==
=== Public efforts ===
The late 19th century and early 20th century Indian guru and yogi Sai Baba of Shirdi preached religious harmony through his teaching. To practise and promote it he combined the celebration of the Hindu festival of Rama Navami with a Muslim Urs. Lokmanya Tilak organised the programmes like Ganesh Chaturthi and Shivjayanti to preach religious harmony among the people. Muslims used to play the dhol during the visarjan of the Ganesha idol that marks the culmination of Ganesh Chaturthi. The Lalbaugcha Raja of Mumbai, an annually set up Ganesha idol, is also worshipped by Muslims. Durga Puja (UNESCO Intangible Cultural Heritage since 2021) in West Bengal is not just a Hindu festival nowadays; it's a cultural event that often embodies communal harmony, with instances of Muslims actively participating in and contributing to the festivities along with Hindu brothers. These instances range from Muslim families assisting in idol-making and decorations to organizing the pujas itself. In 2019, a Hindu family in West Bengal chose to worship a Muslim girl as a part of Kumari Puja, a ritual performed during Durga Puja.

=== Government's efforts ===
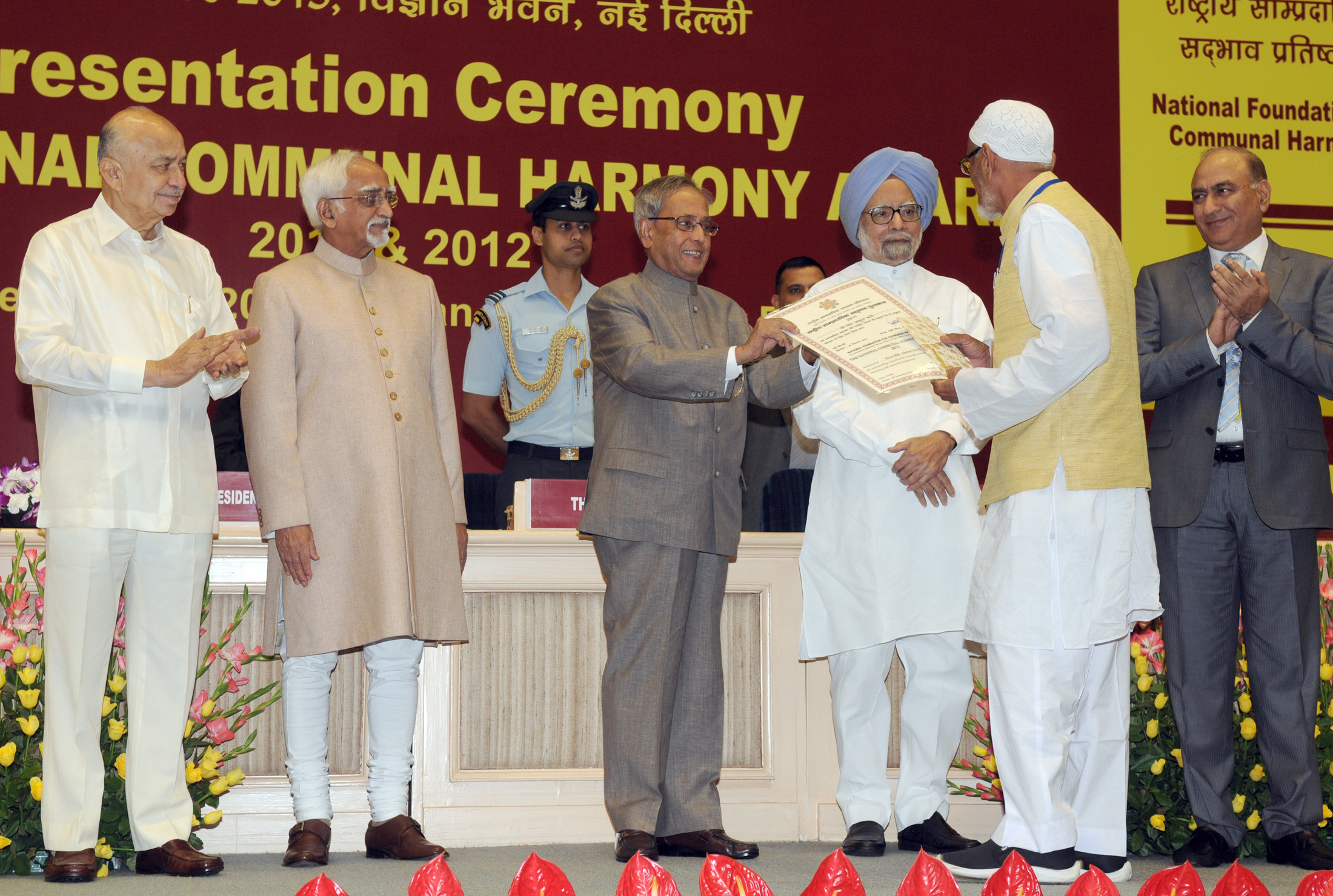
The President, Pranab Mukherjee presenting the National Communal Harmony Award 2012-2013, in New Delhi. The Vice President, Mohammad Hamid Ansari, the Prime Minister, Dr. Manmohan Singh, the Union Home Minister, Sushilkumar Shinde and the Union Home Secretary, Anil Goswami are also seen.

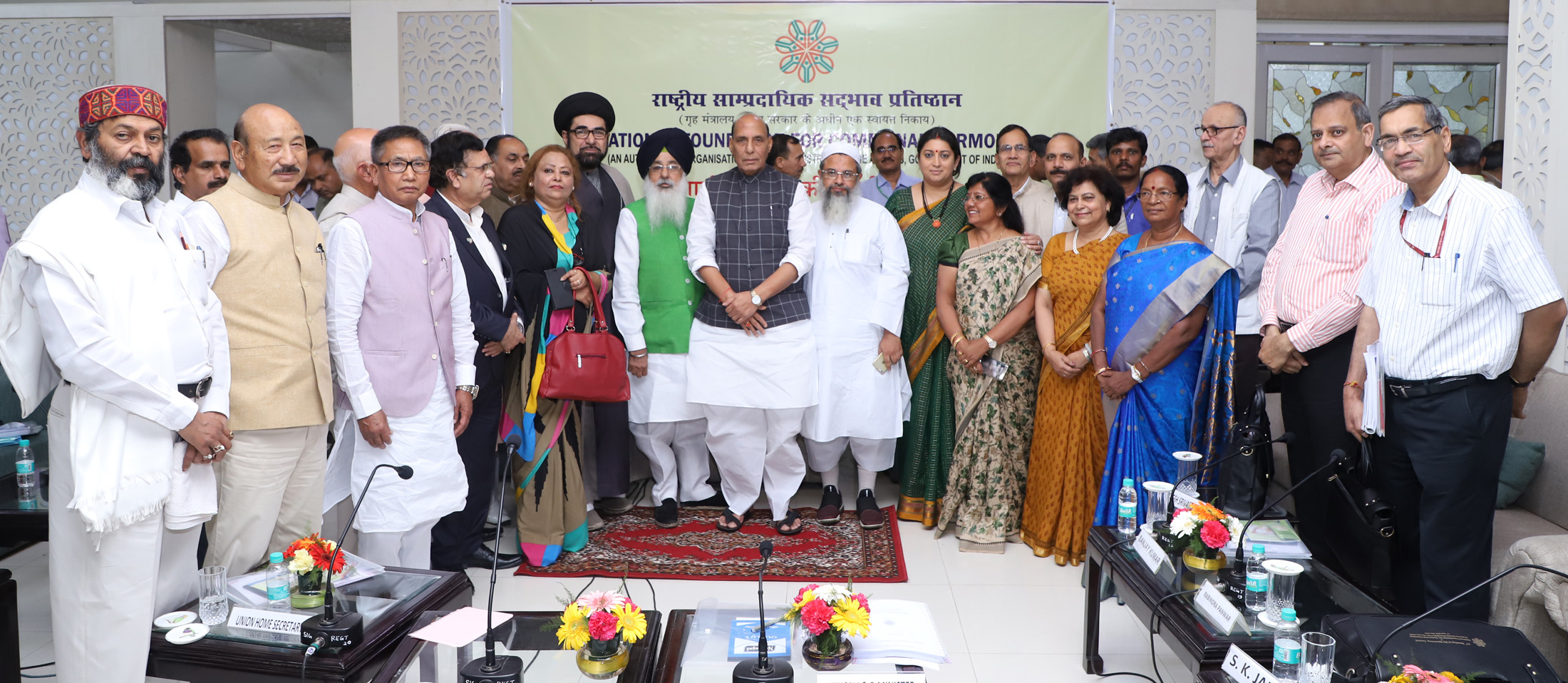
The Union Home Minister, Rajnath Singh in a group photograph with the members, during the 21st meeting of the Governing Council of National Foundation for Communal Harmony, in New Delhi on April 12, 2018.

== Political, military, and business leaders ==
Even though India is predominantly Hindu, its leaders have often included Muslims, Sikhs, Christians, Jains, Zoroastrians, etc.

- Presidents of India: Dr. Zakir Hussain, Fakhruddin Ali Ahmed, and Dr. A. P. J. Abdul Kalam were Muslim, and Giani Zail Singh was a Sikh.
- Chiefs of Army Staff: General (Later Field Marshal) Sam Hormusji Framji Jamshedji Manekshaw MC was a Zoroastrian; General Sunith Francis Rodrigues was a Christian; and General Joginder Jaswant Singh PVSM, AVSM, VSM, ADC, and General Bikram Singh PVSM, UYSM, AVSM, SM, VSM, ADC are Sikhs.
- Chiefs of Air Staff: Air Marshal Aspy Merwan Engineer DFC, and Air Chief Marshal Fali Homi Major PVSM, AVSM, SC, VM, ADC were/are Zoroastrians (Parsis); Air Marshal (later Air Chief Marshal and Marshal of The Indian Air Force) Arjan Singh DFC, Air Chief Marshal Dilbagh Singh PVSM, AVSM, VM, and Air Chief Marshal Birender Singh Dhanoa PVSM, AVSM, YSM, VM, ADC were/are Sikhs; Air Chief Marshal Idris Hasan Latif PVSM was a Muslim; and Air Chief Marshal Denis Anthony La Fontaine PVSM, AVSM, VM was a Christian.
- The list of India's 100 richest people (as of 2019) includes Dilip Shanghvi, a Jain, Azim Premji, a Muslim, and Pallonji Mistri, a Zoroastrian.

== See also ==
- Composite nationalism
- Hindu–Muslim unity
- Din-i Ilahi
- Ethnic relations in India
- Religion in India
- Freedom of religion in India
- Ganga-Jamuni tehzeeb
- Phool Walon Ki Sair
- Religious syncretism
- Sarva Dharma Sammelan
- Ajmer Sharif Dargah
- Punnathala Communal Harmony Village
- Indian religions
