= Bengali mythology =

Bengali mythology is a mixture of influences from Islamic mythology, Vedic mythology, Buddhist mythology, Sufism and local Folklore. It can refer to historical legends and folk tales of Bangladesh and West Bengal. Given the historical Hindu and Buddhist presence in the region, characters from Vedic and Hindu mythology are present within Bengali literature. Later Islamic settlement introduced elements that draw from the Middle East. One example of the Vedic and Islamic legend transaction is the progenitor of Bengalis known as Bonga. Hindu literature credits him as ancient Hindu Prince Vanga, adopted son of King Vali. Muslim accounts refer to him as Bong, son of Hind who was the grandson of Noah.

== Philosophy ==
=== Buddhism ===
The works of philosophers from Bengal are preserved at libraries in Tibet, China and Central Asia. Buddhist figures from Bengal include:

- Atisa
- Tilopa
- Chandragomin
- Traillokyachandra
- Vanaratna

=== Sufism ===
Sufi philosophy was highly influential in Islamic Bengal. Prominent Sufi practitioners were disciples of Jalaluddin Rumi, Abdul-Qadir Gilani and Moinuddin Chishti. One of the most revered Sufi saints of Bengal is Shah Jalal. Sufi spiritual traditions are central to the Bengali Muslim way of life. The most common Sufi ritual is the Dhikr, the practice of repeating the names of God after prayers. Sufi teachings regard Muhammad as the primary perfect man who exemplifies the morality of God. Sufism is regarded as the individual internalization and intensification of Islamic faith and practice. Sufis played a vital role in developing Bengali Muslim society during the medieval period. Baul is a Bengali mendicant folk sect influenced by concepts of Sufism. Historic Sufi missionaries are regarded as saints, including:

- Shah Jalal
- Jalaluddin Tabrizi
- Shah Ali Baghdadi
- Fakhruddin Mubarak Shah
- Syed Rashid Ahmed Jaunpuri
- Khan Jahan Ali
- Shah Amanat
- Shah Makhdum Rupos
- Khwaja Enayetpuri

==== Bengali Pirs ====
- Gazi Pir
- Satya Pir
- Pir Yemeni
- Manik pir

== Syncretism ==
As part of the conversion process, a syncretic version of mystical Sufi Islam was historically prevalent in medieval and early modern Bengal. The Islamic concept of tawhid was adapted into the veneration of Hindu folk deities, who became regarded as pirs. Many folk deities were worshipped as pirs among the poorer sections of Muslim society alongside Bengalis of other religious beliefs. These practices almost entirely died out with the spread of Islamic revivalism.

=== Bengali folk deities ===
- Shitala (goddess/pir of smallpox)
- Oladevi (goddess/pir of cholera)
- Bonbibi (protector of forests, mainly sunderban)
- Dakshin Rai
- Manasa

=== Hindu deities ===
- Chaitanya
- Jagaddhatri
- Shashthi
- Basuli
- Yogadya
- Boroma
- Tusu
- Rankini Kali
- Dhelai chandi
- Jvarasura
- Ghaghar Buri
- Dharma Thakur

== See also ==
- Bangladeshi folk literature
- Ghosts in Bengali culture
- Sufism
- Islamic mythology
- Hindu mythology
- Buddhist mythology
- Sufism in Bangladesh
- Mangal-Kāvya
