= Tiger attacks in the Sundarbans =

Tiger attacks in the Sundarbans, in India and Bangladesh are estimated to kill from 0-50 (mean of 22.7 between 1947 and 1983) people per year. The Sundarbans is home to over 100 Bengal tigers, one of the largest single populations of tigers in one area. Before the modern era, Sundarbans tigers were said to "regularly kill fifty or sixty people a year". Some modern estimates are even higher, at over 100 fatalities a year. Many such attacks aren’t reported to the authorities because victims enter parts of the forest without legal permission.

These tigers are slightly smaller and slimmer than those elsewhere in India but remain extremely powerful and are infamous for destroying small wooden boats. They are not the only tigers who live close to humans; in Bandhavgarh, villages encircle the tiger reserves, and yet attacks on people are rare. Although attacks were stalled temporarily in 2004 with new precautions, they have been on the rise. This is particularly due to the devastation on the Bangladeshi side of the swamp caused by Cyclone Sidr which decreased the availability of their habitual food sources (due to the natural upheaval) and has prompted them to migrate towards the more populated side of the swamp in India.

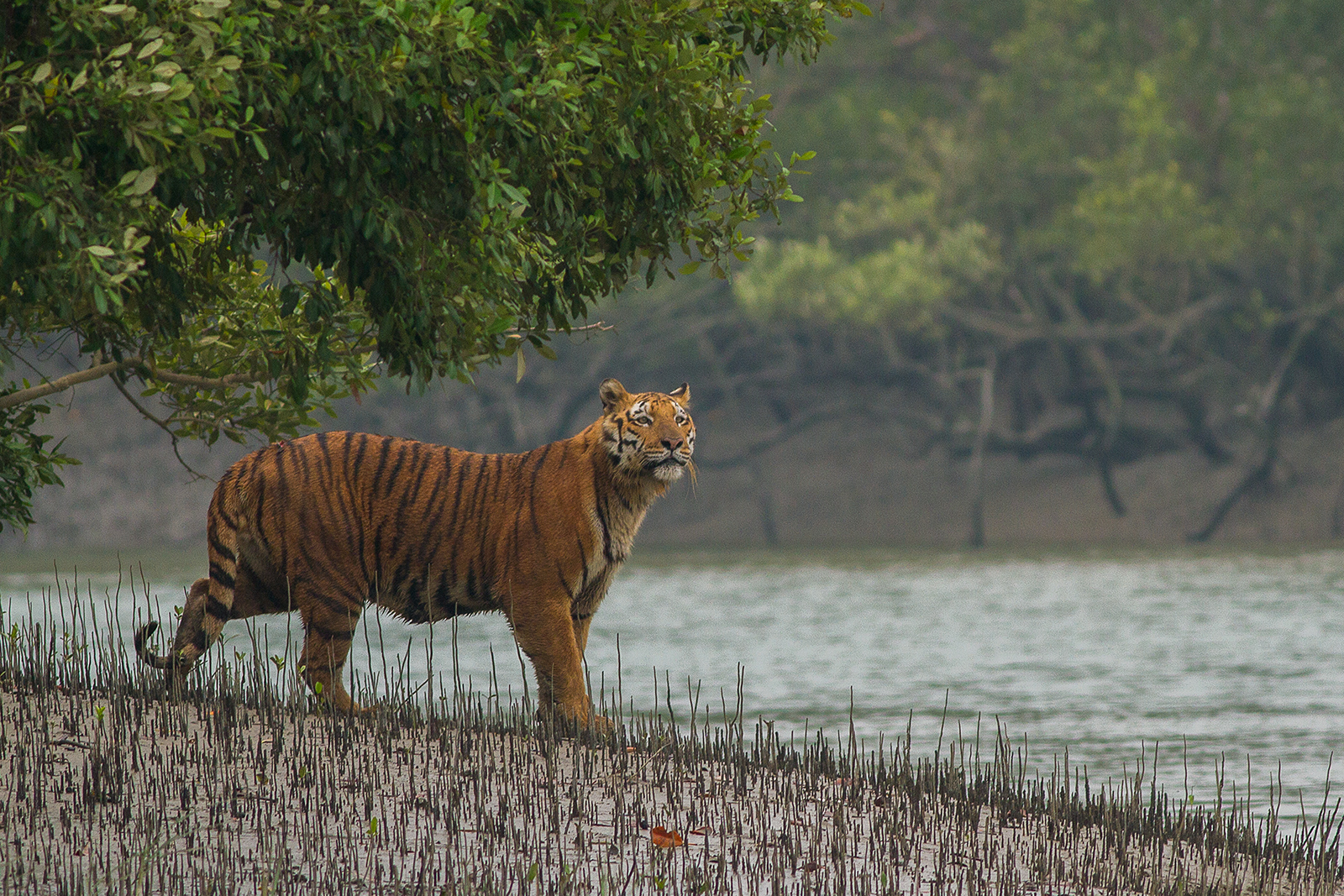
A Bengal tiger in the Sundarbans

== Precautions ==
The locals and government officials take certain precautions to prevent attacks. Local low-caste Bengali Hindu fishermen will say prayers and perform rituals to the forest goddess Bonbibi before setting out on expeditions. Invocations to the tiger god Dakshin Ray are also considered a necessity by the local populace for safe passage throughout the Sundarbans area. Low-caste Bengali Muslims living in the Bangladeshi side seek intercession of Gazi Pir in repelling tiger attacks. Fishermen and bushmen originally created masks made to look like faces to wear on the back of their heads because tigers always attack from behind. This worked for a short time, but the tigers quickly caught on to the ruse, and the attacks reportedly continued. One local honey gatherer, Surendra Jana, 57, summarised the general feeling of the tigers adapting to their efforts: "Before we could understand the way they attacked...We don't feel safe any more, knowing our brothers have been attacked in spite of the tricks we use." Government officials wear stiff pads that rise up the back of the neck, similar to the pads of an American football player. This is to prevent the tigers from biting into the spine, which is their favoured attack method.

== Causes of the attacks ==
Between 35,000 and 140,000 workers frequent the swamps and waterways of the Sundarbans. Fishing boats traverse the area and many stop to collect firewood, honey and other items. In the dark forest, tigers find it easy to stalk and attack men absorbed in their work. Even fishermen in small boats have been attacked due to tigers' strong swimming abilities.

== Responses to the attacks ==
Local villagers, who fear tiger attacks and resent the animal for killing their livestock, sometimes engage in revenge killings. On one occasion, a tiger had attacked and wounded the people in a village in south-west Bangladesh (near the Sundarbans) and frequently preyed upon their livestock. This roused the wrath of the villagers, and the feline became a target for their retribution. Poachers are also responsible for killing tigers in the reserve in an effort to sell them on the black market.

The human death rate has dropped significantly due to better management techniques and fewer people are killed each year. Even at the rate of fifty or sixty kills per year, humans would provide only about three percent of the yearly food requirements for the tiger population of the Sundarbans. Thus, humans are only a supplement to the tiger's diet; they do not provide a primary food source. This does not mean that the notoriety associated with this area is unfounded. Even if only 3% of a tiger's diet is human meat, that still amounts to the tiger killing and eating about one person per year, given the amount of food a tiger typically eats.

== Tiger widows ==
In the Sundarbans, there are over 3,000 women whose husbands have been killed by tigers. Most of these so-called "tiger widows" face social stigma, legal challenges, and financial hardship.

=== Ostracism ===
Sundarban islanders frequently shun tiger widows as swami khejos ('husband eaters' in Bengali). The belief that tiger widows are bad omens is derived from the religious text, The Miracles of Bonbibi, considered sacred by both Hindus and Muslims in the Sundarbans. In the text, Bonbibi, the spirit guardian of the wilderness, declared that anyone who stole from the forest out of greed would not be rescued if they were attacked by a tiger. This story led to the superstition that tiger attacks can be avoided by the penitence and austerity of a worker's wife back home. If the man is killed, it is viewed as divine punishment for the sins of the wife. Some believe the widows are actually devils. Others call them witches.

After the death of her husband, it is common for a tiger widow to be pushed out of the household by her in-laws, who have the authority to keep any of her male children. Religious leaders prohibit the tiger widows from spiritual activities, including their own husbands' funerals. One widow, Lolita Biswas, stated:

It’s terribly painful. I am so isolated. When I hear people speak about me, I go back home and cry alone. I am not allowed to show my face at religious occasions. So I prefer not to go anywhere. I take long walks instead, alone.

Tiger widows often face discrimination when seeking traditional jobs in agriculture, crabbing, and shrimping. According to one tiger widow, "No boatman will take us into the creeks as they fear they too would be consumed by the tigers." Widows frequently leave the area, hoping to become maids in nearby cities, but upon arrival, many are coerced into working at local brothels. For those who choose to stay behind in the Sundarbans, malnutrition is prevalent. Some widows are only able to ward off starvation by foraging roots and scraps from better-off families. Other women move to isolated villages like Bidhoba Para that are populated predominately by other tiger widows. However, local custom forbids children from living in these communities with their mothers. Though limited contact with their children is tolerated, frequent visits to the villages are discouraged. Those who reside in the tiger widow villages typically cultivate small agricultural plots, but increased salinity in the soil has rendered much of the crop ground in the Sundarbans infertile, even for small-scale subsistence farming.

Ultimately, most widows feel they have no choice but to fish the waters in the same jungles where their husbands were killed. A widow named Aparna Shiyali spoke of following in her husband's footsteps, saying, "It was a spring day when he went crab fishing and never returned. Now I go crab fishing because if I do not go, my children will starve."

=== Government compensation and legal obstacles ===
To combat the economic difficulties suffered by the tiger widows, the forest department of West Bengal in 2021 stipulated that any death due to a wild animal is eligible for a compensation of Rs. 500,000. Yet the families of victims rarely receive any form of payment. To apply for compensation, the forest department requires widows to produce a series of documents, including a post-mortem report, a death certificate, and a police report.

Post-mortem reports are unavailable if the woman cannot retrieve her husband's corpse, which is commonly carried off by the tiger. Without a post-mortem, death certificates will not list the cause of death as a tiger attack. Death certificates are also impossible to obtain without a police report, which are not always requested by the families of victims. Most attacks on fishermen go unreported to the police out of fear of punishment. About 75% of workers who enter the mangroves do so without the necessary legal permits, which is considered a criminal offense. The cost of acquiring the required permits can run high, as much as 600–700 USD. Meanwhile, the per capita income in the region is only 0.5 USD a day.

Even when a widow can produce her late husband's permits, police departments remain reluctant to issue reports on tiger attacks.

==== Other routes to recovery ====
Under to the Wildlife Protection Act of 1972, the family of a victim is entitled to payment through the fisheries department if the victim possessed a fisherman's identity card. However, illiteracy prevents many widows from finishing the application forms. Of 65 tiger widows surveyed in one study, only three could read.

In the past, private companies have offered life insurance for tiger attacks, but claims made by the beneficiaries have never been approved. Rather than disbursing the funds, the private insurers proclaimed it was their policy to wait until the forest department confirmed the victim met all the requirements for state compensation.
