= Shirini =

Iranian sweets

Shirini (شیرینی) literally means "sweets" in Persian language.

== In Iranian context ==
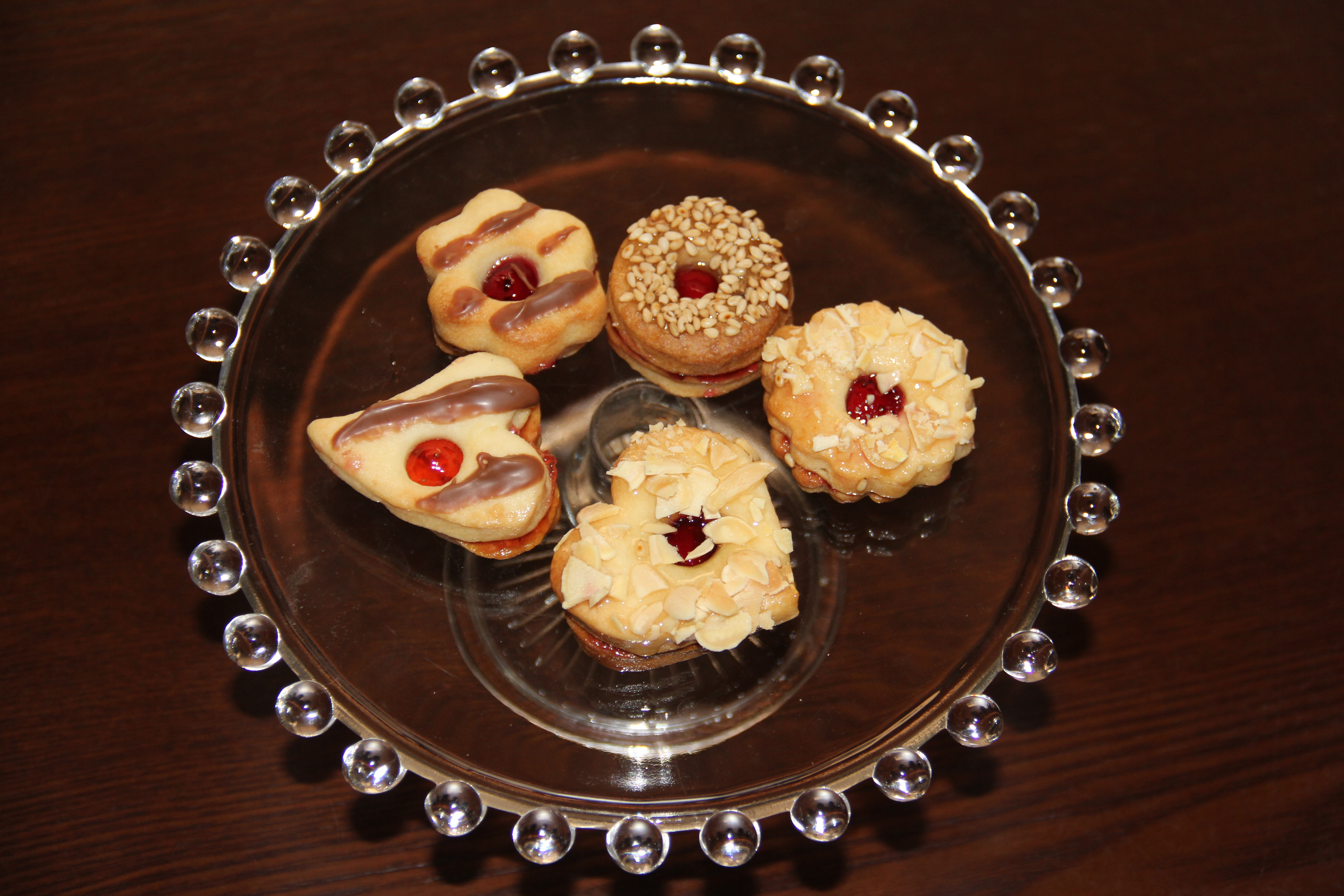
Persian marmalade cookies, locally called as shirini mashhadi (شیرینی مشهدی) or 'sweets from Mashhad'.

In Iranian culture shirini are given in celebration. For example engagement parties are called “shirini khori” which is when the woman’s family accepts the suitor and provides an engagement sweet tray to the grooms family. People will give shirini to relatives and those close after a wedding too in celebration similar to bonbonnieres. Other examples include a job promotion or graduation, where the individual who has graduated or been promoted may provide sweets to close ones.

== In Bengali context ==
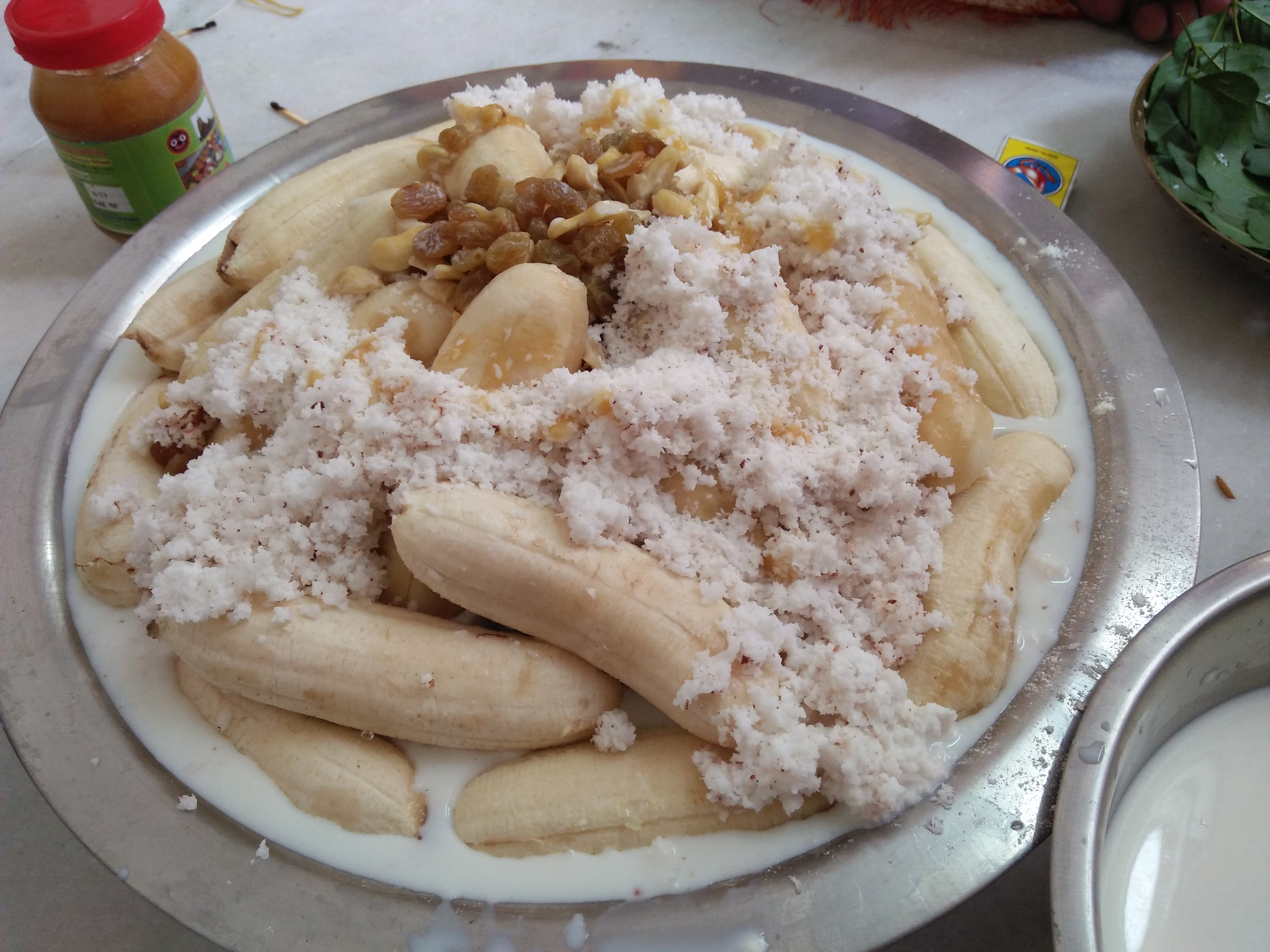
Shirni preparation during Satyanarayana Puja in a Bengali Hindu household in Howrah. The ingredients will be crushed by hand and kneaded manually to create a paste with dough-like texture.

Within the Bengali Muslim community, shirni (শিরনী), also colloquially termed as shinni (সিন্নি) is a sweet dish - a simple dough-like paste made out of combining wheat flour/maida/rice flour with milk, sugar/jaggery and bananas, to which other ingredients like ghee, crushed coconuts, almonds, date palm and raisins are optionally added. In the past, this decoction was used to be offered to entombed Sufi saints by votaries seeking their intercession and then distributed among the congregants similar to the concept of prasada. This practice fell out of use within the Muslim society due to rise of revivalist movements like Tariqah-i-Muhammadiya, Faraizi, Barelvi and Deobandi movements. Within Bengali Hindu society, shirni forms a distinctive element of Satyanarayana Puja, which is supposed to have evolved out of the syncretism with Satya Pir veneration of Muslims.

== In Afghan context ==
Shirini may also be used as a euphemism for bribes. In Afghanistan this took place under the Karzai administration. Bribery was a common occurrence in which people may refer to bribes as shirini. This can be attributed to the rampant culture of corruption and especially graft from police officers, who receive low salaries and are said to take bribes to subsist, to the highest level of government officials. Many interactions with authorities require shirini – like getting a new driver's license or paying a water or electricity bill. This discontent drove a wedge between the government and the Afghan people, who became increasingly resentful of the established politics under this administration. The western donors of Afghanistan and also by Afghan politicians, view the taming of corruption as crucial to the future of the country. As such, all candidates in the presidential elections in 2009 pledged to fight it. According to a survey by Integrity Watch Afghanistan in 2007, the average Afghan household had to pay round about $100 yearly in petty bribes, while 70 percent of the families in the poverty-stricken country survive on less than $1 a day.

The report of United Nations Office on Drugs and Crime (UNODC) titled Corruption in Afghanistan: Bribery as Reported by Victims, published in January 2010, calculated that Afghans had paid a staggering $1.2 billion bribes over a 12-month period ending Autumn 2009 – roughly equal to one quarter of the national GDP.
