= Jungle Nama =

2021 book by Amitav Ghosh

- First edition
- Author: Amitav Ghosh
- Subject: Fiction
- Published: February 2021 Fourth Estate
- Publication place: India
- Media type: Book
- Pages: 88
- ISBN: 978-9353579128

Jungle Nama is a graphic verse novel written by Indian author Amitav Ghosh and illustrated by Pakistani-American artist Salman Toor. It is a verse adaptation of the medieval Bengali tale about the Sundarbans Forest goddess, Bon Bibi. The book was first published on 12 February 2021 by Fourth Estate India and then in Great Britain on 11 November 2021 by John Murray Press. It is Ghosh's first book in verse. The story explores themes of greed and ecological misadventure. (1,3) Ghosh states that the story is an allegory for human caused climate change.

== Background ==
=== Setting ===
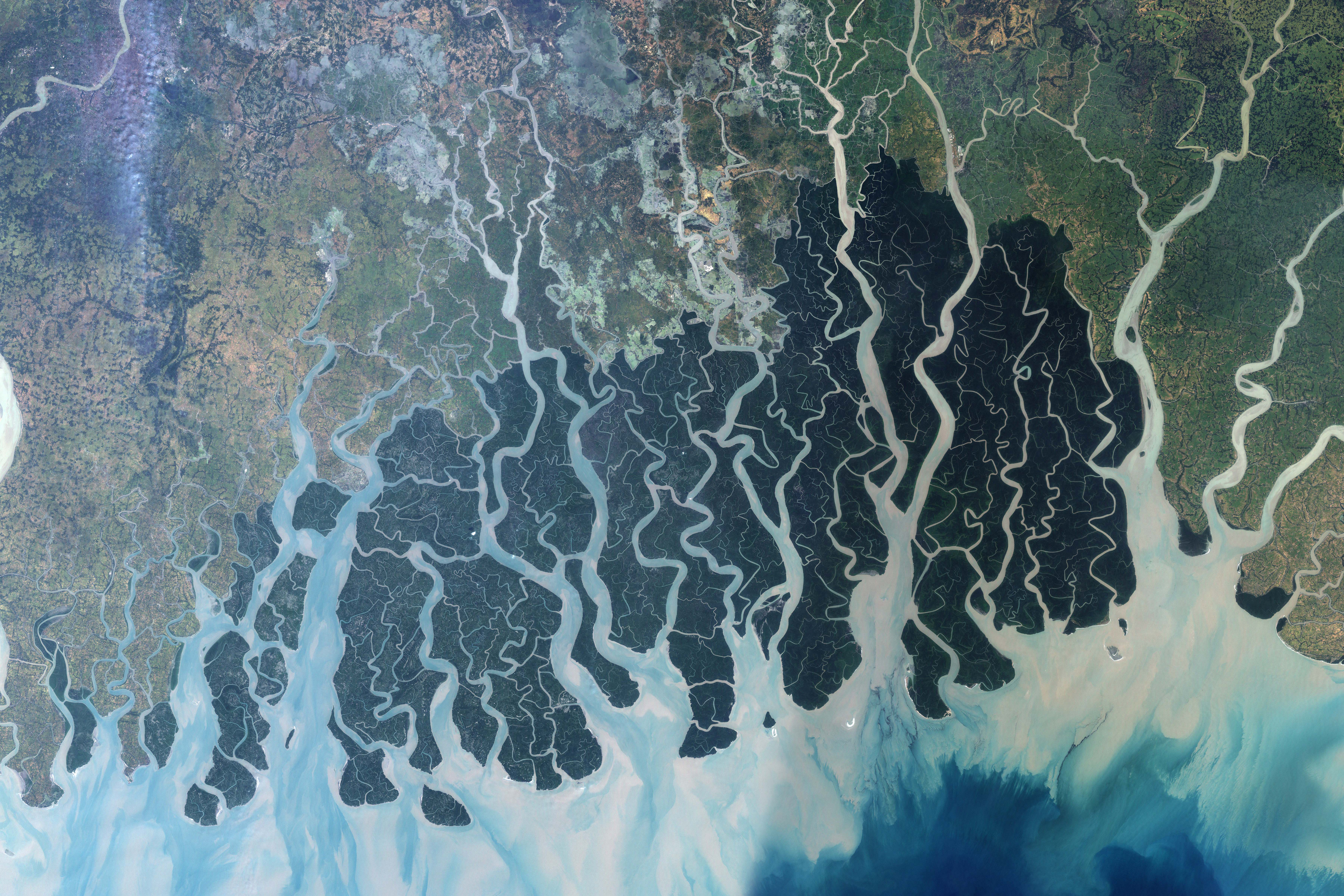
A satellite image of the Sundarbans.

The story is set in India's Sundarbans region. The Sundarbans are located across the western coast of Bangladesh and the south coast of India's Eastern state of West Bengal. The region is characterised by vast natural forests and deltas. At greater than ten-thousand square kilometre, the Sundarbans are the world's largest mangrove forest. They are divided by three main rivers, the Ganga, Brahmaputra, and Meghna, which branch to form a major wetland that discharges into the Bay of Bengal. The Sundarbans are everchanging and composed of thousands of islands, many being uninhabitable. The Sundarbans are a UNESCO World Heritage site with four protected areas being held under reserve forest and wildlife sanctuary. The name Sundarbans comes from the common Mangrove trees which populate the area, known locally as Sundori trees.

The Sundarbans experience extreme environmental conditions including climate catastrophes such as cyclones and flash flooding. This major weather events and climate change has resulted in habitat loss, saltwater intrusion (sea water moving further inland), sea-level rise and the submerging of islands.

The region also experiences social pressures including poverty, illegal immigration, climate refugees, and government oversight. The region has a history of poverty with many locals relying on the shrimp seed industry for income by working as seed collectors in the forests. Fieldwork researcher Annu Jalais notes that the Sundarbans region is sometimes referred to as 'Kolkata's Servant' ('Kolkatar jhi') in reference to the many locals that become servants within the households of Kolkata's wealthy.

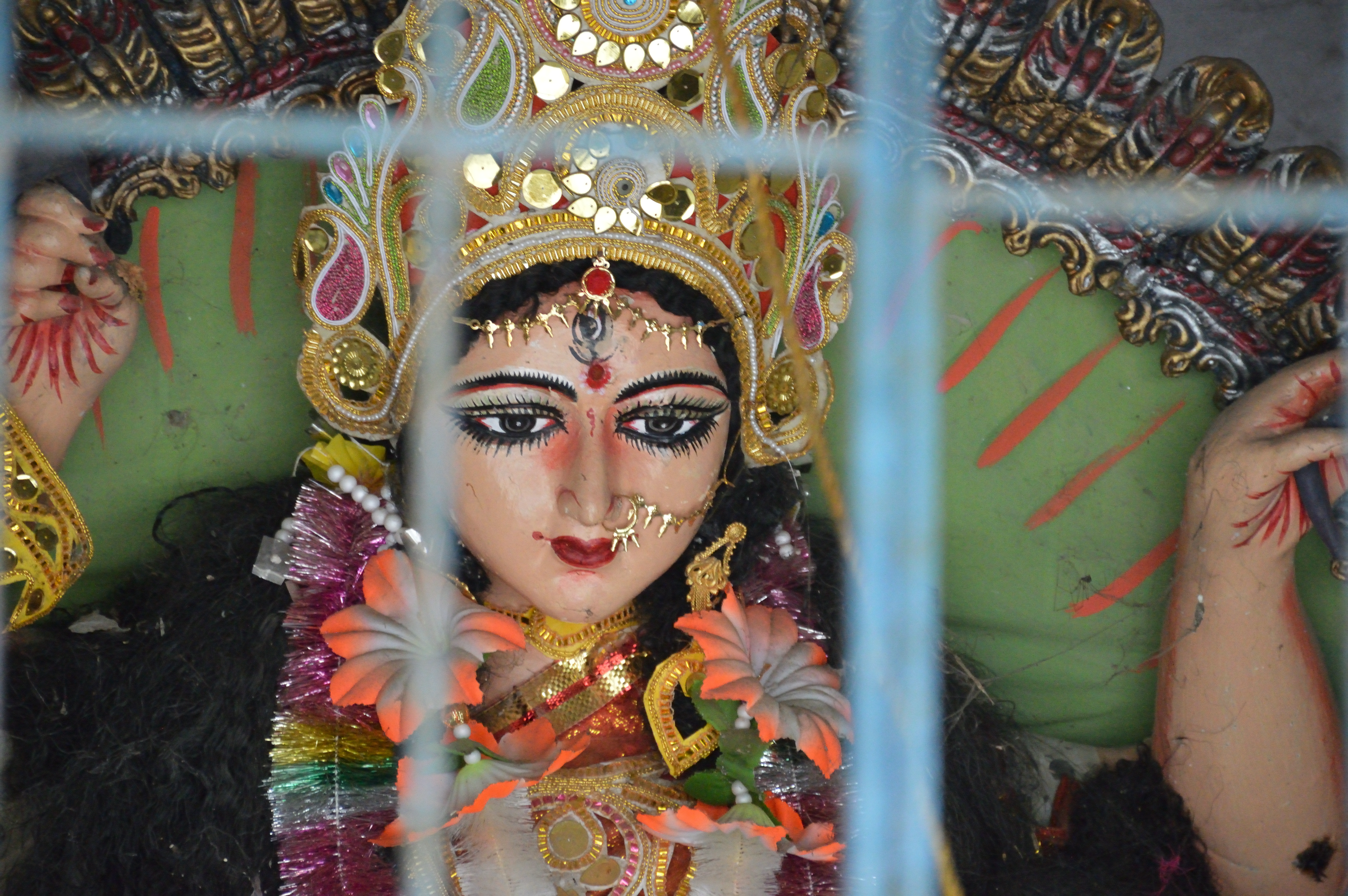
A traditional Bon Bibi idol in West Bengal.

=== The Legend of Bon Bibii ===
Jungle Nama is a retelling of the traditional Bengali folk story of Bon Bibi. The first print version of the legend was produced in the 1800s and was written in a Bengali verse meter called dwipodipayer. Dwipodipayer (the payer cadence) was the primary cadence of Bengali literature during the Middle Ages and is an alteration to the aksharvritta which uses 8/6 syllables. Jungle Nama is a loose reworking of this legend, translated to English and written in a payer-style meter which replicates the flow of the original myth.

=== Fieldwork ===
Ghosh attributes the inspiration of Jungle Nama to a trip he took to a remote Sundarbans Island with a group of local villagers in 2000. Together they travelled on rowboats and performed a Bon Bibi puja (ceremonial worship) on a mudbank next to a fresh set of tiger pawprints.

According to Ghosh, the culture of Sundarbans’ locals places value on maintaining the balance between the needs of the natural world and those of humans. Their practices and belief system emphasise the importance of limiting greed which Ghosh states is an important lesson for the rest of the world in the age of the climate crisis.

== Style ==
The story is written entirely in a poem-like style which replicates the cadence of the original legend. On average, each line has twelve syllables, and each couplet has twenty-four syllables. After each line there is a natural pause or a caesura (a break within the middle of a line).

The book opens with a prologue which describes the geography of the Sundarbans. The story is written in 7 chapters and is followed by an afterword which describes the original legend.

== Characters ==
=== Main characters ===
- Dhona: a wealthy and greedy merchant
- Dukhey: a poor boy living in the village who is related to Dhona
- Dokkhin Rai: a powerful spirit who materialises as a tiger
- Bon Bibi: a kind forest goddess

=== Secondary Characters ===
- Shah Jongoli: Bon Bibi's warrior brother
- Mona: Dhona's equally wealthy but content brother
- Dukhey's mother: a poor and frail women

== Plot ==
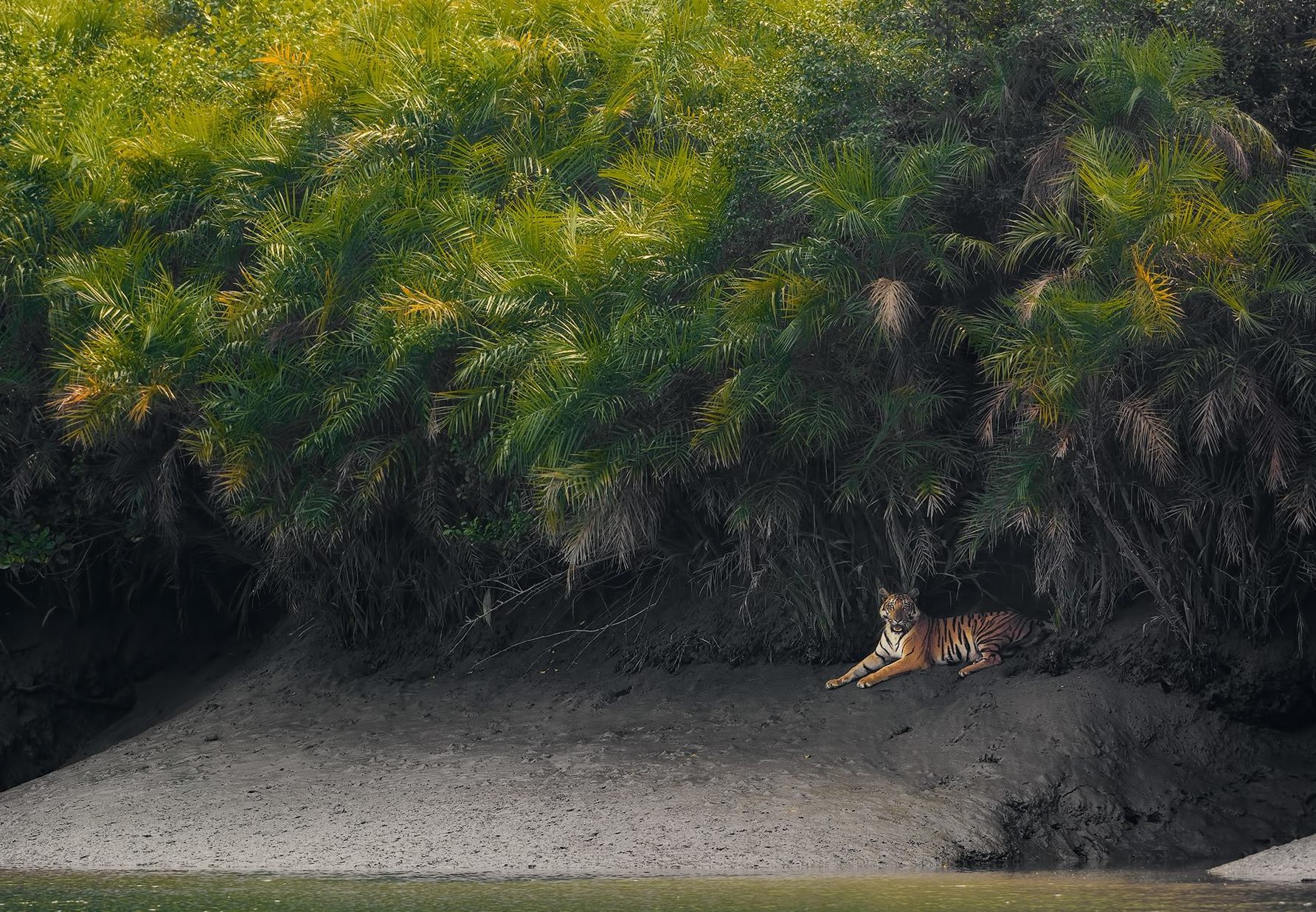
A tiger sitting on the banks of the Sundarban forest.

Long ago the Sundarbans were ruled by Dokkhin Rai, a feared spirit who hunted humans. The locals of the Sundarbans prayed for protection and in response two powerful beings—Bon Bibi, and her brother Shah Jongoli, Muslim victors who had arrived from Arabia—came to their aid. Dokkhin Rai was angered by their arrival and ordered an army of ghosts to destroy them, but Bon Bibi and Shah Jongoli were too strong for the army. Annoyed at his army's performance, Dokkhin Rai accepted he could fight them on his own and transformed into his tiger manifestation to scare them off. However, Bon Bibi and Shah Jongoli fought Dokkhin Rai with immense power and were able to trap him. They drew a line and confined Dokkhin Rai to the jungles of the south, at the border of the ocean and the land, where no human would go.

Much later, Dhona, a rich but greedy merchant, was not content with his wealth so he planned to exploit the southern jungle for honey, wax and wood. His equally wealthy brother Mona urged him against the idea insisting that they already had enough wealth, and that it was not worth facing the tigers of the jungle. Dhona didn't listen and insisted Mona accompany him. Mona refused to go but decided he would help Dhona by acquiring seven ships and a squad of sailors. Mona prepared everything but was short one sailor. After some thought Dhona realised he could get his poor cousin Dukhey to be his final sailor.

Dukhey lived in a hut with his frail mother and had struggled to find work. Dhona visited Dukhey to convince him to work for him. He gave Dukhey some coins for his mother and promised to arrange him a wedding with a beautiful wife. Whilst Dukhey was easily convinced his mother, who knew of Dhona's greed, was more apprehensive and tried to urge Dukhey against it. Dukhey was set on going so she pleaded with Dhona not to take him. In the end, she couldn't change Dhona's mind, but he pledged to protect Dukhey like a son. As Dukhey left home his mother warned him on last time of the dangers of the forest and the tiger Dokkhin Rai and insisted if he was ever in danger to call out a metered rhythmic verse to Bon Bibi.

On the fleet, Dukhey proved to be a successful sailor. When the fleet reached the beginning of the mangroves and entered the jungle there were no resources to seize, leaving Dhona disappointed. The next day Dhona left Dukhey on the boat and went to explore deeper into southern jungle. As soon as they crossed into the invisible line Dokkhin Rai became angered and hungry. Dokkhin Rai began producing illusions of beehives but when Dhona went to open them they were empty. Over the day, Dokkhin Rai continued to play these tricks leaving Dhona confused and upset. To find out what was happening Dhona decided he needed to dream. When he went to sleep Dokkhin Rai entered his mind and scolded Dhona for thinking he could steal from him without providing an offering. Dhona claimed he had nothing to offer but Dokkhin Rai insisted he was wrong declaring he needed to sacrifice Dukhey as a trade for a bounty from the jungle. Dhona resisted and even offered to sacrifice himself, but Dokkhin Rai vowed to sink his fleet if he refused. Reluctantly, Dhona agreed and organised a place to hand over Dukhey and retrieve his bounty.

When Dhona arrived at the meeting point countless hives were brimming with real honey. As promised Dokkhin Rai filled his ships with excessive treasures. Once the crew celebrated their bounty Dhona ordered all but one of his ships to depart leaving only Dukhey and himself. Dukhey was immediately suspicious and questioned how Dhona produced the bounty, but Dhona insisted he has nothing to fear and that they needed supplies, so Dukhey entered the jungle. As soon as he was out of sight Dhona sailed away.

As Dukhey walked further into the jungle Dokkhin Rai appeared in his tiger form. Dukhey remembered his mother's warning and begun calling out to Bon Bibi in the rhythmic verse style. Bon Bibi heard his prayer and arrived with her brother who punched Dokkhin Rai and chased him for days. Meanwhile Bon Bibi took Dukhey back to her home and took care of him. Once Shah Jongoli caught Dokkhin Rai he returned him to Bon Bibi. Dokkhin Rai, exhausted and resentful, swore his loyalty to Bon Bibi and agreed to never hunt a human again. Bon Bibi taught Dokkhin Rai to use syllables and meter to restrain his appetite and ensured he repay his debts to Dukhey with a bounty greater than Dhona's.

When Dhona returned with his bounty the news of his wealth spread quickly and few noticed Dukhey was missing. Dukhey's mother, distressed, asked where her son was but Dhona lied claiming he must have been taken by a tiger. Dhona offered her fine food and fabrics, but Dukhey's mother wept for her son and asserted that riches could not replace him. She wondered if he called out for Bon Bibi and across the sky Bon Bibi heard her, informing Dukhey that his mother was in deep sorrow and that he must return home. As Dukhey left, Bon Bibi emphasised that he must forgive Dhona and not hold onto his resentment.

When Dukhey returned home with his riches he realised he was too late, his mother had died. Once again, he called out for Bon Bibi and his mother awoke. Dukhey forgave Dhona who arranged for his wedding and Dukhey lived happily being content with what he had.

== Major Themes ==
=== Greed ===
A primary theme in the text is greed and its dangers. Ghosh purports that the story of Jungle Nama is about the importance of humans recognising limits and boundaries. Ghosh states that wrote entirely in metered verse as it forces readers to recognise boundaries in their most basic form.

=== Climate Change ===
According to Ghosh the text also explores themes of ecological misadventure which are relevant to the 21st century climate crisis. Ghosh asserts that the story is about preserving the balance nature and the needs and wants of humans. Ghosh has utilised the ancient legend of Bon Bibi as an allegory for the climate crisis. Many traditional stories from Sundarbans locals, including the story of Bon Bibi, and Indigenous people more broadly are about only taking what is necessary from the earth, not damaging the land that you live on and maintain balance. According to literary critic Shreevatsa Nevatia, the text asserts that the Sundarbans are facing the harsh effects of climate change.

Nevatia insist that the character Dhona's desire to pillage the southern forest and retrieve a new bounty is a metaphor for how humans currently treat the earth. In an interview for India Today, Ghosh argues that the story is also an allegory for the way capitalism has caused materialism which has produced the climate crisis which he predicts will end humankind as we know it.

== Explanation of the Title ==
The title Jungle Nama stems from two words, ‘jungle’ which comes from Sanskrit roots and ‘nama’ which is a Persian word meaning ‘narrative’ or ‘relation’.

== Illustrations ==
The graphic book in verse is an assembly of images and text allowing the novel to be both seen and read (2,5) and includes illustrations by New-York based artist Salman Toor. Toor received a Masters of Fine Arts from Pratt Institute in Brooklyn, NY and has work in permanent collections at the Museum of Contemporary Art, Chicago, the Tate, London and the Whitney Museum of American Art, New York. The illustration in the book includes full page drawings, borders around the text, small iconography, and handwritten quotes from the text itself. (4) Apart from the front cover, all illustrations are in black and white.

Ghosh affirms that it was always his intention to collaborate with an artist to provide images to his text. Ghosh prefers to term these illustrations as “illuminations” insisting that the images are not second to the text but rather “throw light upon” it. Toor produced the images for the text within four weeks. He asserts that Toor is an artistic “genius”.

== Reception ==
The book has received a varied reception from critics. Dr Supantha Bhattacharyya, an Associate English Professor, asserted that Ghosh's poetry was “somewhat uneven”, yet the overall story was a well-developed retelling. In positive reviews, critic Shreevatsa Nevatia insisted that Ghosh exhibits much talent as a poet and that his story of the Sundarbans was a “gift that keeps on giving” and Sapna Sanfare stated that Ghosh created magic through his pen.

== Adaptations ==
The author, Amitav Ghosh, stated that he wanted the story to exist in different iliterations. In an interview with India Today Ghosh argues that the human obsession with words is partly responsible for the climate crisis as words tend to focus on the life and culture of humans, neglecting the many other beings that live on Earth. For this reason, Ghosh aimed to produce new forms to discuss climate change, including artwork, music and performance.

=== Audio Book ===
An audio book recording of the novel was produced accompanied with music by Pakistani singer Ali Sethi.

=== Theatrical Performance ===
On March 2 and 3, 2022, the Centre for Experimental Ethnography at the University of Pennsylvania presented a theatrical English stage performance of Ghosh's Jungle Nama with music by Ali Sethi. The performance was directed by Brooke O'Harra and took place at the Montgomery Theatre at Pen Live Arts.
