= The Hungry Tide =

2004 book by Amitav Ghosh

The Hungry Tide(II)
- Author: Amitav Ghosh
- Language: English
- Genre: Novel
- Publisher: HarperCollins
- Publication date: 2005
- Publication place: India
- Media type: Print (hardback)
- Pages: 400
- ISBN: 0-00-714178-5
- OCLC: 59204287

The Hungry Tide (2004) is the fourth novel by Indian author, Amitav Ghosh. Set in the Sundarbans, it follows an unlikely trio who travel up river together to find the rare Irrawaddy dolphin. It won the 2004 Hutch Crossword Book Award for Fiction.

== Synopsis ==
Off the easternmost coast of India, in the Bay of Bengal, lies the immense labyrinth of tiny islands known as the Sundarbans. For settlers here, life is precarious: attacks by deadly tigers are common, and the threat of eviction and consequent social unrest is ever present. Without warning, at any time, tidal floods rise and surge over the land, leaving devastation in their wake. In this place of vengeful beauty, the lives of three people from different worlds collide.

The main character, Piyali Roy, is a young marine biologist of Bengali-Indian descent but identifying as stubbornly American. Raised in Seattle, she studies at the Scripps Institute of Oceanography in La Jolla. She travels to the Sundarbans in search of a rare endangered river dolphin, Orcaella brevirostris. She meets Kanai Dutt, a translator and businessman, on the Kolkata Suburban Railway heading towards Port Canning, on her way to the Sundarbans. Upon her arrival, she hires a boat to look for the dolphins, but her journey begins with a disaster, when she is thrown from a boat into crocodile-infested waters. Rescue comes in the form of an illiterate young fisherman, Fokir. Although they have no language between them, Piya and Fokir are powerfully drawn to each other, sharing an uncanny instinct for the ways of the sea. Piya engages Fokir to help with her research and finds a translator in Kanai, whose idealistic aunt and uncle are longtime settlers in the Sundarbans. As the three of them explore the tidal backwaters, they are drawn unaware into the hidden undercurrents of this isolated world, where political turmoil exacts a personal toll that is every bit as powerful as the ravaging tide.

The Morichjhanpi massacre of 1978–79, when the government of West Bengal forcibly evicted thousands of Bengali refugees who had settled on the island, forms a background for some parts of the novel. The novel explores topics such as humanism and environmentalism, especially when they come into conflict.

== Reception ==
Alfred Hickling gave the book a mixed review in The Guardian, saying describing it as "a Conradian expedition, and a Forster ish collision between western assumptions and Indian reality, which throws in some Indiana Jones-style encounters with tigers and crocodiles" and concluded "Like the elusive appearances of the river dolphins, the pattern of the novel can occasionally seem erratic, but vigilance is rewarded." In The Independent, Krishna Dutta compared the book to Manik Banerjee's The Boatman of Padma and Samaresh Basu's Ganga, but was mixed on Ghosh's attempts to convey Indian cultural and linguistic references to a broad audience.

The novel won the 2004 Crossword Book Prize and was among the final nominees for the 2006 Kiriyama Prize. Saswat S. Das discussed the book as exploring themes of "home" and "homelessness" in a 2006 article in Indian Literature. The book's title was referenced in a 2016 scientific article about climate change in Bangladesh in Climate Change Economics.

== See also ==
- Canning, South 24 Parganas
- Gosaba
- Tiger attacks in the Sundarbans
