= Gazi Pir =

Bengali Muslim saint who lived during the spread of Islam in Bengal

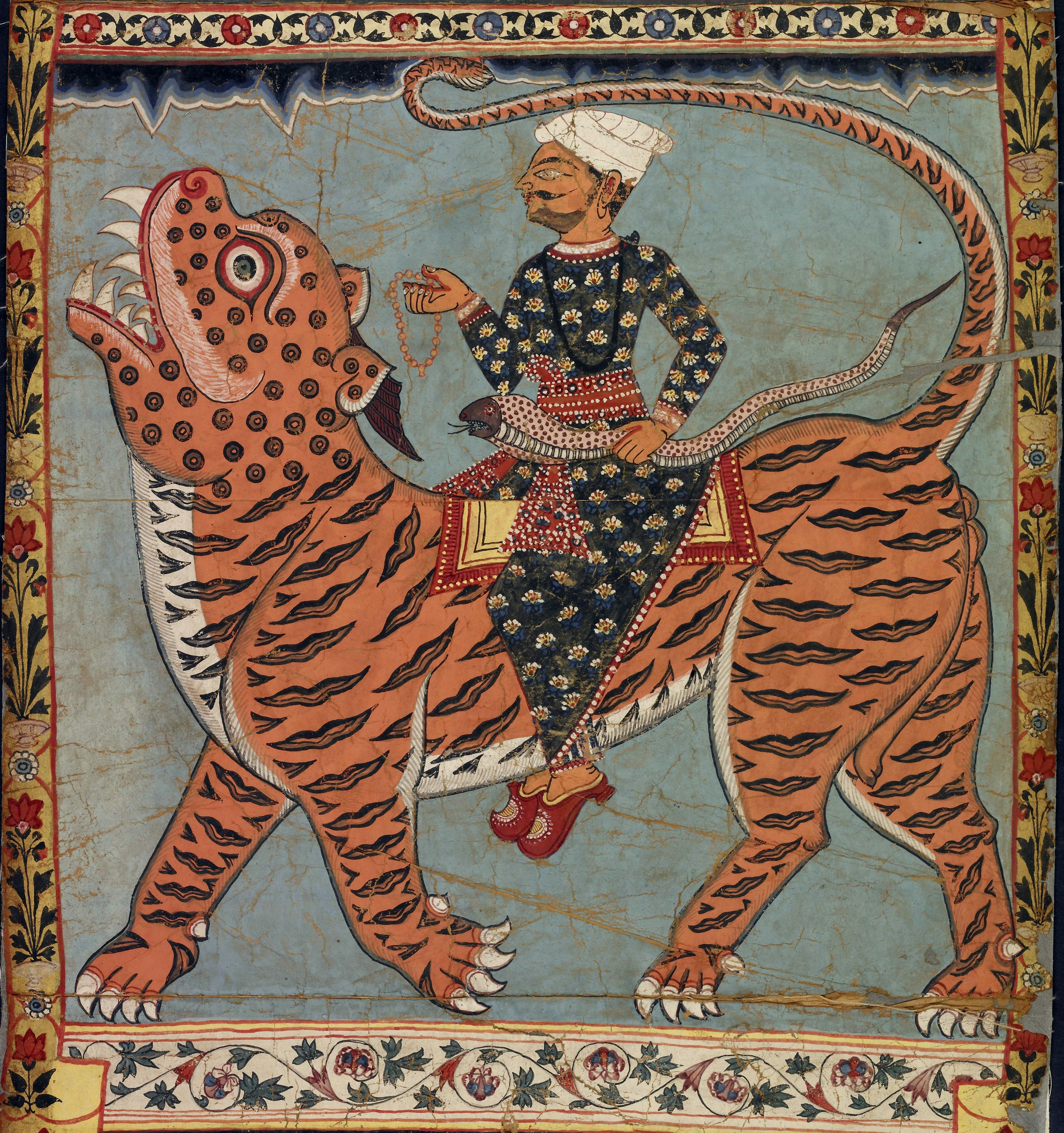
- An image of Pir Gazi and his tiger in the Sundarbans drawn around 1800 CE.

Personal life
- Born: Adampur, Sundarbans
- Resting place: Ghutiary Sharif, West Bengal

Religious life
- Religion: Islam

Gazi Pir (also called Ghazi Pir, Gaji Pir, Barkhan Gaji or Gaji Saheb) was a Bengali Muslim warrior (Ghazi) and pir (warrior saint) who lived in the 12th or 13th century during the spread of Islam in Bengal. He was known for his power over dangerous animals and controlling the natural elements. As the new local Muslim population of southern Bengal were settling in the dense forests of the Ganges delta, these were important qualities. His life is shown on the "Gazi Scroll", a scroll with 54 paintings from circa 1800, which is in the British Museum in London, England.

In the villages of the Sundarbans jungles, Gazi Pir is worshipped alongside the Bonbibi and the Hindu Dakshin Rai, to ask for protection from tigers. According to the legends, Bonbibi taught that everyone is equal, no matter the caste or religion that one has, and that they should live in harmony with nature.

== Kolkata memorial ==
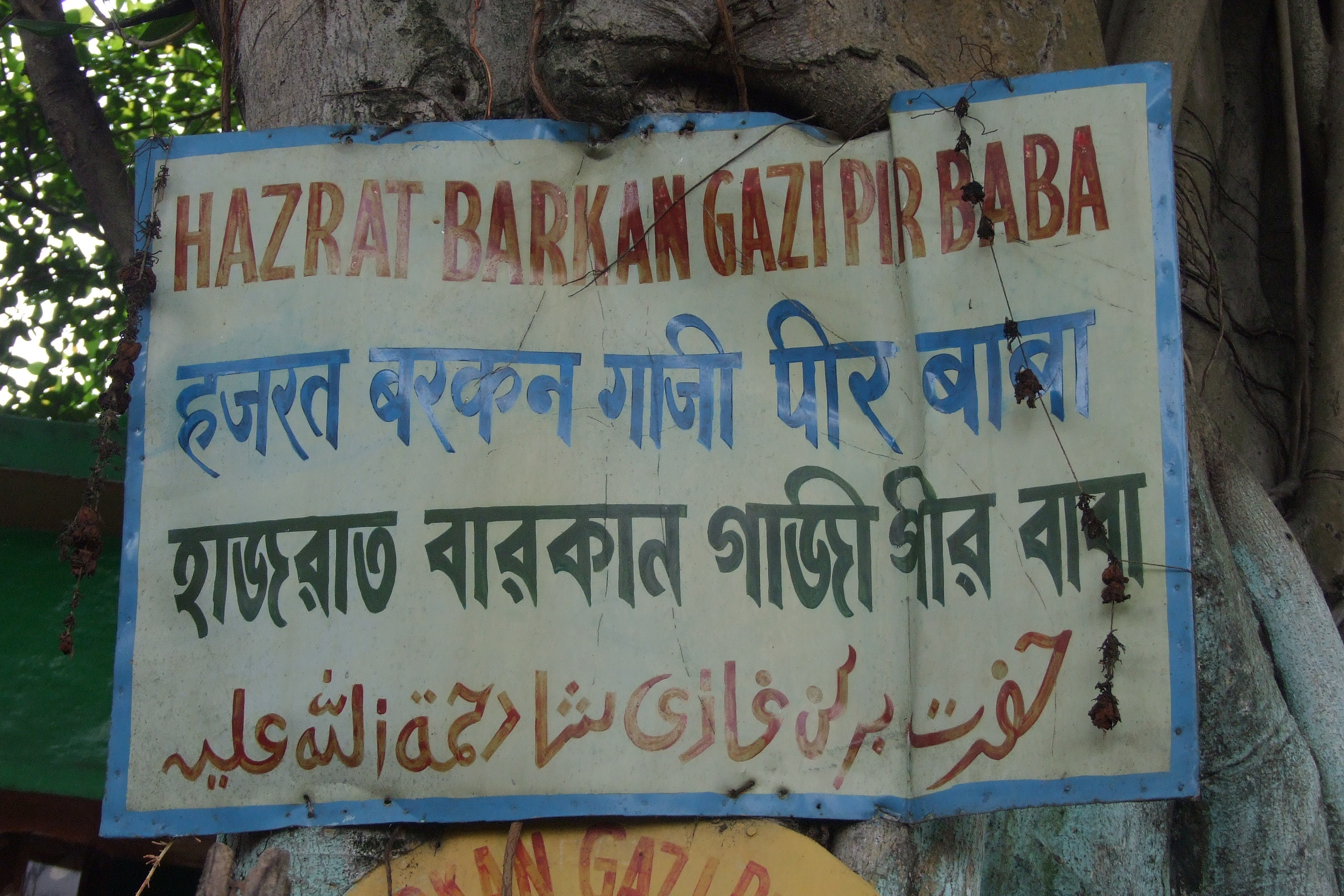
Plate at the shrine in Kolkata.

Rani Rasmani, who created the Dakshineswar Kali Temple in Kolkata in 1847, had a dream in which Gazi Pir told her to build a shrine for him under a peepal tree outside what became the riverside gate of Belur Math in the early 20th century. Ramakrishna Paramahansa used make offerings (sinni) there.
