= Bonbibi =

Guardian spirit venerated by both Hindu and Muslim residents of the Sundarbans, Bengal

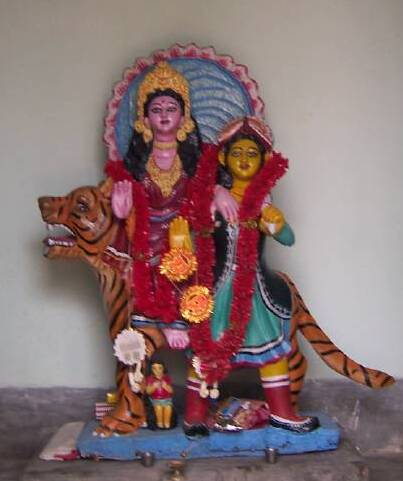
Statue of goddess Bonbibi

Bonbibi, is a legendary lady of the forest, dubbed as a guardian spirit of the forests and venerated by both the Hindu and the Muslim residents of the Sundarbans. She is called upon mostly by the honey-collectors and the woodcutters before entering the forest for protection against the attacks from the tigers. It is believed that the demon king, Dakkhin Rai (or Dakshin Rai; meaning Lord of the South), an arch-enemy of Bonbibi actually appears in the disguise of a tiger and attacks human beings.

== Religious identity and interfaith practices ==
Bonbibi is regarded as a folk Islamic figure, yet her veneration crosses religious boundaries. She is worshipped by both Hindus and Muslims, who participate in shared rituals, recite common mythological narratives, and join together in annual celebrations.

While some scholars have referred to Bonbibi as a forest deity, her cult distinguishes her from classical Hindu forest goddesses such as Bandevi. Unlike Bandevi, Bonbibi is not linked to traditional Hindu iconography and is never worshipped alone. Instead, her presence is contextualized within a broader mythological framework that includes characters such as her brother Shah Jangali, her rival Dakshin Ray, the pious Bar Khan Gazi, and the devout figure Ali Madap.

According to a field study conducted in Namkhana Block, 88% of respondents identified Bonbibi as their saviour during moments of crisis. This group included 56% Hindus and 32% Muslims, indicating her widespread acceptance across religious communities. Her presence in public consciousness tends to intensify after disasters. For instance, after the devastating Cyclone Aila in 2009, many locals expressed gratitude that the destruction was not worse and attributed their survival to the divine protection of Bonbibi.

== Iconography ==
The earliest forms of Bonbibi worship were aniconic, conducted through small earthen mounds known as thān. Over time, visual representations of Bonbibi became more common. These representations, known as chhalan, incorporate both Hindu and Islamic stylistic elements. Her predominantly Hindu images are found as wearing a crown and garland, carrying a club and trishul and her vahana (vehicle) is a tiger. She is venerated by her Muslim followers as Bonbibi and she is known as a pirani. Her predominantly Muslim images are found with braided hair, wearing a cap with a tikli. She wears ghagra and pyjama (instead of a sari) and a pair of shoes.

Importantly, Bonbibi is never depicted alone in iconography. Standard visual groupings typically feature five key figures: Bonbibi herself, her brother Shah Jangali, Bar Khan Gazi, Ali Madap, and Dakshin Ray, who is frequently portrayed as a tiger. These iconographic arrangements vary significantly across local traditions and reflect the fluid creativity of folk imagination rather than adherence to any standardized religious canon.

== Ritual Practices ==
Worship of Bonbibi occurs through both public and private rituals. Public rituals are usually conducted outside the forest, particularly before expeditions and on the first day of the Bengali month of Magh (January–February), which marks a communal celebration of Bonbibi. These ceremonies involve offerings such as batasa (molasses sweets) and shirni (a milk-based dessert), and often include recitations from the Bonbibi Johuranama, also known as the Bonbibir punthi, which is the principal folk text associated with her cult.

Private rituals are more intimate and typically take place within the forest during expeditions. These ceremonies are led by ritual specialists known as Gunin, Faqir, or Baule. These individuals are believed to possess protective powers and are entrusted with reciting mantras to safeguard expedition teams, particularly from the threat of tiger attacks. The mantras employed in these rituals are categorized into three types: Hukumer mantras, which are learned from a preceptor or religious authority; Paona mantras, which are received through dreams or divine visions; and Guner mantras, which are obtained through personal experimentation or gathered from various sources.

Strict codes of ritual purity and cohesion among expedition members are maintained to ensure the success of the rites. These practices include wearing amulets, singing folk songs, and making offerings such as hens, rice, or sweets. Red flags are often placed at forest boundaries as a protective gesture. Hens may be released into the forest as a form of symbolic sacrifice. During these periods, couples abstain from intimacy while the men are away in the forest. Doors are kept open at home, and women avoid wearing sindur as a sign of vulnerability and devotion.

In terms of religious representation, Hindus often construct clay statues of Bonbibi, while Muslims, who typically avoid idol worship, honor her by erecting red flags and placing floral garlands on mounds.

== Festivals and Fairs ==
A major annual celebration dedicated to Bonbibi is the Jatal Puja, observed during the Bengali month of Magh. In the village of Holdia in Joynagar, located in the South 24 Parganas district, a three-day fair has been organized by the Mandal family for approximately 250 years. This longstanding tradition highlights Bonbibi’s integral role in the cultural identity of the region.

Festivities include musical performances, traditional masks, folk plays, and exhibitions of artisanal crafts. Another major festival takes place on January 14 each year. On this day, devotees travel by boat to the edge of the forest where they perform rituals, offer prayers, and organize community celebrations. These include cultural fairs featuring ballads, music, and plays such as Dukher Banabas and Boner Ma Bonbibi. These performances are not merely entertainment but act as vehicles for reinforcing cultural solidarity, environmental awareness, and communal ethics.

== Narratives ==
The narratives of Bonbibi are found in several texts named as the Bonbibir Keramati (the magical deeds of Bonbibi) or the Bonbibir Jahuranama (glory to Bonbibi). Amongst its earliest poets, Bayanuddin and Munshi Mohammad Khater are well known and their texts in the Bengali verse meter known as dwipodi-poyar (the two-footed line) are almost similar and are heavily influenced by Persian and Quranic Arabic. These texts consist of two major episodes, her battle with Dakkhin Rai and the narrative of Dukhe.

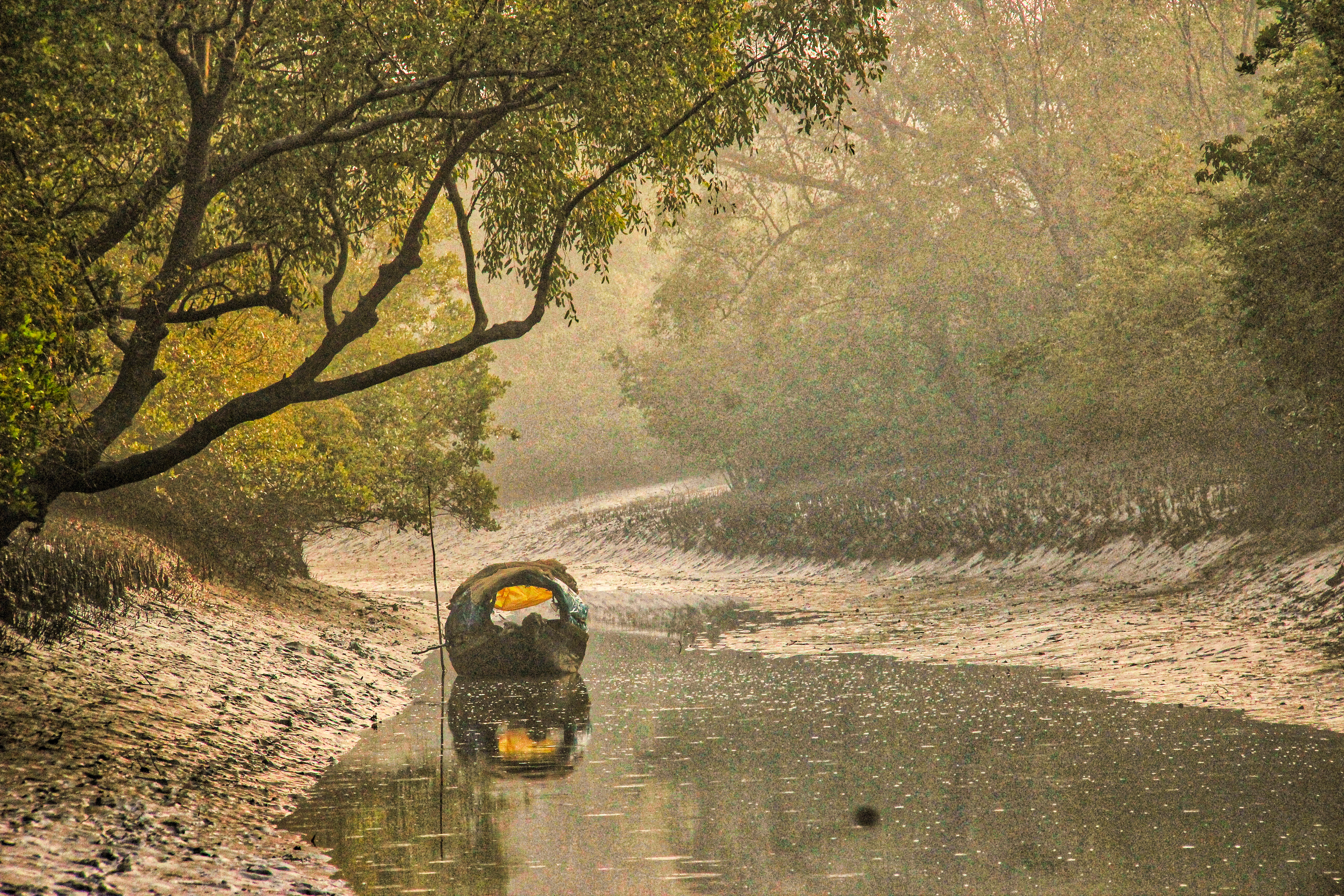
Sundarbans, where the folklore of Bonbibi comes from

In The Hungry Tide, his 2004 environmentalist novel, Amitav Ghosh mentioned two accounts of the Bonbibi story of "Dukhey's Redemption." In River of Fire, Qurratulain Hyder mentions in a footnote that "Ban-Bibi" is Fatima, daughter of Muhammad and she is revered as the patroness of the woods by the forest dwelling Muslims of Bengal.

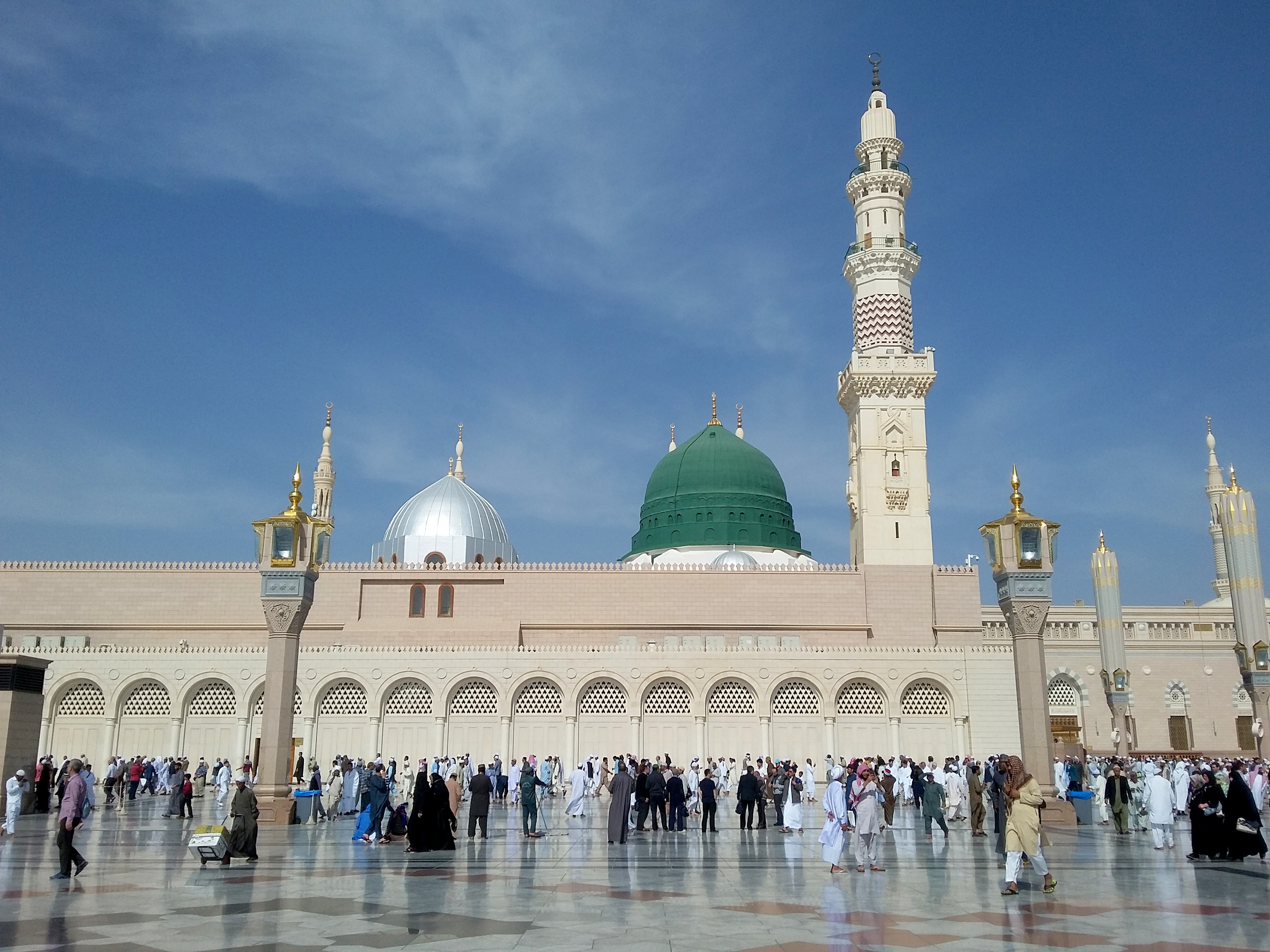
Prophet's mosque, where Bonbibi received her magical hats

=== Battle with Dakkhin Rai ===
Bonbibi is believed as the daughter of Berahim (Ibrahim), a fakir from Mecca. When his first wife Phulbibi could not bear any child, Ibrahim (locally known as Berahim) married Golalbibi with Phulbibi's permission tagged with a condition of fulfilling a wish of her in future. At the same time, God decided to send Bonbibi and Shah Jangali from heaven for a divine mission. He instructed them to take birth as the children of Golalbibi. When Golalbibi became pregnant, Ibrahim left her in a forest to satisfy his first wife's wish, as he promised her earlier. Bonbibi and Shah Jangali were born in the forest to Golalbibi. Allah sent four maids from heaven to take care of them. Golalbibi abandoned Bonbibi in the forest left with Shah Jangali in her arms. Bonbibi was raised in the forest by a doe. After seven years, Ibrahim understood his mistake and took back Golalbibi and her two children to Mecca.

Once, while praying at the mosque of the prophet of Islam, Bonbibi and Shah Jangali received two magical hats. With the help of those magical hats, they flew to the country of eighteen tides (atharo bhatir desh) in Hindustan (but, according to another version of the narrative, they were brought to the country of eighteen tides by Gibril). After reaching there, Shah Jangali gave the adhan (call to prayer). The country of eighteen tides (the Sundarbans) was under the control of the demon king Dakkhin Rai, till their arrival. The sound of adhan reached his ears. He sent his friend Sanatan Rai to enquire about them. When, Sanatan informed him about the duo, he decided to throw them out of his territory. While he was about to go into the battle, his mother Narayani prevented him from going and she herself went with her army of ghosts and goblins to fight them. Bonbibi defeated Narayani after a long battle. But out of mercy, she returned the half of the erstwhile kingdom of Narayani and her son. Narayani became a friend of Bonbibi. While the inhabited part of the Sunderbans is believed as the realm of Bonbibi, Dakkhin Rai is believed as the ruler of the deep forest.

=== Narrative of Dukhe ===
Once, there were two Moule (honey collector) brothers, Dhona and Mona (or Dhanai and Manai) in a village named Barijhati. Dhona planned to go for an expedition with a fleet of seven boats to collect honey in a mahal (dense forest) of the country of the eighteen tides but his brother Mona opposed it. He took a poor shepherd boy, Dukhe along with him. Before leaving, Dukhe's mother told him to remember Bonbibi in case of any serious trouble. When the fleet reached the Kendokhali char, which was a part of the kingdom of Dakkhin Rai, Dhona forgot to give an offering to Dakkhin Rai. As a result, he was not able to collect any honey or wax for three days. On the third night, Dakkhin Rai appeared in Dhona's dreams and asked him for a human sacrifice. After some arguments with Dakkhin Rai, greedy Dhona agreed to sacrifice Dukhe in exchange for honey and wax. So, after collecting enough wax and honey, he left Dukhe there and returned to his village. When Dukhe was about to be killed by Dakkhin Rai in the disguise of a tiger, he started chanting prayers invoking Bonbibi. On hearing his chant, Bonbibi came along with her brother Shah Jangali to save him. Shah Jangali defeated Dakkhin Rai. After his defeat, Dakkhin Rai took refuge with Bara Khan Ghazi (Gazi Pir). Bonbibi and Shah Jangali followed Dakkhin Rai there. Finally, Bara Khan Ghazi was able to convince Bonbibi not to harm Dakkhin Rai. In return, Ghazi gave Dukhe seven carts full of precious items, while Rai gave him a sufficient amount of wax and honey. Bonbibi ordered her pet crocodile, Seko, to drop him to his village. After his return to the village, Dukhe popularised the worship of Bonbibi in the neighbouring areas. Later, Dhona married his daughter Champa to Dukhe, who had become the Chaudhury (chief) of the village.

== Shrines of Bonbibi ==
In most of the shrines of Bonbibi in the Sundarbans, Bonbibi is worshipped along with her brother Shah Jangali and Dakkhin Rai.

== Appearances in literature ==
The story of Bonbibi is prominent in Amitav Ghosh's The Hungry Tide, Jungle Nama and also referred to in the same author's The Great Derangement: Climate Change and the Unthinkable.

== See also ==
- Bangladeshi folk literature
- Gazi Pir
- Jungle Nama (2021 verse adaptation)
