= Satya Pir =

Syncretic belief system in Bengal

Satya Pir (Bengali: সত্যপীর, romanized: sôtyôpīr) is a syncretic belief system created by the fusion of Islam and local religions like Hinduism in Bengal. Experts maintain that the Muslim Satya Pir and the Hindu Satyanarayan essentially represent the same beliefs and rituals.

A century ago, a puja was mainly performed by Hindu women in Bengal and was interchangeably called Satya Pir Puja or Satyanarayan Puja. According to the Indian author Dwijendra Nath Neogi, some Muslims at that time also performed the puja. The author gives theories as to how Pir and Narayan got associated. In one theory, he proposes that Brahmins during the Muslim period of Bengal changed Narayan into Pir in order for the Muslims to believe that they were worshipping an Islamic saint. The other theory says the worship started as that of a Muslim saint, or Pir, and later the Pir was changed into Narayan.

In folklore, Narayan and Pir get mixed such as one supplicant will address him as Satya Narayan, implying that he is an avatar of Vishnu, while another one in a different tale will be told that Satya Pir has just come from Mecca, which would make him Muslim. Satya Pir is also worshipped by some Buddhists in Bangladesh.

In Odisha, the region adjacent to Bengal, Sufism gained popularity and led to the emergence of the Satya Pir tradition. Even today, some Hindus worship Satyanarayan and Pir together.
