= Dakshin Rai =

Deity in the Sundarbans in India and Bangladesh

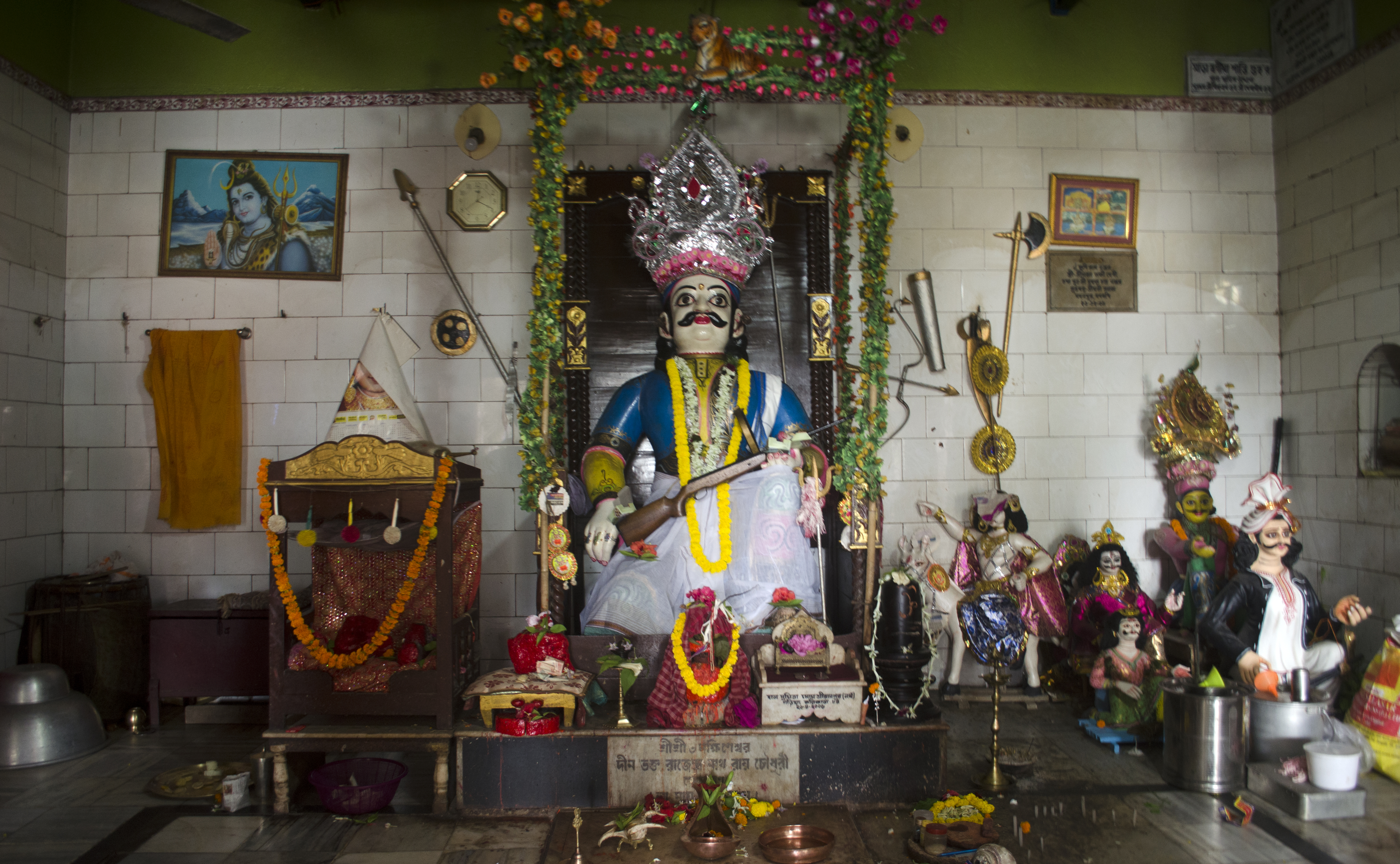
Idol of Dakshin Rai at Dhapdhapi

Dakshin Rai (Bengali: দক্ষিণ রায়, "King of the South") is a revered deity in the Sundarbans in India and Bangladesh who rules over beasts and demons. He is regarded as the overall ruler of the Sundarbans. The deity is worshipped by all those who enter the Sundarban forests of West Bengal, for subsistence, irrespective of their caste, creed or religion.

== Narrative ==
In the Sealdah South lines, there is the station Dhapdhapi. A few miles away is a Dakshin Rai temple. The residents of the area worship this Tiger God. He once belonged to the area of the Sundarbans. His domain stretches from the south Namkhana Kakdwip the Bhagirathi- Hooghly River Ganga in the west to the Ghatal Bakla district in the east as well as Khulna Jessore District of Bangladesh. Every new moon (Amavasya), he is revered and appeased with animal sacrifices. Dakshin Rai also likes music and attracts musicians. The local tribes try their best to please the 'King of the South' by dancing and singing night after night.

Dakshin Rai's father is Prabhakar ray (Danda Baksha muni) a brahmin and mother is Narayani. His father was the ruler of the Sundarban forests. He is depicted with large whiskers. His body is slender and has a shiny, yellow tinge decorated with tiger-like stripes. Drool drips from both sides of his mouth and he has a six-meter-long tail.

Inhabitants of the Sundarbans pray to Dakshin Rai or Bonbibi before venturing into the mangroves, as they believe this affords them protection. Natives of some tribes bind a mask with the face of Dakshin Rai to the back of their heads to confuse or scare an approaching tiger and ward off its attack.
