= In an Antique Land =

1992 book by Amitav Ghosh

In An Antique Land
- Author: Amitav Ghosh
- Language: English
- Genre: Non-fiction
- Publisher: Ravi Dayal Publishers
- Publication date: 1992
- Publication place: India
- Media type: Print (hardback)
- ISBN: 0679727833
- Followed by: Dancing in Cambodia and at Large in Burma

In an Antique Land is a 1992 book written in first-person by Indian writer Amitav Ghosh recounting his experiences in two Egyptian villages attempting to retrace accounts of an unknown Indian slave, as well as a reconstruction of the life of a 12th-century Jewish merchant in the area. It describes a variety of characters, going into great detail regarding their lives and Ghosh's interactions with them.

The book has been noted for its difficulty to categorise in traditional genres and its themes regarding postcolonialism, the possibility of synthesising cultures, and Western knowledge systems, particularly with regards to anthropology. Reception towards the book is generally positive.

== Synopsis ==
The book contains two narratives. The first, an anthropological narrative, revolves around two visits made by Ghosh to two villages in the Nile Delta, while he was writing his doctoral dissertation (1980–81) and again a few years later (1988). In the second narrative, presented parallel to the first one in the book, Ghosh reconstructs the history of a 12th-century Jewish merchant, Abraham Ben Yiju, and his slaves Ashu and Bomma, using documents from the Cairo Geniza.

In an Antique Land begins in the small Egyptian village of Lataifa in 1980, where the then-graduate student Amitav Ghosh writes his doctoral thesis and begins his investigation into the lives of 12th century Jewish merchant Abraham Ben Yiju and Ben Yiju's anonymous Indian slave. Eventually, Ghosh moves to the larger village of Nashawy. He details the numerous people he meets within the town, their lives and relationships, as well as their attempts to convert him to Islam.

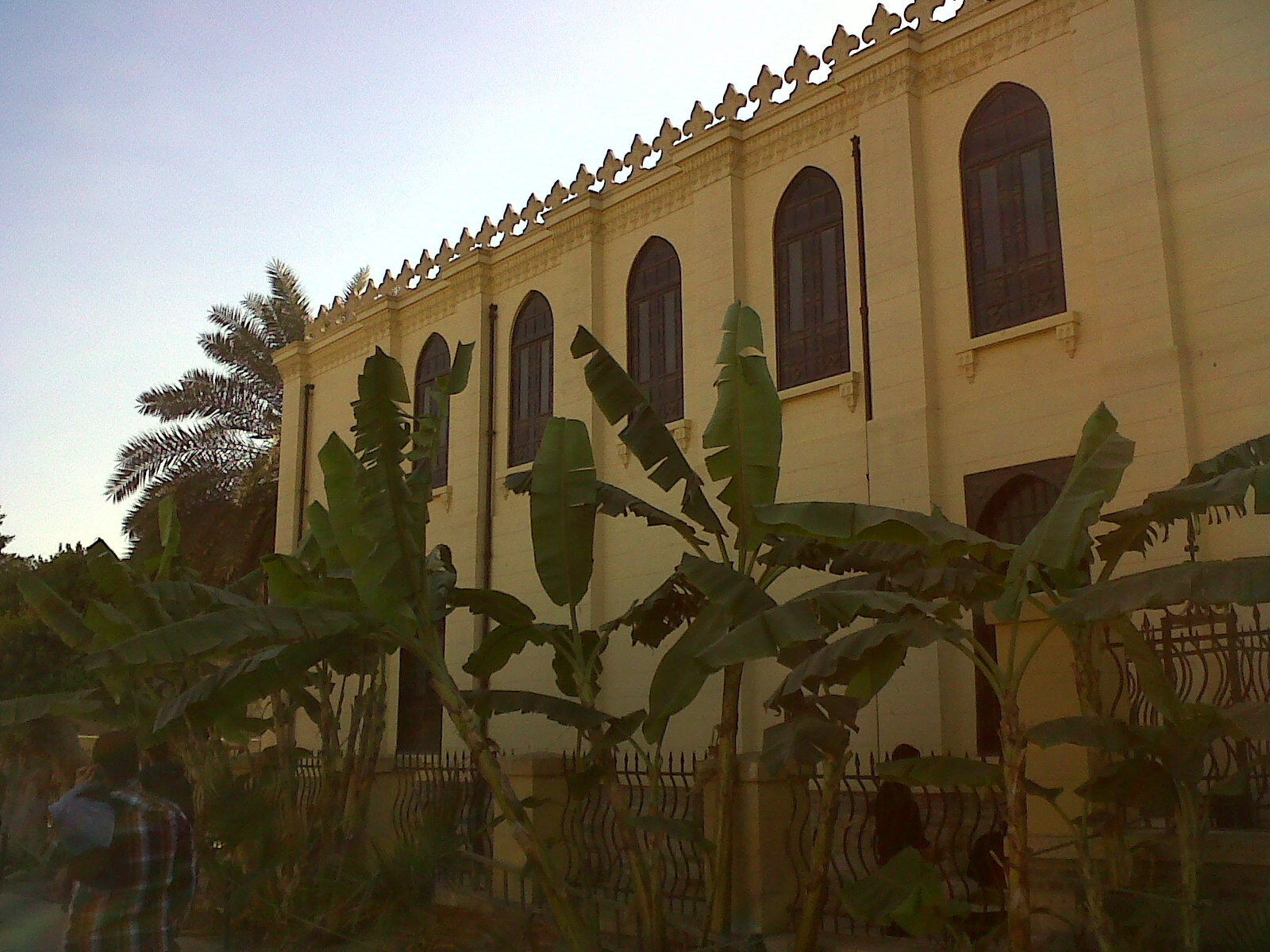
The Ben Ezra Synagogue, in which the documents Ghosh studied were found

Ghosh leaves Egypt in 1981, spending time during the next several years honing his Arabic and learning the dialect Ben Yiju uses in his own documents. In 1988, he returns to the two villages. To Ghosh's relief, this dialect is similar to the spoken language within Lataifa and Nashawy.

Ghosh recounts the series of events that led to a storehouse of documents – dubbed the Cairo Geniza – belonging to Ben Yiju's synagogue being preserved for seven centuries, after which it was brought to the attention of the wider world by a variety of interested scholars. As he studies these documents, Ghosh refamiliarizes himself with the people he met during his first visit, noting many that have left to other countries in order to find work. Ghosh also meets several new people.

His research leads Ghosh to the belief that Ben Yiju fled to India in order to escape a blood feud, freeing and marrying a slave girl named Ashu, eventually traveling back to his homeland years later, then moving back to Egypt. Ghosh investigates the unnamed slave once more, surmising that his name was Bomma and that he acted as an apprentice to Ben Yiju, eventually taking over the merchant's business.

== Characters ==
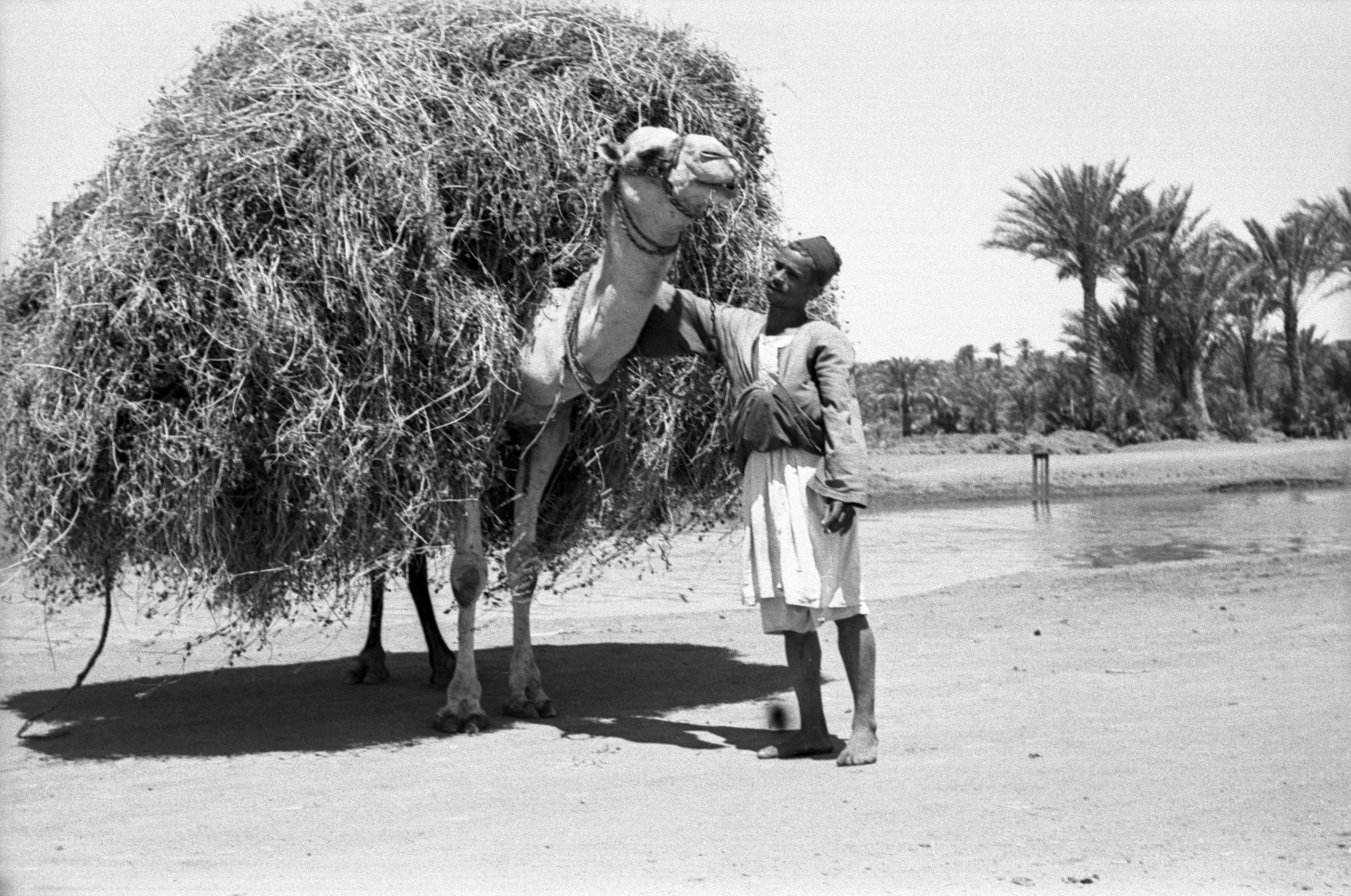
A fellah - the class of farmers that Ghosh spends much of the book interacting with - and a camel.

=== 20th Century ===
Amitav Ghosh - Anthropologist researching his doctoral thesis and tracing the journey of Abraham Ben Yiju and his slaves. The narrator of the story.

Abu-'Ali - Ghosh's initial landlord; obese, unlikeable, and well-off. The owner of a shop that sells government-subsidized goods.

Shaikh Musa - An elderly fellah who befriends Ghosh during his stay. He is kind and companionable, and a font of knowledge for Ghosh's research. His son dies during one of Ghosh's trips to Cairo.

'Amm Taha - The caretaker of the second house Ghosh stays in. He is called 'Uncle' by the villagers, and performs many odd jobs - making him knowledgeable about the lives of many of the villagers.

Ustaz Sabry - A scholar and a teacher, who is greatly respected amongst the villagers for his learning and many arguments about Islam.

Zagloul - A self-admittedly poor weaver, but an excellent storyteller.

Khamees 'the Rat' - A childless fellah, of the Jammal lineage, which had its fortunes improved in the redistribution of land from the Egyptian revolution of 1952. Witty, with a keen sense of humor.

Nabeel - A quiet, contemplative young man usually found in the company of Isma'il. He is a Ministry of Agriculture student who, after his draft, goes to Iraq.

Isma'il - A loquacious young man, usually found in the company of Nabeel. He is a Ministry of Agriculture student who, after his draft, goes to Iraq.

=== 12th Century ===
Abraham Ben Yiju - The Jewish merchant whose life Ghosh attempts to trace. A man with literary leanings who lives a tumultuous life.

Madmun ibn Bundar - A wealthy trader who becomes Ben Yiju's mentor.

== Major Themes ==
=== Postcolonialism ===
Many scholars make note of the postcolonial aspect of In an Antique Land. The book's title is a reference to the opening line of the poem Ozymandias, which was written by an English poet. This serves to put the postcolonial aspects of the story into focus; a decision that Srivastava sees as ironic, given that most of the narrative revolves around Eastern modes of living.

Ghosh's narration often characterizes the inhabitants of Egypt as somewhat innocent, being relatively ignorant of war, violence, and fear, as well as somewhat backwater in their day-to-day household appliances. Smith characterises this as ironic, given that Ghosh, as an Indian, is coming from a postcolonial society. In this characterization, Ghosh bestows upon himself a position of somewhat condescending authority, mimicking the perspective of a colonizer – this operates as a reflection on Ghosh's own position as an interloper within the village. Similarly, Ghosh's access to Ben Yiju's story is reliant upon documents extracted by colonial authorities, a fact which makes Ghosh's role as an anthropologist cruelly ironic. His implication within the colonial narrative puts his identity as an anthropologist and an Indian in sharp contrast.

Ghosh is frequently disparaged or esteemed based on his country's level of development, and finds himself at several moments arguing vehemently for India's technological superiority - a method of ranking that is fundamentally Western, despite the story taking place geographically outside the West. Similarly, in asking an Imam about traditional healing techniques, Ghosh finds him ashamed - ashamed due to Western influence, which made him doubt his own techniques and cling to theirs. This points out how, despite being in Egypt, both the Indian and the Imam are trapped in a world that still describes itself in an oriental fashion.

Gandhi argues that Ghosh's writing of In an Antique Land runs against the Hegelian notion of history, in which history is a grand narrative wherein a culture's development is reflected in how European they seem. Hegel's account, she argues, evaluates ultimate freedom as conformity to a Eurocentric ideals, giving Europeans a moral right to colonise. In contrast, Ghosh's account of colonial activities within In an Antique Land is deeply mournful, describing the taking of historical documents by colonial authorities as “having stolen them from their legitimate cultural inheritors”. Majeed points out that the book is ironic, in that while the medieval is usually an escape from the modern world, Ghosh very clearly links the two eras, making it difficult to forget their connection.

Dixon notes that in the plethora of endnotes to In an Antique Land, not one of them links to a European theorist - a choice that seems to suggest that Ghosh is attempting to shed Western influence. Dixon argues that Ghosh's counterargument to Orientalism - instead of moving towards the idea of an essential human nature - is that the world is composed of a constant crossing of borders, informed by the differences between every culture.

=== Anthropology and Western Academia ===
In an Antique Land is often described as a means through which traditional Western modes of knowledge are questioned. Scholars argue that the fragmentary nature of the story – jumping back and forth between two distinct and seemingly unrelated narratives – challenges the ‘definitiveness of academic discourses’ and asks to what extent the unique culture of the two Egyptian villages can be generalized to the society as a whole – a traditional ethnographical method of acquiring knowledge. This is reflected in how the role of researcher and subject is often reversed: “Ghosh is anthropologized by the locals rather than the other way around”; Ghosh becomes the cultural entity being investigated, becoming the ‘Other’ - an entirely separate, discrete entity - to them. Ghosh's objectivity is put to question by him being the subject of investigation and attempted conversions by the Egyptians - it is impossible for him to be a passive observer of their culture.

The novelistic style of the book is frequently remarked upon for its eschewal of traditional anthropological writing. Srivastava points out this brings to mind works of fiction, which continually reminds the readers that any anthropological text, however academic its writing, is also a reconstruction marked by all the bias and inexactitude that any mode of communication carries. It also runs against the framework ethnography typically uses, in that the book avoids using present-tense, like most ethnographical texts - which portrays the object of study as isolated and unchanging. Instead, Ghosh pushes for an understanding that acknowledges the object of study as constantly changing and engaging with the world. His tracing of the histories of his own sources subverts usual ethnographic ways and is ironically self-reflexive.

Ghosh implicitly idealizes modes of knowledge which, like the fragmentary nature of his story, blur boundaries and defy traditional western binaries – a question visited in his earlier novel The Shadow Lines. Within the book, he esteems cultural beliefs which demarcate connections between deific figures. This is reflected in Ghosh's fragmentary narrative as well as the two villages.

=== Interaction of different cultures ===
In an Antique Land goes into great detail regarding the interaction between Ghosh's Indian identity and the culture of the Egyptian villagers. The ancient narrative which parallels the modern-day one depicts a world in which Jews and Muslims constantly interact - an interconnectedness that defies cultural, ethnic, and religious boundaries. Clifford writes that the dual narratives serve to "make space for a counter-history of modernity", using a two-pronged demonstration to show the complexity and reciprocity of cultural interactions. For Dixon, the rapidly shifting movements of the villagers reads like an allegory for modernity, one which brings attention to the constant interaction between cultures.

However, there is a pessimistic dimension to this component of the story, as the possibility of reconciliation is questioned. Ghosh is detained for being an Indian in a Jewish tomb - implying a firm cultural boundary between the two identities. He runs from a situation which stirs traumatic memories of the Partition of India, which demonstrates that he cannot simply leave his identity and experiences behind. Srivastava writes that this acknowledges the impossibility of smoothing over history. In the 12th century, Ben Yiju struggles to reconnect with his family, implying the victory of borders and boundaries.

== Style ==
In an Antique Land is considered as a difficult work to categorized, wherein two reviewers will often place it in entirely different categories. It is considered to be a stylistically curious book. Written after the success of Ghosh's first two books, The Circle of Reason and The Shadow Lines, and written more than a decade after the dissertation on which the book is based, In an Antique Land defies easy description and has been called "generically indefinable" and could be labelled as "narrative, travel book, autobiographical piece, historical account". Smith writes that the novel has been described as “a traveler’s tale, an (auto)ethnography, an alternative history, a polemic against modernization, the personal account of an anthropologist’s research, and, perhaps less obviously, a novel”. Srivastava calls the book an 'alternate anthropology', and is pushing for a 'more complex literary genre'. Majeed describes the story as being formed of "triangular relationship between historical reconstruction, ethnography, and literary text". The book depicts a factual account of Ghosh's real journey in a subjective manner, reconstructs the ancient Ben Yiju's journey, and contains a wealth of anthropological details unusual in a straightforward novel.

However, simultaneously In an Antique Land snubs traditional ethnographical traditions by intimately describing the narrator's own fallible nature, such as going into great detail about Ghosh being assisted in cartography by local children, instead of characterizing himself as the omniscient third-person narrator that is traditional in ethnographies. He also uses ‘Prologue’ and ‘Epilogue’ to title the first and final chapters, instead of ‘Preface’ and ‘Afterword’, which is more traditional in ethnographies. It contrasts with his doctoral thesis - which is written about rural Egyptian village life - in that it eschews present-tense in favor of narrative past-tense; the former of which pushes readers to view its contents as a constant, unchanging truth.

Smith argues that In an Antique Land is a novel in the sense that it portrays its protagonist's struggle to overcome internal conflicts – in this case Ghosh's feelings regarding colonialism and Ghosh's own role in it. Srivastava points out that the opening lines of the book are written in a novelistic style - marking it in the reader's mind as a novel and encouraging them to read and interpret it according to their own understanding of what is a novel. However, Kitely argues out that compared to other books, Ghosh goes out of his way to portray characters not as allegories for greater events, but rather as individuals living out their lives.

In an Antique Land is also remarked upon for how readily it points out issues in translating from one language to another; in this case, from the villager's Arabic to the English in which the book is written. Ghosh recounts several moments where he cannot effectively communicate what he wants to due to the limits of the Arabic language. An example scholars touch upon often is a scene in which Ghosh attempts to convey that many Indian men are uncircumcised, which literally means impure in Arabic. Ghosh, without any other means of expressing his thoughts, is forced to admit that many Indian men are ‘impure’. He is forced to admit many women are impure in similar circumstances.

Dixon writes that much of In an Antique Land's style is similar to that of other Subaltern Studies academics in that it gives various situations that can be interpreted as extended metaphors, which is a clear movement away from traditional Western academic forms of writing. His mixing of human essentialist and post-structural terminology suggests that Ghosh wishes a fusion between traditional academia and the more modern style he's pursuing, or is at least bringing attention to his own role in traditional academia, in a kind of ironically self-aware way.

The moment-to-moment style of the book is often extremely descriptive, going into great detail about the texture of produce and the mud beneath the narrator's feet. Majeed points out that the effect this portrays Ghosh's surroundings as a kind of low-culture, "farcical shadowing the grand narratives of history".

Kitely argues that the unique, 'genre busting' style is because of predominately political reasons. A travel book would imply the target audience is someone for whom Egypt would be foreign - alienating potential readers and possibly making its characters overly-exotic, which would seemingly be a colonial move, and a traditional anthropological work would depersonalize what is, to Ghosh, a deeply personal story.

In an interview, Ghosh describes the narrative structure of In an Antique Land as similar to a double helix, wherein events in both the 12th and 20th century are presented linearly, despite neither of truly interacting.

== Background ==
Ghosh's original visit to Egypt in 1980 was to write his doctoral thesis for Oxford University, titled "Kinship in Relation to the Economic and Social Organisation of an Egyptian Village Community". Srivastava remarks upon it for being written in a radically different style to In an Antique Land, with the thesis often making broad, universal claims, the source of these claims often being individual encounters or events that are retold in the book's more temporal style, which forefronts the way in which his own presence alters events.

The events pertaining to Ben Yiju's and his slave are originally reconstructed in Ghosh's historical reconstruction "The Slave of M.S H.6", which was published in the seventh Subaltern Studies. The study explains the possible historical implications of their relationship.

== Reception ==
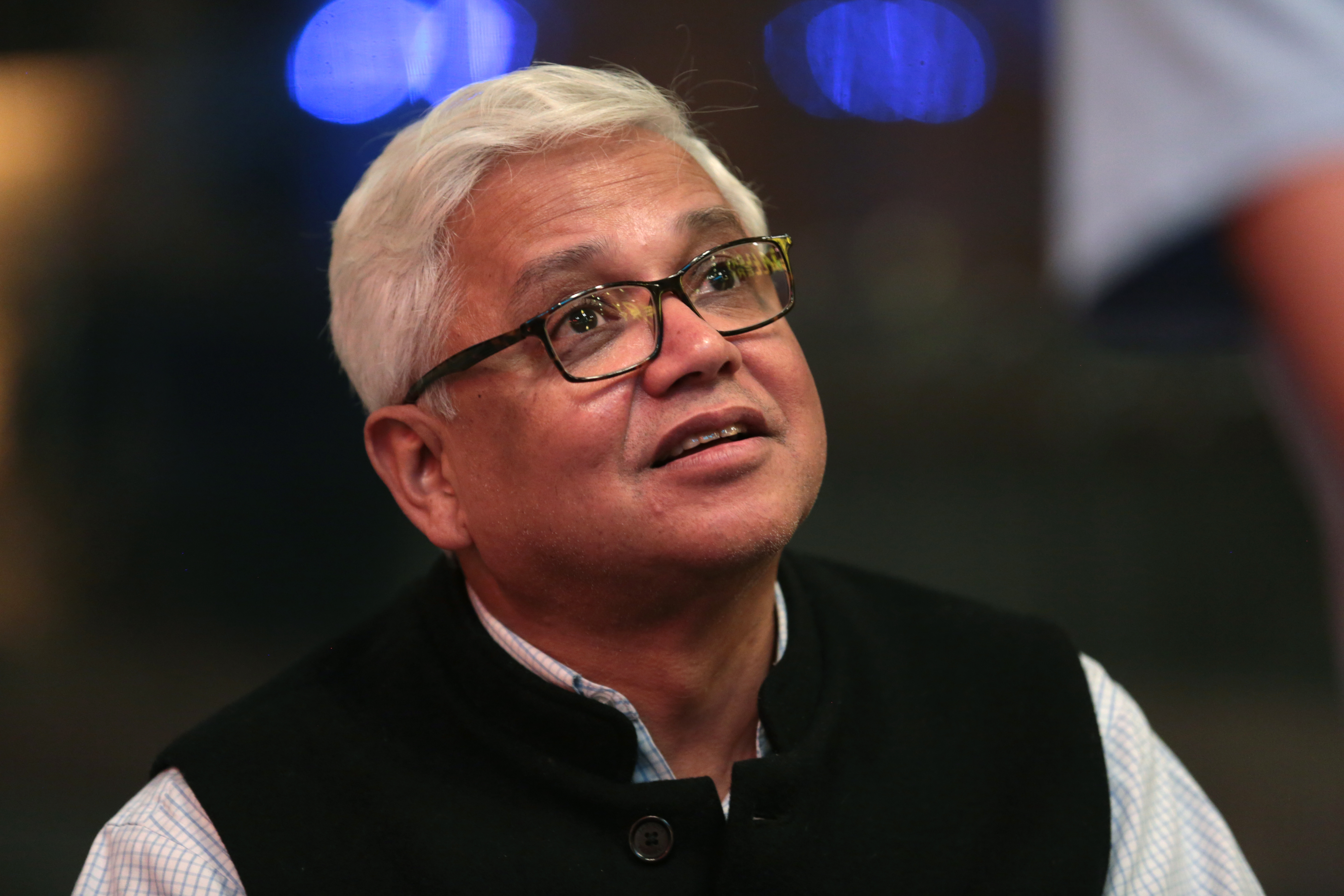
An older Amitav Ghosh at a book signing event.

In an Antique Land received favorable reception upon release. Lal described the book as establishing Ghosh as “one of the most gifted and nuanced writers anywhere in the world today”, characterizing the work as a noble enterprise to give a name to the anonymous, while also being a commentary on how history may swallow individuals arbitrarily. Clifford calls it "poignant, tragic, and sometimes hilarious", and that it "makes space for a counter-history of modernity", claiming it is a complex, well-written book with the question of cultural coexistence at its core.

However, Majeed launches a stern critique of Ghosh's political accomplishments in the book, describing it as failing to find solutions to the problems it presents with the modern identity, seemingly failing at reconciling his own identity. He also describes Ghosh's persona in the book as seemingly separate and standoffish from the people he is studying, and argues that the style of the book - which often has extended descriptions where Ghosh's presence is unfelt - only reinforces his separation from his surroundings. Srivastava specifically attacks this description of Ghosh as standoffish, instead claiming that Ghosh is seeking to open a dialogue with the villagers despite their differences.
