= The Circle of Reason =

The Circle of Reason may refer to:

- The Circle of Reason (society), an American society promoting pluralistic rationalism
- The Circle of Reason (novel), a 1986 novel by Amitav Ghosh
