= The Shadow Lines =

1988 novel by Amitav Ghosh

- First edition
- Author: Amitav Ghosh
- Language: English
- Genre: Fiction
- Publisher: Ravi Dayal Publishers
- Publication date: 1988
- Publication place: India
- Media type: Print (hardback)
- Pages: 256
- ISBN: 81-7530-043-4
- Preceded by: The Circle of Reason
- Followed by: The Calcutta Chromosome

The Shadow Lines (1988) is a Sahitya Akademi Award-winning novel by Indian writer Amitav Ghosh. It is a book that captures perspective of time and events, of lines that bring people together and hold them apart; lines that are clearly visible from one perspective and nonexistent from another; lines that exist in the memory of one, and therefore in another's imagination. A narrative built out of an intricate, constantly crisscrossing web of memories of many people, it never pretends to tell a story. Instead, it invites the reader to invent one, out of the memories of those involved, memories that hold mirrors of differing shades to the same experience.

The novel is set against the backdrop of historical events like the Swadeshi movement, Second World War, Partition of India and communal riots of 1963–1964 in Calcutta and East Pakistan.

The novel earned Ghosh the 1989 Sahitya Akademi Award for English, by the Sahitya Akademi, India's National Academy of Letters. The novel was translated by Shalini Topiwala into Gujarati In 1998.

== Plot summary ==
Split into two parts ('Going Away' and 'Coming Home'), the novel follows the life of a young boy growing up in Calcutta, who is educated in Delhi and then follows with the experiences he has in London.

His family – the Datta-Chaudhuris - and the Price family in London are linked by the friendship between their respective patriarchs – Justice Datta-Chaudhuri and Lionel Tresawsen. The narrator adores Tridib, his cousin uncle, because of his tremendous knowledge and his perspective of the incidents and places. Tha'mma thinks that Tridib is the type of person who seems 'determined to waste his life in idle self-indulgence', one who refuses to use his family connections to establish a career. Unlike his grandmother, the narrator loves listening to Tridib.

For the narrator, Tridib's lore is very different from the collection of facts and figures. The narrator is sexually attracted to his cousin Ila but his feelings are passive. He never expresses his feelings to her afraid to lose the relationship that exists between them. However, one day he involuntarily shows his feelings when she, unaware of his feelings for her, undresses in front of him. She feels sorry for him but immediately abandons him to visit Nick's (the Price family's son, and the man who she later marries) bedroom. Tha'mma does not like Ila; she continually asks the narrator "Why do you always speak for that whore?" Tha'mma has a dreadful past and wants to reunite her family and goes to Dhaka to bring back her uncle. Tridib is in love with May and sacrificed his life to rescue her from mobs in the communal riots of 1963–64 in Dhaka.

== Characters ==
- Narrator – The protagonist is a middle class boy who grows up in a middle-class family.
- Tridib – The enigmatic cousin of the narrator, Tridib is the son of the narrator's great aunt, Mayadebi. He enjoys telling tales to the narrator and other local boys in Calcutta. He is in love with May.
- Tha'mma (the narrator's grandmother) – She was the headmistress of a girls' school in Calcutta. She is a very strict, disciplined, hard-working, mentally strong and patient lady. She is the one who wants to bring her uncle, Jethamoshai, to India to live with her, eventually leading to his and Tridib's deaths by a mob in Dhaka.
- Ila – She is the narrator's cousin who lives in Stockwell, London. The narrator is in love with her, but she marries Nick.
- May – She is the Price family's daughter. She is in love with Tridib and blames herself for his death.
- Nick – He is the Price family's son, distinguishable by his long blond hair. He wants to work in the 'futures industry'. He marries Ila during the course of the novel, but it is later found that he is allegedly having an affair. He worked in Kuwait for a brief period of time but quit his job (it is implied that he may have been fired for embezzlement).
- Mayadebi – She is the narrator's grandmother's younger sister and Tridib's mother.

== The Educational Edition ==
The Shadow Lines: Educational Edition is a second version of the original novel first published by the Oxford University Press in 1995 and written by the same author Amitav Ghosh. The book comes with the original novel and 4 critical essays which describe and explain the meaning of the novel.

The main point of the new edition is to help students and university undergraduates in understanding the novel and its meaning. The 4 critical essays in the book are as follows:

- "Maps and Mirrors: Co-ordinates of Meaning in The Shadow Lines", written by Meenakshi Mukherjee.
- "Separation Anxiety: Growing up Inter/National in The Shadow Lines", written by Suvir Kaul.
- "The Division of Experience in The Shadow Lines", written by Rajeswari Sunder Rajan.
- "A Reading of The Shadow Lines", written by A. N. Kaul.

== Awards ==
- The Shadow Lines won the Sahitya Akademi Award & the Ananda Puraskar.
