= The Nutmeg's Curse =

2021 non-fiction book by Amitav Ghosh

The Nutmeg's Curse: Parables for a Planet in Crisis
- First US edition (publ. University of Chicago Press)
- Author: Amitav Ghosh
- Language: English
- Publication date: 2021

The Nutmeg's Curse: Parables for a Planet in Crisis is a 2021 non-fiction book by Amitav Ghosh. It discusses colonialism and environmental issues with particular focus on the Banda Islands. European powers took control of land, people, and natural resources for profit. It uses the history of the nutmeg trade as the main example to learn how this has continued to shape the modern world. It is Ghosh's second non-fiction work to discuss climate change, after The Great Derangement: Climate Change and the Unthinkable (2016).

== Background ==
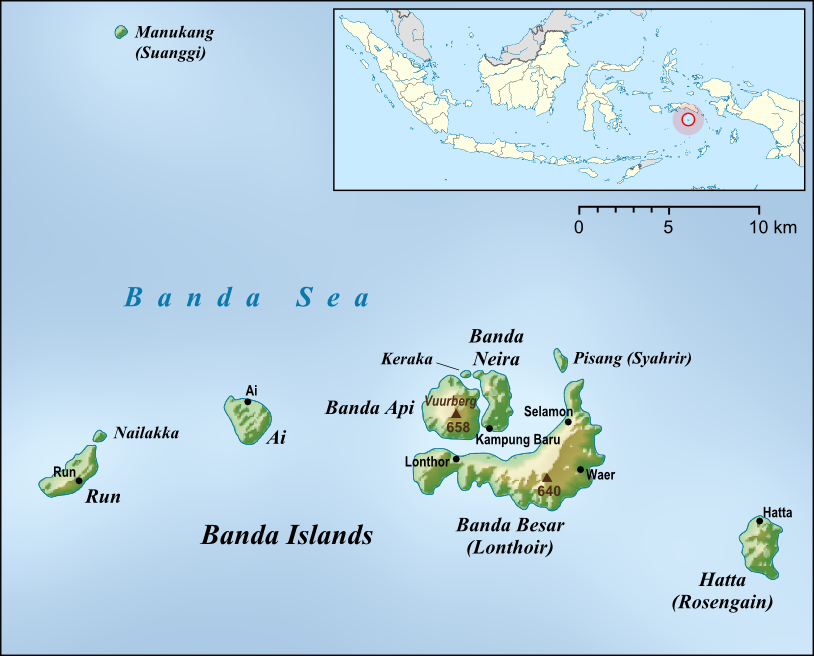
The Banda Islands, which Ghosh travelled to in 2016.

Ghosh had begun writing The Nutmeg's Curse in March 2020. At the time, Ghosh was staying in his Brooklyn home during the COVID-19 pandemic in New York City. This book builds on his earlier work on climate change, mainly The Great Derangement.

The Nutmeg's Curse was inspired by Ghosh's trip to the Banda Islands and his discovery of an online PDF copy of an obscure book that recounted the massacre of the Bandanese. The text was entitled De vestiging van het Nederlandsche gezag over de Banda-eilanden (1599-1621) (English: The Establishment of Dutch Rule Over the Banda Islands), and its author was J.A. van der Chijs. What particularly struck Ghosh was an aspect of the conquest of the Banda Islands, which had taken place in the village of Selamon on Banda Besar Island. On 21 April 1621, Maarten Sonck, a former tax official, was commissioned by the Dutch East India Company (VOC) to destroy the aforementioned village. When a lamp fell to the floor in the meeting room called "bale-bale", where the Dutch were staying, causing a fire, Sonck panicked, thinking that this was a signal of the local population's revolt against the colonisers. The reaction of the Dutch was terrible. They started shooting in the dark, massacring, dismembering and torturing the natives.

== Synopsis ==
The Nutmeg's Curse focuses on the conquest of the Banda Islands, which in the 1600's was the only source of nutmeg. In the 1600's the Dutch East India Company imposed extreme violence on the islands with goal of control. This includes the massacre of the Bandanese people in 1621. Ghosh touches on how this was not just about money, it was a way of thinking that viewed humans and nature as objects that could be controlled and exploited.

He uses this as an analogy to discuss climate change and contemporary environmental issues.This book brings together the idea that this "spice war" about nutmeg is to our dependence on fossil fuels like oil and coal in modern times. Ghosh argues that we have a "curse" of resources referring to valuable resources like nutmeg in the book or oil in todays world. As it talks about in the article The Resource Curse, Colonialism, And The Hypocrisy Of Western "Climate Leadership" : "The resource curse, or the paradox of plenty, posits that resource-rich countries often do worse economically, have reduced human rights outcomes, and are more apt to authoritarianism and conflict". It can lead to violence, war, and environmental destruction for the humans who live near those resources.

== Reception ==
Andrea Wulf described it as a "strange book, but not in a bad way" in a review for the Financial Times, saying it is "meandering and looping". Although Wulf said Ghosh's ideas were not new, she praised it, saying "the simplicity of his main argument and the power of his storytelling that makes the book work."
