= Abraham Ben Yiju =

Jewish merchant and poet

Abraham Bin Yijū (Arabic:إبراهيم بن ييجو) was a Jewish merchant and poet born in Ifriqiya, in what is now Tunisia, around 1100. He is known from surviving correspondence between him and others in the Cairo Geniza fragments.

== Early life ==
Abraham's father was a rabbi named Peraḥyā. His other known children are the sons Mubashshir and Yūsuf, and a daughter, Berākhā. Since Abraham is sometimes given the epithet al-Mahdawī, it is thought that he was born or raised in Mahdia.

By some time in the 1120s, Abraham had travelled the caravan route from Tunisia to Cairo, carrying letters of introduction from his father to prominent Jewish traders of the city. Through them, he found a junior position and small partnerships. He then moved to Aden, where he seems to have gained the mentorship and later business partnership of the nagīd (merchants' chief representative), Maḍmūn ibn al-Hasan ibn Bundār. It was presumably also here that he met his later Aden correspondents Yūsuf Ben Abraham (a trader and judicial functionary) and the merchant Khalaf ibn Isḥāq, along with Maḍmūn's brother-in-law Abū-Zikrī Judah ha-Kohen Sijilmāsī and Abū-Zikrī's brother-in-law Maḥrūz.

== Career in India ==
By 1132, Abraham had moved to the trading port of Mangalore in the region of India then known to Arab traders as Malabar. A hint in a fragmentary letter from Maḍmūn to Abraham suggests that Abraham had got into difficulties with a king in Aden and that these difficulties had made his move to India expedient.

The earliest securely datable records of Abraham's life in India are a deed of manumission recording that he freed a female slave called Ashu on 17 October 1132, with a second document confirming this. By 1135, Maḍmūn is recorded sending a gift of coral for Abraham's son Surūr, attesting that Abraham had a son by this time. Shelomo Dov Goitein inferred accordingly that Ashu had become Abraham's wife and was Surūr's mother. At any rate, other correspondence indicates that Abraham had a brother-in-law called Nāīr, which is thought to indicate the membership of Abraham's wife's family in the Nair community of south-west India. At an undated point, Abraham also had a daughter, Sitt al-Dār.

Correspondence from Maḍmūn to Abraham indicates that while Abraham lived in Mangalore, he had a slave who acted as his agent on voyages back to Aden. His name is recorded only in the Hebrew characters במת (bet, mem, taw), which Amitav Ghosh has interpreted as the Tulu name Bomma, guessed to originate as a diminutive of the deity-name Berme. He is recorded as acting on Abraham's behalf in Aden in 1135. Abraham also developed close relationships with other South Asian traders.

Goods traded by Abraham to Aden include cardamom, a delivery of which was the subject of some dispute in the surviving correspondence between Abraham and both Yūsuf ibn Abraham and Khalaf ibn Isḥāq, areca nuts, pepper, and manufactured goods such as locks and brass bowls. His activities in Mangalore took him to the neighbouring towns of Budfattan (possibly Baliapatam), Fandarīna (Pantalayini Kollam), Dahfattan (Dharmadam) and Jurbattan (Sreekandapuram).

In 1145, Abraham wrote to Abū-Zikrī on behalf of Abū-Zikrī's brother-in-law Maḥrūz to facilitate Abū-Zikrī's escape from Gujarat, where he had been left after being kidnapped by pirates, to Malabar.

== Return to the Middle East ==
The 1140s also saw Abraham seeking to correspond with his brothers Mubashshir (then in Messina, Sicily) and Yūsuf (then in Mazzara, also in Sicily), and a letter to them of 11 September 1149 indicates that he had by then returned to Aden. The letter expresses his desire to reunite his family in Aden, to use his wealth to ameliorate their hardship, and to marry his son to one of his nieces. The letter reached Mubashshir, who did not show it to Yūsuf, but made his way to Aden, where he proceeded to defraud Abraham of, in Abraham's words, 'a thousand dinars'. Around this time, Abraham's son Surūr died and Abraham moved inland to Dhū Jibla, becoming a senior figure in the community there and leaving his daughter Sitt in Aden with Khalaf ibn Isḥāq.

After three years, Khalaf asked for Abraham's permission for Sitt to marry one of Khalaf's sons, but Abraham refused, moved with her to Egypt, and instead wrote to his brother Yūsuf requesting that he give one of his sons or a son of their sister Berākhā to Sitt in marriage. It appears that Bomma followed Abraham from India to Cairo, where Abraham recorded that he owed Bomma money in his accounts.

Yūsuf's eldest son, Surūr, hastened to Egypt to contract the marriage. Surūr's younger brother Moshe followed soon after; he was kidnapped by pirates and taken to Tyre but was freed and met his brother in Egypt. Surūr married Sitt in Fustat in 1156. The two brothers went on to become judges in the rabbinical courts in Egypt.

Nothing is known of the life of Abraham Ben Yijū thereafter.

== Works ==
Abraham's poetry includes an elegy on the death of Maḍmūn ibn al-Hasan ibn Bundār in 1151.

== Appearances in modern literature ==
A major part of In an Antique Land by the Indian writer Amitav Ghosh is devoted to Abraham Ben Yiju, and his slaves Ashu and Bomma, a fictional narrative sticking closely to the facts known from the surviving correspondence.

== Primary sources ==
Manuscripts evidencing Abraham's life include:

- Jerusalem, National and University Library, MS H.6
- Cambridge, Cambridge University Library, Taylor-Schechter 12.235
- T-S 12.337
- T-S 16.288
- T-S 20.130
- T-S 20.137
- T-S N.S. J 1
- T-S N.S. J 5
- T-S N.S. J 10
- T-S K 25.252
- T-S MS Or. 1080 J 95
- T-S MS Or. 1080 J 263
- T-S MS Or. 1081 J 3
- T-S Misc. Box. 25, fragm. 103
- T-S 6 J 4, fol. 14
- T-S 8 J 7, fol. 23
- T-S 8 J 36, fol. 3
- T-S 10 J 9, fol. 24
- T-S 10 J 10, fol 15
- T-S 10 J 12, fol. 5
- T-S 10 J 13, fol. 6
- T-S 13 J 7, fol. 13
- T-S 13 J 7, fol. 27
- T-S 13 J 0, fol. 7
- T-S 13 J 24, fol. 2
- T-S 18 J 2, fol. 7
- T-S 18 J 4, fol. 18
- T-S 18 J 5, fol. 1
- Oxford, Bodleian Library, MS Hebr., b. 11, fol. 15
- Bod. Lib. MS Hebr., d. 66, fol. 61
- Bod. Lib. MS Hebr., d. 66, fol. 139
