= The Imam and the Indian =

- First edition
- Author: Amitav Ghosh
- Language: English
- Genre: Non-fiction
- Publisher: Ravi Dayal Publishers & Permanent Black
- Publication date: 2002
- Publication place: India
- Media type: Print (hardback)
- Pages: 361
- ISBN: 978-81-7530-047-7
- Preceded by: Countdown
- Followed by: Incendiary Circumstances

The Imam and the Indian is a collection of essays by the Indian writer Amitav Ghosh published in 2002.
