= Sreekandapuram =

- Municipality
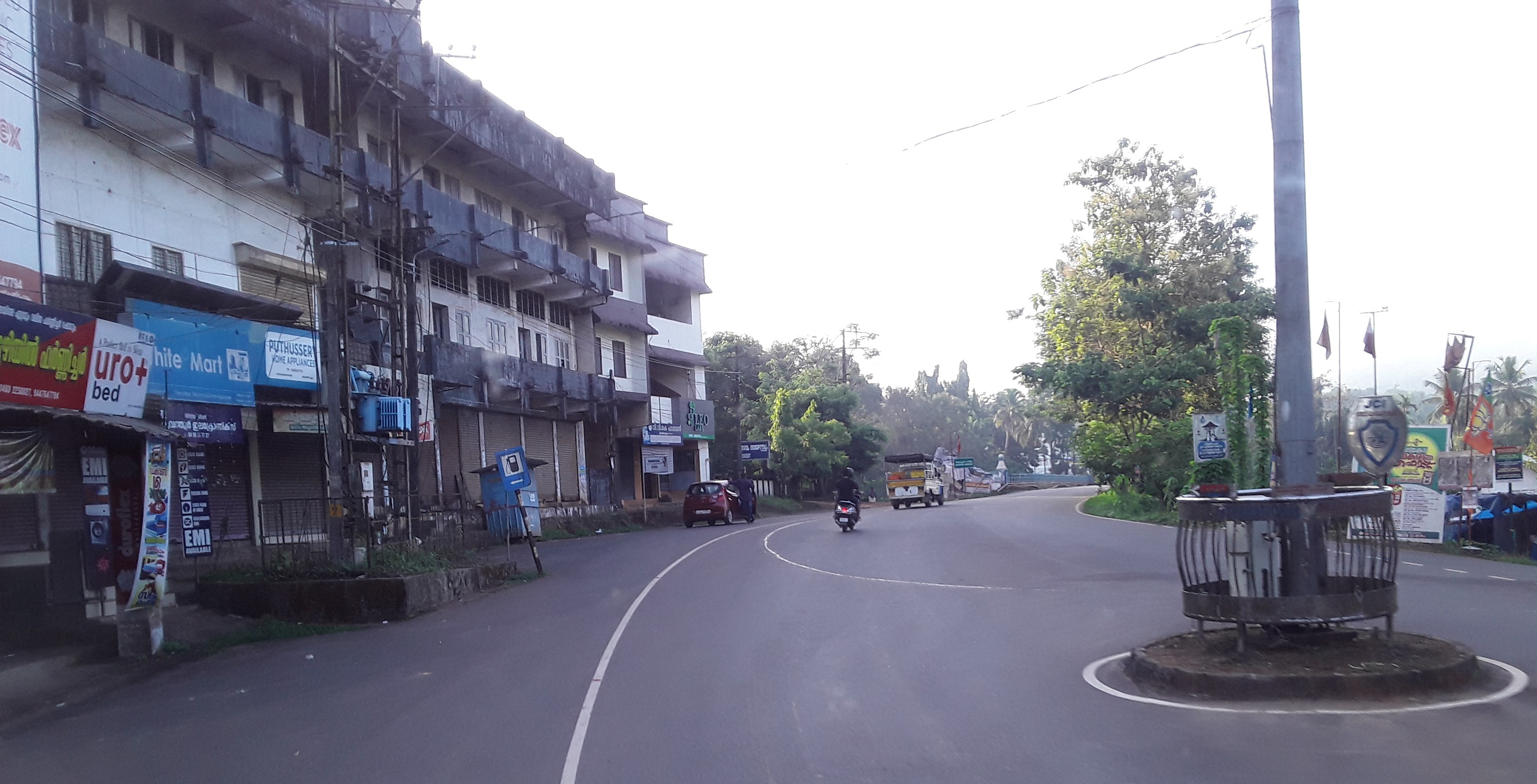
- Sreekandapuram town

- Location in Kerala, India Sreekandapuram (India)
- Coordinates: 12.0451°N 75.5074°E
- Country: India
- State: Kerala
- District: Kannur
- Taluk: Taliparamba
- Municipality: 2015

Government
  - Type: Grade 3 Municipality
  - Body: Sreekandapuram Municipality
  - Municipal chairman: Adv EV Ramakrishnan

Area
  - Total: 68.72 km^{2} (26.53 sq mi)
- Elevation: 15 m (49 ft)

Population
  - Total: 33,489
  - Density: 487.3/km^{2} (1,262/sq mi)

Languages
  - Official: Malayalam, English
- Time zone: UTC+5:30 (IST)
- PIN: 670631
- Telephone code: 0460
- ISO 3166 code: IN-KL
- Vehicle registration: KL-59
- Assembly constituency: Irikkur
- Lok Sabha constituency: Kannur
- Civic Agency: Municipality

Sreekandapuram is a municipality in Kannur district of the Indian state of Kerala.

== Location ==
The town is situated on the banks of the Sreekandapuram River, a major tributary of the Valapattanam River which flows into the Arabian sea. Sreekandapuram is located 33 kilometres (21 mi) northeast of Kannur, 20 kilometres (12 mi) east of Taliparamba and 27 kilometres (17 mi) northwest of Iritty.

== History ==
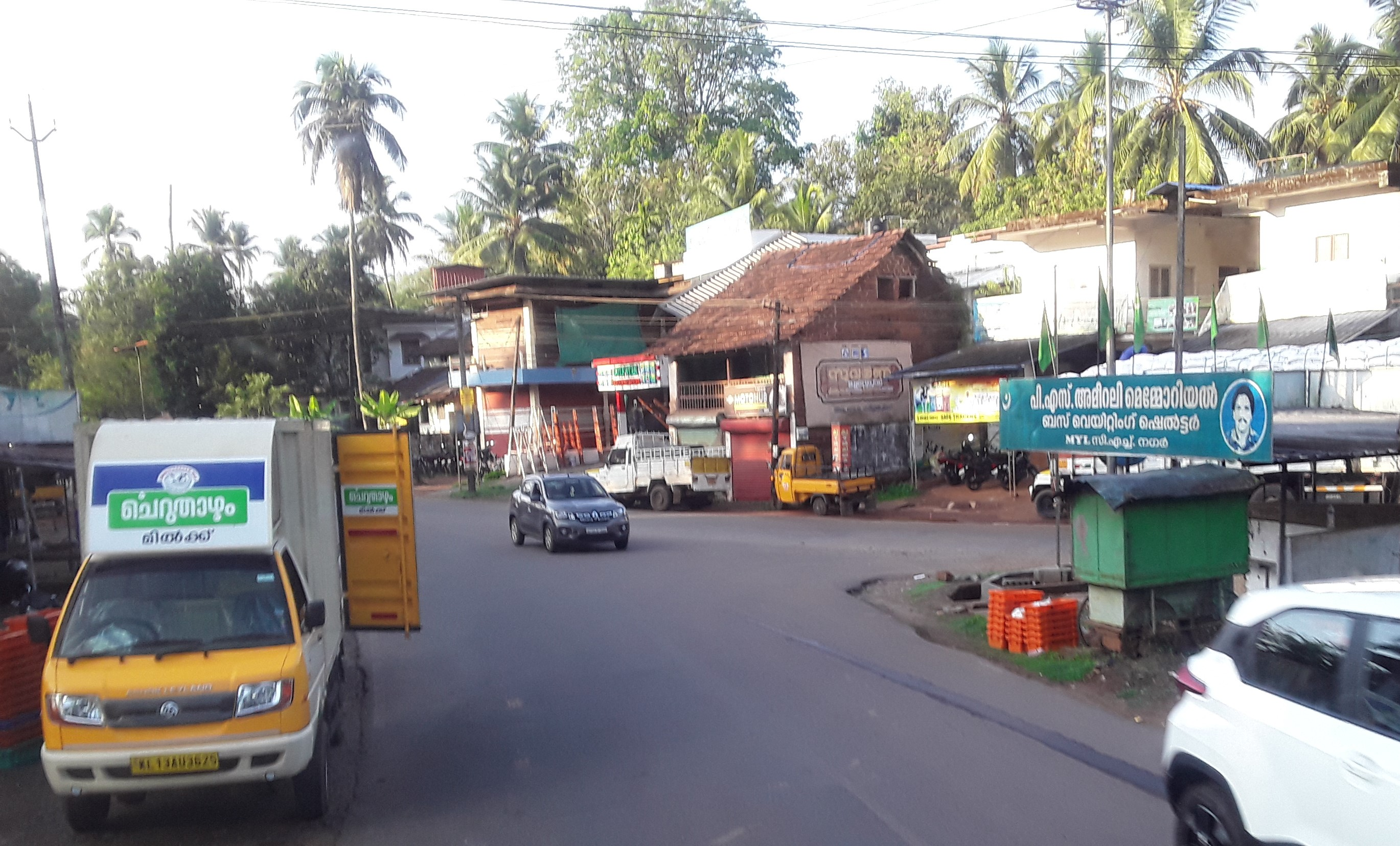
C.H. Nagar, Sreekandapuram

Sreekandapuram was historically ruled by the Mushika Kingdom. During the 9th century, Ad Malik Ibndinar founded mosques at Kodungallur and Madayi and came to Pazhayangadi (Sreekandapuram), travelling by the river, and founded the third mosque here.

The travels of Abraham Ben Yiju, a Jewish merchant who lived in Mangalore in the 1130s and 1140s, included a visit to Sreekandapuram, which he knew as Jurbattan.

=== Kavumbayi struggle ===
The Kavumbayi struggle was a farmers' protest that took place in the Kavumbayi village near Sreekandapuram in 1946. After the Second World War, there was food shortage and landlords collected high rent. The farmers, led by the Karshaka Sangham, wanted to do punam cultivation (shifting cultivation) on the wastelands owned by Karakattidam Nayanar.

On 30 December 1946, the Malabar Special Police opened fire on the protesters. Five farmers - Pulikkal Kunhiraman, P. Kumaran, Manjeri Govindan, Aloramban Krishnan and Thengil Appa Nambiar - were killed on the spot. A martyrs' memorial was later built at Kavumbayi hills.

The names of the Kavumbayi martyrs were included in the Dictionary of Martyrs of India's Freedom Struggle published by the government. Later, a report submitted to the Indian Council of Historical Research (ICHR) suggested that the martyrs of Kavumbayi, Karivellur and Punnapra Vayalar should be removed from the list, saying these protests happened after the interim government led by Jawaharlal Nehru took charge in 1946. The Communist parties in Kerala still remember them as martyrs of the freedom movement.

=== Malabar Migration ===
Since the mid-20th century, people from Northern Travancore migrated to places such as Chempanthotty, Madampam, Chundaparamba, Alex Nagar, Kotturvayal and Karayathumchal. The migrants belonged to different religions, with Christians forming the majority; churches, roads and schools were established following their settlement. While paddy cultivation existed earlier, the migration brought significant changes to the region. Crops such as rubber, coconut, areca nut, pepper, cashew and tapioca came to be cultivated in the hilly areas, leading to the emergence of small towns and markets.

== Administration ==
Under the Madras Village Panchayat Act of 1955, the former Sreekandapuram Grama Panchayat comprised three villages—Sreekandapuram, Nediyanga and Kanhilery. Abdul Rahiman Sahib, M. C. Ramankutty Nambiar and Kunhabiduka served as presidents of the respective village panchayats.

Following the enactment of the Kerala Panchayat Raj Act in 1960, the village panchayat was reconstituted as Sreekandapuram Grama Panchayat, comprising two revenue villages. The first panchayat election was held in 1962, in which N. C. Varghese was elected as its first president.

Sreekandapuram was upgraded to a municipality on 1 November 2015, comprising 31 wards. The municipal office is located in the town, on the banks of Valapattanam River. As of the 2025 Kerala local elections, the ruling party is UDF, who won 18 out of the 31 wards. The current municipal chairperson is Adv.E.V. Ramakrishnan (UDF).

Sreekandapuram Municipality is part of the Irikkur Assembly constituency, which comes under the Kannur Lok Sabha constituency.

=== Municipality wards ===
Sreekandapuram Municipality is composed of the following 31 wards:

Ward no.	Name	Ward no.	Name
1	Chempanthotty	2	Korangode
3	Karayathumchal	4	Ambazhathumchal
5	Kamblari	6	Kanapram
7	Panyal	8	Pullimankunnu
9	Kavumbayi	10	Ayicheri
11	Ellarinji	12	Kaithapram
13	Madambam	14	Cherikode
15	Nedungome	16	Chundapparamba
17	Aalakunnu	18	Kanjileri
19	Balankeri	20	Vayakkara
21	Kaniyarvayal	22	Kottur
23	Panchamoola	24	Avanakkol
25	Sreekandapuram	26	Pazhayangadi
27	Chepparamba	28	Nediyanga kavala
29	Nediyanga	30	Peruvanji
31	Kattayi		

== Law and Order ==
The municipality comes under the jurisdiction of Sreekandapuram police station, established on 31 January 1978. This police station is part of Taliparamba subdivision under Kannur rural police district.

== Geography ==
Since Sreekandapuram town is a flood plain, the low lying areas in the municipality are often prone to flood during south west monsoon. Sreekandapuram area was severely affected by 2019 Kerala floods and 2020 Kerala floods. Due to a land slide from Coorg hills, Kottur river overflowed and submerged Sreekandapuram town and the areas adjacent to it like Podikkalam,Kayimbacheri, Kottur, Therlayi, Thumbeni, Madambam and Chengalayi. The devastation affected severe loss to merchants and their business activities in the town.

== Kerala Kalagramam ==
Kerala Lalitakala Academy has constructed an artist village (Kalagramam) at Kakkananpara near Sreekandapuram that facilitates artists to engage in creative works by staying here. The Kalagramam is named after Padma Vibhushan-winning artist K.G. Subramanyan. The facilities include art galleries, studios, auditorium and guest houses in the first phase.

== Demographics ==
As of 2011 Census, Sreekandapuram Panchayat had a total population of 33,489 with 16,186 males and 17,303 females. The sex ratio was 1069 women per 1000 men. The total number of households were 7,960 in the panchayat limits. In Sreekandapuram, 10.7% of the population was under 6 years of age. Sreekandapuram panchayat had overall literacy of 94.2% where male literacy was 96.9% and female literacy was 91.7%.

Sreekandapuram Panchayat has administration over Sreekandapuram and Nediyanga villages.

== Religion ==
The town of Sreekandapuram has a mixed population of Hindus, Muslims and Christians. To begin with its legacy, its noteworthy one of the earliest mosque in Kerala is situated in Sreekandapuram,The Malik Dinar mosque is situated at Pazhayangadi, 2.2 kilometres (1.4 mi) from the town, and the Pazhayangadi Manna is 2 kilometres (1.2 mi) away on the Payyavoor Road.

A popular Hindu temple in the municipality is the historic Ammakoottam Mahadevi temple. The temple was looted and destroyed by Tipu Sultan, and nothing remained of it but earth and stones covered by bushes up until the 1970s. The land on which it stood was owned by the local Muslim community leader, and when people living around the temple claimed to have witnessed the Devi's presence, it was handed over to local Hindu community leaders and a new temple was built.

Another important temple is the Sree Mahavishnu Temple located at Kottoor, 1.2 kilometres (0.75 mi) away from Sreekandapuram near Iritty-Taliparamba state highway. This temple is said to be over 600 years old and is also said to have been destroyed by Tipu Sultan. It was later rebuilt. It is one among the rare Lord Vishnu temples which face the west direction with 'vatta sreekovil'. 'Punarprathishta Mahotsava' is celebrated every year in the first week of March.

Thrikkadamba Shree Mahavishnu temple was also destroyed by Tipu and it is under reconstruction now. It is 4 kilometres (2.5 mi) away from Sreekandapuram in Taliparamba-Iritty highway. Lord Shiva and Vishnu are equally worshiped here. Vayakkara Kavu is another important place to visit in Sreekandapuram municipality. It is one of the important ecological places in the area. Vana Sasthav is the idol of the Kavu and people pay their offerings there in high devotion.

== Educational organizations ==
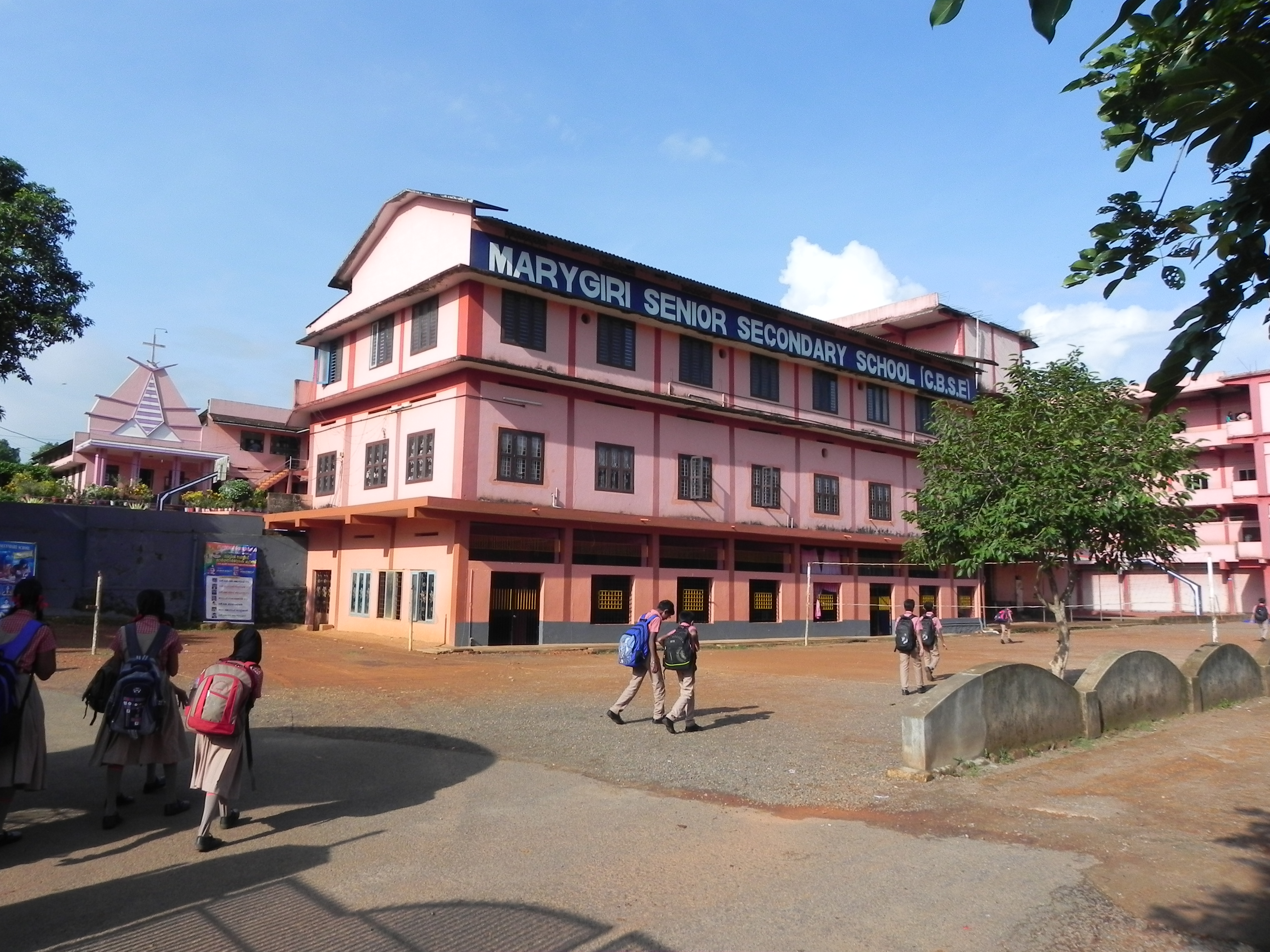
Marygiri School, Sreekandapuram

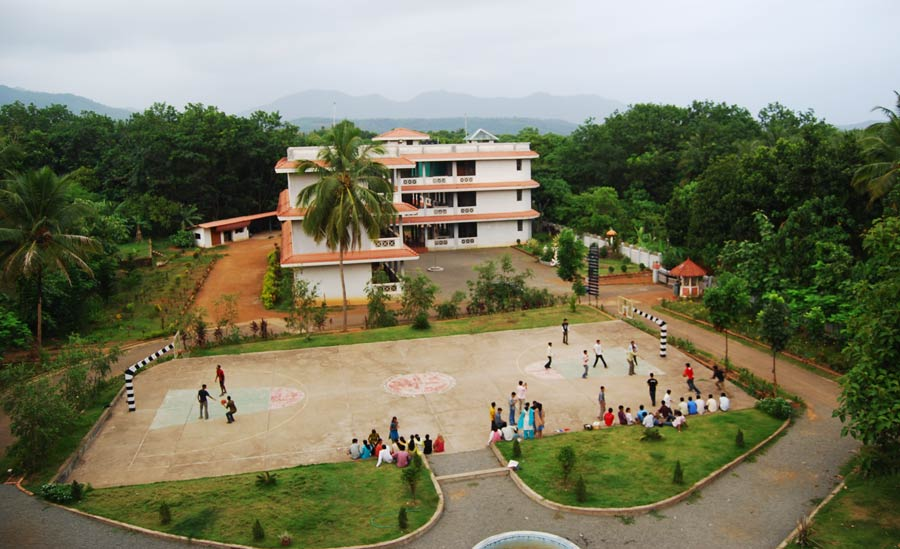
Vimal Jyothi Engineering College, Chemperi

- S.E.S. College, Sreekandapuram
- Vimal Jyothi Engineering College
- Vimal Jyothi Institute of Management and Research, Chemperi
- Kottur Private ITI
- Madampam P.K.M College
- Devamatha Arts And Science College, Paisakary
- Government Higher Secondary School Nedungome
- Government Higher Secondary School Sreekandapuram
- Marygiri Senior Secondary School, Podikalam; 2 kilometres (1.2 mi) from Sreekandapuram town
- Maryland High School, Madampam
- Sal Sabeel Public School Sreekandapuram (CBSE); 1.5 kilometres (0.93 mi) from Sreekandapuram town
- Mapila A.L.P School, Sreekandapuram

== Transportation ==
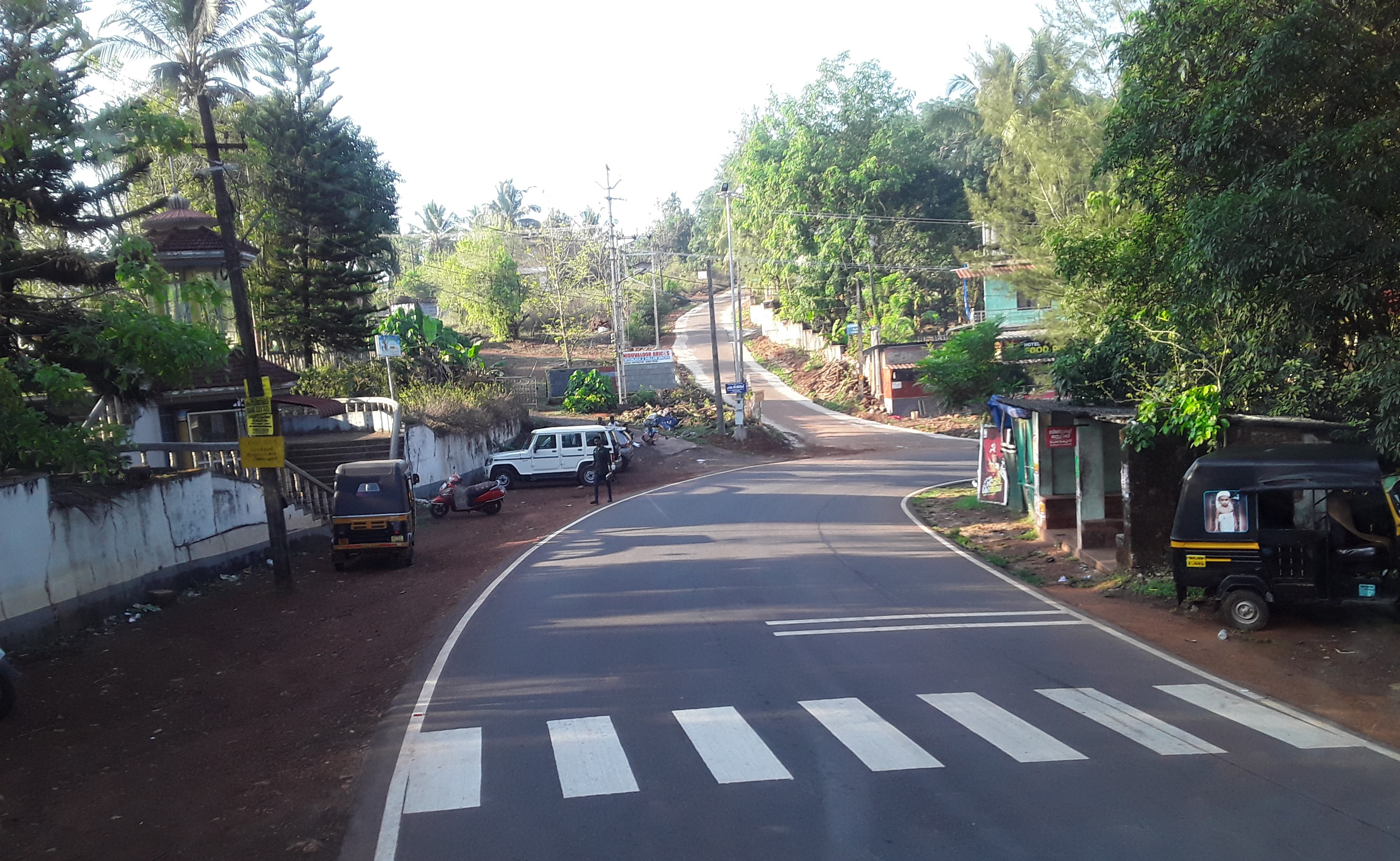
SH 36 in Sreekandapuram

Kerala state highway (SH 36) passes through Sreekandapuram town which connects Taliparamba and Iritty. The road towards the east connects to Mysore and Bangalore and other parts of Karnataka.

National Highway (NH 66) passes through Taliparamba town. Mangalore and Mumbai can be accessed on the northern side and Cochin and Thiruvananthapuram can be accessed on the southern side.

The nearest railway stations are Kannapuram and Kannur, located 29 kilometres (18 mi) and 34 kilometres (21 mi) away respectively on the Shoranur-Mangalore section of the Southern Railway zone.

The nearest airport is Kannur International Airport, about 23.5 kilometres (14.6 mi) south.

== Notable people ==
- V. K. Vismaya, athlete
- Sruthi Lakshmi, actress
- Sreelaya, actress
