= Karayathumchal =

Village in Kerala, India

Karayathumchal is a small village in the Sreekandapuram area of Kannur district, Kerala state, India.

== Location ==
Karayathumchal is located about 25 kilometres (16 mi) east of Thaliparamba town. It is under the Irikkur Assembly Constituency.

== History ==
Migration of people from southern Kerala in the 1950s to 1980s, mainly from Kottayam, dramatically changed the fortunes of Karayathumchal. A vast majority of these migrants were Christians who had a completely different social and agricultural background. These hard working people brought new agricultural practices to this area. They introduced cash crops like rubber, pepper, coconut, etc.

== Education ==
Karayathumchal Govt. U P School is the only educational institution in this village.

== Transportation ==
The national highway passes through Taliparamba town. Mangalore and Mumbai can be accessed on the northern side and Cochin and Thiruvananthapuram can be accessed on the southern side. The road to the east connects to Mysore and Bangalore. The nearest railway station is Kannur on Mangalore-Palakkad line. There are airports at Mangalore Calicut (Kannur International Airport) Kannur.
