= Dancing in Cambodia and at Large in Burma =

- First edition
- Author: Amitav Ghosh
- Language: English
- Genre: Non-fiction
- Publisher: Ravi Dayal Publishers
- Publication date: 1999
- Publication place: India
- Media type: Print (hardback)
- ISBN: 978-8175300170
- Preceded by: In an Antique Land
- Followed by: Countdown

Dancing in Cambodia and at Large in Burma is a collection of essays by Indian writer Amitav Ghosh. It was published in 1998. The new edition of the book consist of five essays: Dancing in Cambodia, At Large in Burma, Stories in Stone, The Town by the Sea and September 11.
