= Nediyanga =

Village in Kerala, India

- Village
- Location in Kerala, India Nediyanga (India)
- Coordinates: 12°5′20″N 75°28′50″E
- Country: India
- State: Kerala
- District: Kannur
- Taluk: Taliparamba

Government
  - Body: Sreekandapuram Municipality

Area
  - Total: 35.22 km^{2} (13.60 sq mi)

Population (2011)
  - Total: 15,859
  - Density: 450.3/km^{2} (1,166/sq mi)

Languages
  - Official: Malayalam, English
- Time zone: UTC+5:30 (IST)
- ISO 3166 code: IN-KL
- Nearest city: Sreekandapuram

Nediyanga is a revenue village in Taliparamba taluk of Kannur district in the Indian state of Kerala. The village is part of Sreekandapuram municipality.

== Demographics ==
As of 2011 India census, Nediyanga village had total population of 15,859 which constitutes 7,753 males and 8,106 females. Nediyenga village has an area spreads over 35.22 km^{2} with 3,838 households. Population in the age group 0-6 was 1,607 (10.1% of total population). Overall literacy of Nediyenga village was 94.7%.

== Transportation ==
The national highway passes through Taliparamba town. Goa and Mumbai can be accessed on the northern side and Cochin and Thiruvananthapuram can be accessed on the southern side. Taliparamba has a good bus station and buses are easily available to all parts of Kannur district. The road to the east of Iritty connects to Mysore and Bangalore. But buses to these cities are available only from Kannur, 22 km to the south. The nearest railway stations are Kannapuram and Kannur on Mangalore-Palakkad line. Trains are available to almost all parts of India subject to advance booking over the internet. There are airports at Kannur, Mangalore and Calicut. All of them are small international airports with direct flights available only to Middle Eastern countries.
