= Deborah Baker =

American biographer and essayist

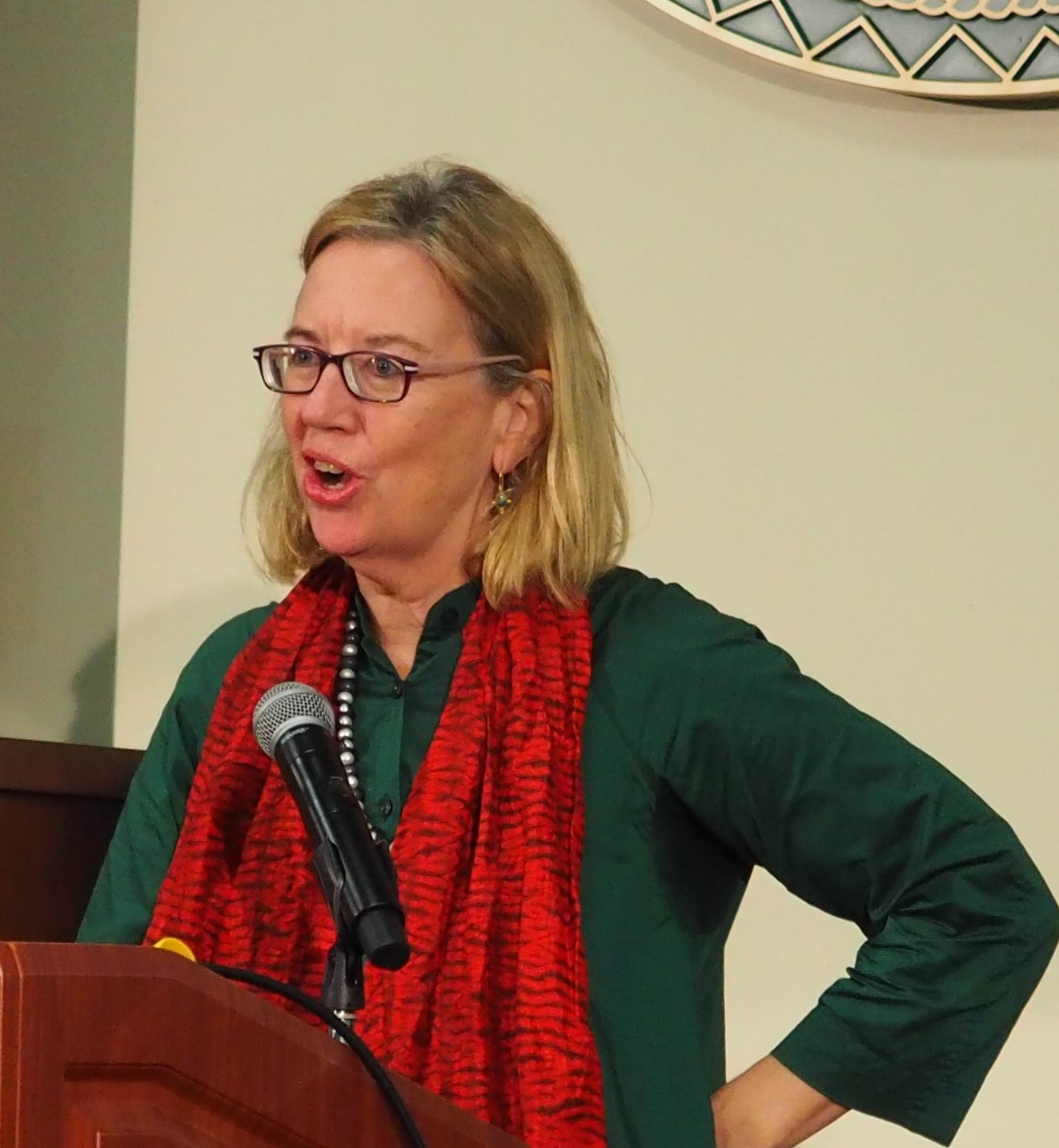
- Born: March 28, 1959 (age 67); Charlottesville, Virginia
- Education: University of Virginia, Cambridge University
- Spouse: Amitav Ghosh
- Writing career
- Notable awards: Guggenheim Fellowship, Whiting Award

Deborah Baker is an American biographer and essayist. She was born on March 28, 1959, in Charlottesville, Virginia.

She is the author of A Blue Hand: The Beats in India, a biography of Allen Ginsberg that focuses on his time in India and of In Extremis: The Life of Laura Riding, a finalist for the Pulitzer Prize in biography in 1994. She also writes for the Los Angeles Times. Her book The Convert: A Tale of Exile and Extremism (2011) is a biography of Maryam Jameelah (born Margaret Marcus), a Jewish woman from New York who converted to Islam. In 2012, she wrote a critical review for The Wall Street Journal of Defender of the Realm, the Manchester-Reid biography of Winston Churchill.

== Family ==
She is married to the Indian Bengali writer Amitav Ghosh and lives in Brooklyn, Calcutta, and Goa.

== Awards ==
Baker was awarded a Guggenheim Fellowship in 2014.

In 2016, she was awarded a Whiting Creative Nonfiction Grant to complete her book, The Last Englishmen: Love, War and the End of Empire.

== Works ==
- Making a Farm: The Life of Robert Bly; Charlottesville, Va., 1981. OCLC 909398434
- In Extremis: The Life of Laura Riding; New York : Grove Weidenfeld, 1992. ISBN 9780802113641, OCLC 213341906
- A Blue Hand: The Beats in India; New York : Penguin Press, 2008. ISBN 9781594201585, OCLC 239110990
- The Convert: A Tale of Exile and Extremism. Saint Paul, Minn. : Graywolf, 2013. ISBN 9781555976279, OCLC 822959870
- The Last Englishmen, Graywolf Press, Minneapolis, Minnesota : Graywolf Press, 2018. ISBN 9781555978044, OCLC 1002562236
- Charlottesville: An American Story, Graywolf Press, Minneapolis, Minnesota : Graywolf Press, 2025. ISBN 9781644453414
