= Amitav Ghosh =

Indian writer (born 1956)

Amitav Ghosh FRSL
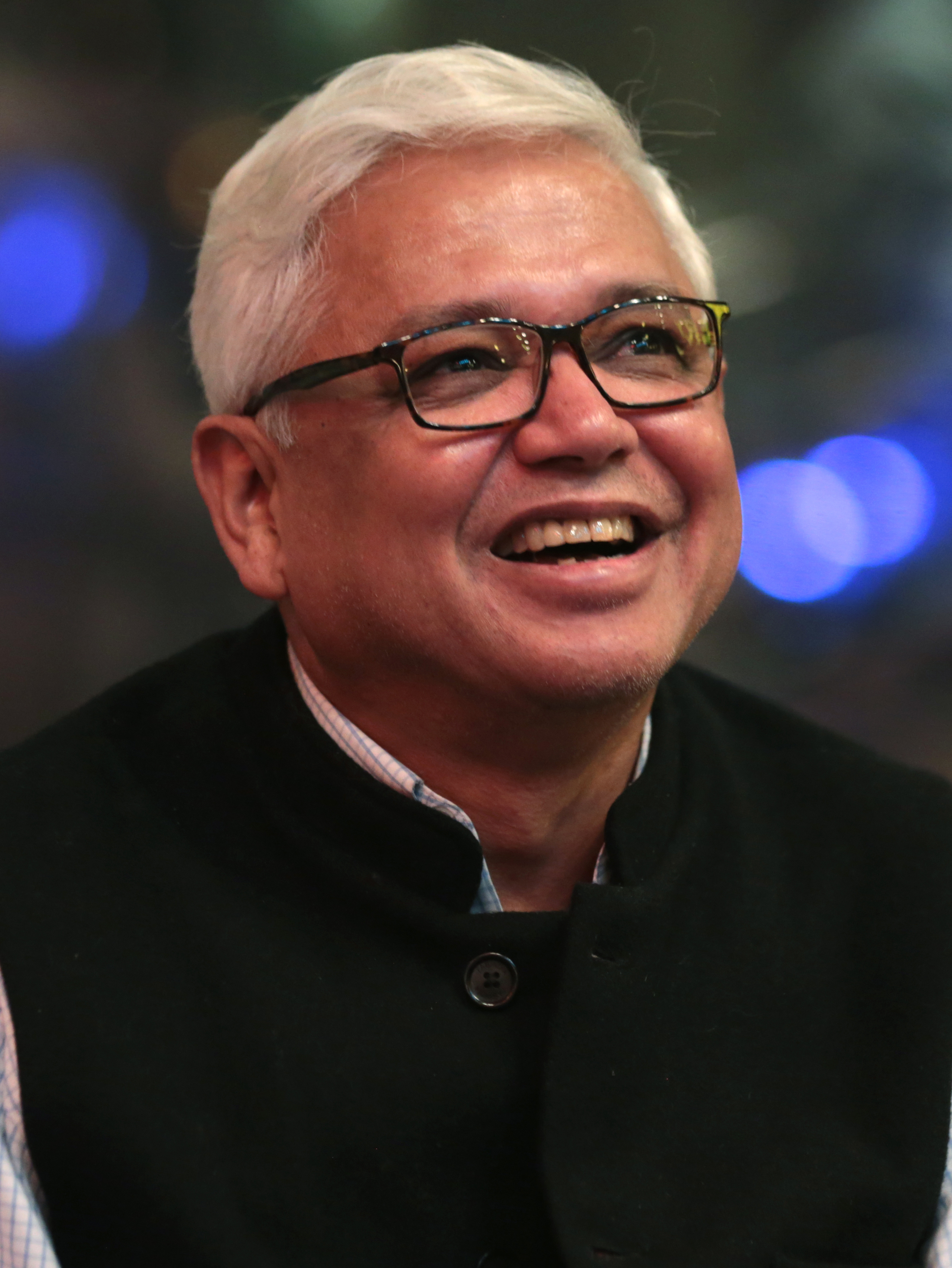
- Ghosh in 2017
- Born: 11 July 1956 (age 70); Calcutta, West Bengal, India
- Education: University of Delhi (BA, MA); University of Oxford (PhD)
- Occupation: Writer
- Spouse: Deborah Baker (wife)
- Writing career
- Genre: Historical fiction
- Notable works: The Shadow Lines, The Glass Palace, Ibis trilogy, The Great Derangement
- Notable awards: Jnanpith Award; Sahitya Akademi Award; Ananda Puraskar; Dan David Prize; Padma Shri; Erasmus Prize; Park Kyong-ni Prize
- Website: www.amitavghosh.com

Amitav Ghosh (Bengali pronunciation: [ɔmitabʱo ɡʱoʃ]; born 11 July 1956) is an Indian-American writer. He won the 54th Jnanpith award in 2018, India's highest literary honour. Ghosh's ambitious novels use complex narrative strategies to probe the nature of national and personal identity, particularly of the people of India and South Asia. He has written historical fiction and non-fiction works discussing topics such as colonialism and climate change.

Ghosh studied at The Doon School, Dehradun, and earned a doctorate in social anthropology at the University of Oxford. He worked at the Indian Express newspaper in New Delhi and several academic institutions. His first novel, The Circle of Reason, was published in 1986, which he followed with later fictional works, including The Shadow Lines and The Glass Palace. Between 2004 and 2015, he worked on the Ibis trilogy, which revolves around the build-up and implications of the First Opium War. His non-fiction work includes In an Antique Land (1992) and The Great Derangement: Climate Change and the Unthinkable (2016).

Ghosh holds two Lifetime Achievement awards and four honorary doctorates. In 2007, he was awarded the Padma Shri, one of India's highest honours, by the President of India. In 2010, he was a joint winner, along with Margaret Atwood, of a Dan David prize, and in 2011, he was awarded the Grand Prix of the Blue Metropolis festival in Montreal. He was the first English-language writer to receive the award. In 2019, Foreign Policy magazine named him one of the most important global thinkers of the preceding decade.

== Life ==
Ghosh was born in Calcutta on 11 July 1956 and was educated at the all-boys boarding school The Doon School in Dehradun. He grew up in India, Bangladesh, and Sri Lanka. His contemporaries at Doon included author Vikram Seth and historian Ram Guha. While at school, he regularly contributed fiction and poetry to The Doon School Weekly (then edited by Seth) and founded the magazine History Times along with Guha. After Doon, he received degrees from St Stephen's College and the Delhi School of Economics, both part of Delhi University.

Ghosh then won the Inlaks Foundation scholarship to complete a D. Phil. in social anthropology at St Edmund Hall, Oxford, under the supervision of British social anthropologist Peter Lienhardt. His thesis, undertaken in the Faculty of Anthropology and Geography, was entitled, "Kinship in relation to economic and social organization in an Egyptian village community", and submitted in 1982.

Ghosh returned to India to begin working on the Ibis trilogy, which includes Sea of Poppies (2008), River of Smoke (2011), and Flood of Fire (2015).

In 2007, Ghosh was awarded the Padma Shri by the Indian government. In 2009, he was elected a Fellow of the Royal Society of Literature. In 2015, he was named a Ford Foundation Art of Change Fellow.

Ghosh currently lives in New York with his wife, Deborah Baker, author of the Laura Riding biography In Extremis: The Life of Laura Riding (1993) and a senior editor at Little, Brown and Company. They have two children, Lila and Nayan.

== Work ==
=== Fiction ===
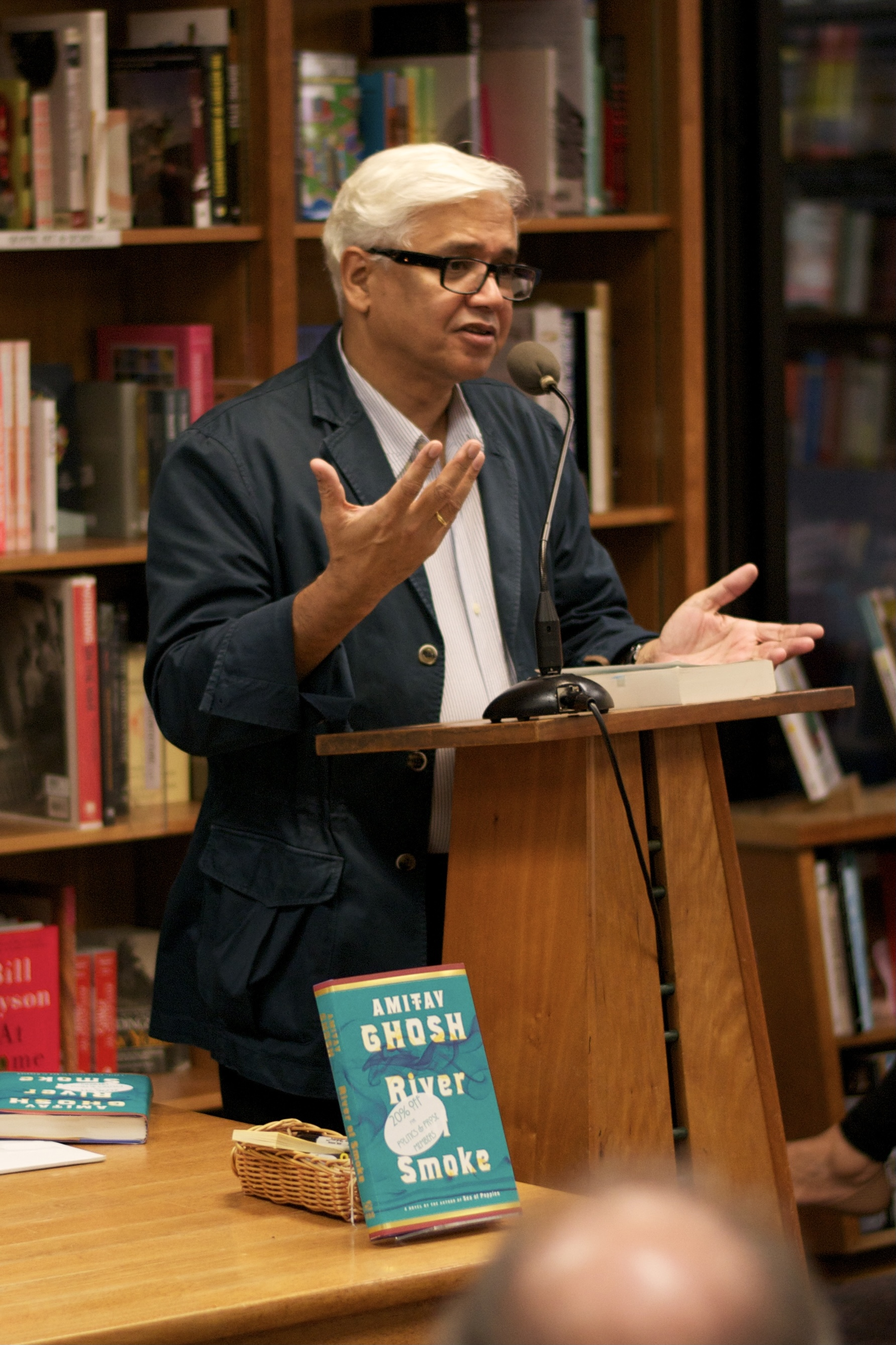
Ghosh promoting River of Smoke in 2011

Ghosh's historical fiction novels include The Circle of Reason (his 1986 debut novel), The Shadow Lines (1988), The Calcutta Chromosome (1996), The Glass Palace (2000), The Hungry Tide (2004), and Gun Island (2019).

Ghosh began working on the Ibis trilogy in 2004. Set in the 1830s, its story follows the build-up of the First Opium War across China and the Indian Ocean region. Its consists of Sea of Poppies (2008), River of Smoke (2011), and Flood of Fire (2015).

Most of Ghosh's work deals with historical settings, especially in the Indian Ocean periphery. In an interview with historian Mahmood Kooria, he said:

It was not intentional, but sometimes things are intentional without being intentional. Though it was never part of a planned venture and did not begin as a conscious project, I realise in hindsight that this is really what always interested me most: the Bay of Bengal, the Arabian Sea, the Indian Ocean, and the connections and the cross-connections between these regions.

The Shadow Lines, according to one blogger, "throws light on the phenomenon of communal violence and the way its roots have spread deeply and widely in the collective psyche of the Indian subcontinent".

Gun Island, published in 2019, deals with climate change and human migration, drew praise from critics. According to a review in the Columbia Journal,

This is Ghosh at his tenacious, exhausted best—marrying a mythical tale from his homeland with the plight of the human condition, all the while holding up a mirror to the country that he now calls home, as well as providing a perhaps too optimistic perspective on the future of our climate!

The novel creates a world of realistic fiction, challenging the agency of its readers to act upon the demands of the environment. The use of religion, magical realism, coincidences, and climate change come together to create a wholesome story of strife, trauma, adventure, and mystery. The reader takes on the journey to solve the story of "the Gun Merchant" and launches themselves into the destruction of nature and the effects of human actions. Ghosh transforms the novel through his main character, his story, and the very prevalent climate crisis. The novel is advertently a call to action intertwined in an entertaining plot. The Guardian however, noted Ghosh's tendency to go on tangents, calling it "a shaggy dog story" that "can take a very roundabout path towards reality, but it will get there in the end".

In 2021, Ghosh published his first book in verse, Jungle Nama, which explores the Sundarbans legend of Bon Bibi.

=== Non-fiction ===
Ghosh's notable non-fiction writings include In an Antique Land (1992), Dancing in Cambodia and at Large in Burma (1998), Countdown (1999), and The Imam and the Indian (2002), a collection of essays on themes such as fundamentalism, the history of the novel, Egyptian culture, and literature. His writings have appeared in newspapers and magazines in India and abroad.

In The Great Derangement: Climate Change and the Unthinkable (2016), Ghosh accuses modern literature and art of failing to adequately address climate change. In The Nutmeg's Curse: Parables for a Planet in Crisis (2021), Ghosh follows the journey of nutmeg from its native Banda Islands to many other parts of the world, using the spice as a lens through which to understand the historical influence of colonialism upon attitudes towards Indigenous cultures and environmental change. In his latest work, Smoke and Ashes: A Writer's Journey Through Opium's Hidden Histories (2023), Ghosh discusses the history of opium, focusing on its colonial history and legacy in India and China and its connection to modern corporate practices, such as Purdue Pharma's role in the ongoing US opioid epidemic. Its discussion of the lead-up to the First Opium War in the 1830s also serves as background to Ghosh's fictional Ibis trilogy.

=== Awards and recognition ===
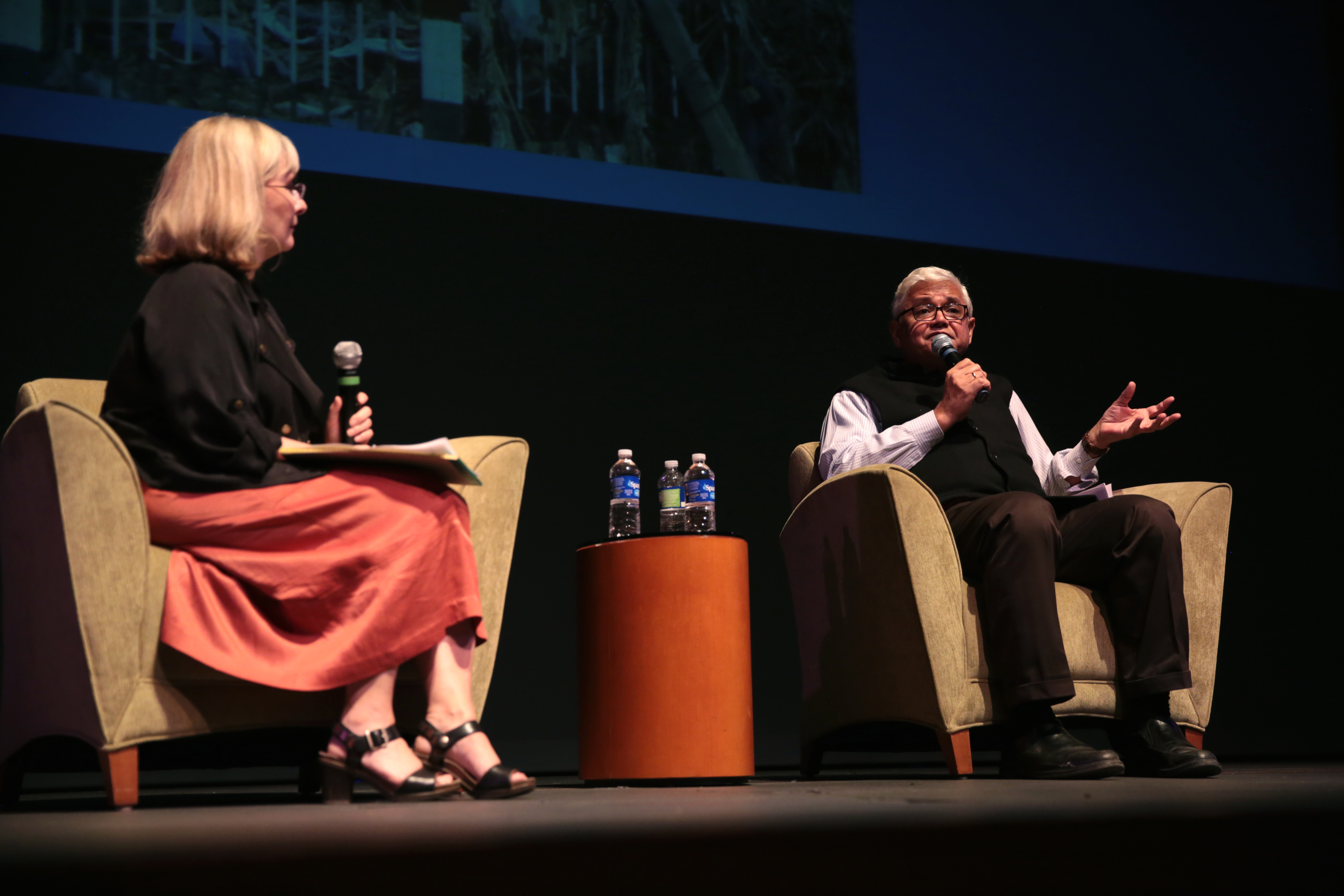
Ghosh speaking at an event with Joni Adamson in 2017.

The Circle of Reason (1986) won the Prix Médicis étranger, one of France's top literary awards. The Shadow Lines (1988) won the Sahitya Akademi Award and the Ananda Puraskar. The Calcutta Chromosome (1996) won the Arthur C. Clarke Award in 1997. Sea of Poppies (2008), the first installment of the Ibis trilogy, was shortlisted for the 2008 Man Booker Prize. It was the co-winner of the Vodafone Crossword Book Award in 2009, as well as co-winner of the 2010 Dan David Prize. River of Smoke (2011), the second Ibis installment, was shortlisted for the Man Asian Literary Prize 2011.

Ghosh famously withdrew his novel The Glass Palace (2000) from consideration for the Commonwealth Writers' Prize, where it was awarded the best novel in the Eurasian section, citing his objections to the term "Commonwealth" and the unfairness of the English-language requirement specified in the rules.

The government of India awarded Ghosh the civilian honour of Padma Shri in 2007. He received a lifetime achievement award at Tata Literature Live, the Mumbai LitFest, on 20 November 2016. He was conferred the 54th Jnanpith award in December 2018 and is the first Indian writer in English to have been chosen for this honour.

Ghosh was awarded the Erasmus Prize 2024, specifically for his writing on climate change: "His work offers a remedy by making an uncertain future palpable through compelling stories about the past. He also wields his pen to show that the climate crisis is a cultural crisis that results from a dearth of the imagination."

His book Smoke and Ashes: Opium’s Hidden Histories, made the 2024 British Academy Book Prize shortlist.

In 2025, Ghosh received the fourteenth Park Kyong-ni Prize in recognition of his contribution to postcolonial and ecological writing, and for highlighting the voices of marginalised communities and the natural world.

In August 2025 Ghosh was selected as the 12th author to contribute to Future Library. He joins other prominent authors whose unpublished manuscripts will be locked away until the year 2114 in a specially designed repository in Oslo, Norway.

On 12 February 2026, Amitav Ghosh won The Wise Owl Literary Award 2026 Non Fiction category, for his book Wild Fictions: Essays.

== Works ==
=== Novels ===
- The Circle of Reason (1986)
- The Shadow Lines (1988)
- The Calcutta Chromosome (1995)
- The Glass Palace (2000)
- The Hungry Tide (2004)
- Ibis trilogy:
  - Sea of Poppies (2008)
  - River of Smoke (2011)
  - Flood of Fire (2015)
- Gun Island (2019)
- Jungle Nama (2021)
- Ghost-Eye (2025)

=== Non-Fiction ===
- In an Antique Land (1992)
- Dancing in Cambodia and at Large in Burma (1998; Essays)
- Countdown (1999)
- The Imam and the Indian (2002; Essays)
- Incendiary Circumstances (2006; Essays)
- The Great Derangement: Climate Change and the Unthinkable (2016)
- The Nutmeg's Curse (2021)
- Uncanny and Improbable Events (2021)
- The Living Mountain (2022)
- Smoke and Ashes (2023)
- Wild Fictions (2025; Essays)

== See also ==
- List of Indian writers
