= The Calcutta Chromosome =

1996 book by Amitav Ghosh

- First edition
- Author: Amitav Ghosh
- Cover artist: Shamshad Husain
- Language: English
- Genre: Thriller, speculative fiction
- Publisher: Ravi Dayal
- Publication date: 1996
- Publication place: India
- Media type: Print (Hardback, later Paperback)
- Pages: 256
- ISBN: 81-7530-005-1
- OCLC: 35759000

The Calcutta Chromosome is a 1996 English-language novel by Indian author Amitav Ghosh. The book, set in Calcutta and New York City at some unspecified time in the future, is a medical thriller that dramatizes the adventures of people who are brought together by a mysterious turn of events. The book is loosely based on the life and times of Sir Ronald Ross, the Nobel Prize–winning scientist who achieved a breakthrough in malaria research in 1898. The novel was the recipient of the Arthur C. Clarke Award in 1997.

Ghosh employs a factual background for the invented events in the novel, drawing upon Ross's Memoirs which was published in 1923.

== Plot summary ==
The novel features a multi-layered narrative that shifts across timelines, tracking an underground counter-science movement that manipulates medical history to achieve immortality via interpersonal genetic transference.

In a near-future New York, an Egyptian data analyst named Antar processes digital debris for the International Water Council using an advanced computer system named Ava. He discovers a damaged identification card belonging to L. Murugan, a former colleague who mysteriously vanished in Calcutta on August 21, 1995. The discovery triggers Antar’s memory of Murugan’s obsession with Sir Ronald Ross. Through Ava, Antar begins tracking Murugan's final days, reconstructing his research into the medical history of malaria.

In the 1995 timeline, Murugan arrives in Calcutta trying to prove his theory that a secret network of native Indians actually guided Ross's breakthroughs. Murugan notes that Ross, despite his relative inexperience, made his sudden discoveries only after two enigmatic volunteers, Abdul Kadir and Lutchman, joined his laboratory. Murugan posits that this cult discovered a "technology for interpersonal transference" using a mutated malaria parasite, allowing them to transmigrate their consciousness into new human hosts across generations. Tracking historical records, Murugan uncovers that in the 19th century, a local woman named Mangala used malaria-infected pigeons to treat syphilitic patients in the laboratory of a British scientist named D.D. Cunningham. Mangala is revealed to be the leader of the movement, and Lutchman--who also uses the regional alias Laakhan-- is her primary disciple.

As Murugan investigates, he crosses paths with Urmila Roy, a journalist, and Sonali Das, an actress. Both women are linked to a reclusive author named Phulboni, whose cryptic stories feature a recurring character named Laakhan, whom he once encountered and is haunted by. The group gradually realizes that the cult is still active in modern Calcutta. Sonali witnesses a ritual confirming that her lover, an affluent contractor named Romen Haldar, is the current vessel for Laakhan's consciousness. Meanwhile, Murugan is intentionally infected with malaria at his boarding house, which is run by a mysterious landlord named Mrs. Aratounian. Murugan and Urmila ultimately discover that Mrs. Aratounian is the current host of Mangala, and that the cult has chosen Urmila to be Mangala's next physical vessel. Suffering from terminal syphilis, Murugan begs Urmila to "take him across" into the next cycle of transmigration. The 1995 timeline ends as the characters converge at the Sealdah railway station and vanish from public record.

Back in the future, Antar realizes his digital investigation is being orchestrated. His neighbor, Tara, reveals herself to be a modern host within the cult, and his computer system, Ava, becomes compromised by the group's network. Antar discovers that the transmigrated souls of Murugan, Urmila, and the other cult members are present within the system. The novel concludes as the digital entities invite Antar to join them, preparing to absorb his consciousness into their collective immortality.

== Themes ==
Silence is a recurring theme in the novel, originating from the often-stated premise that to say something is to change it. Huttunen notes that the workings of the Indian scientific/mystical movement uncovered by Murugan "constitutes a counter-science to Western scientific discourse" (25). The tenets of the group contain aspects of the Hindu belief in the transmigration of souls as well as of contemporary scientific ideas about genetics and cloning (Huttunen 27). Its native Indian members operate through means kept secret from the more Westernized characters and from the reader, and their activities become progressively clearer as the novel continues until their plan is revealed to the reader. Huttunen explains that the methodology of this group is based on the ideas of Emmanuel Levinas about communication by way of silence. In Levinas's view, "the other exists outside the traditional ontology of Western philosophy which conceives of all being as objects that can be internalized by consciousness or grasped by adequate representation ... Consequently silence in this novel represents the kind of unattainable experience that transcends the level of language, or knowing" (30-31). It is this enigma that the novel leaves behind as an abiding theme. The reader is forced to keep thinking about it much after turning the last page. The mystery at the heart of the story is never completely resolved by the author, leaving much to the reader's understanding and interpretation.

== Characters ==
- Antar - A man in the future who is about to retire. He is investigating the disappearance of Murugan.
- Murugan - He calls himself Morgan from time to time. He lives in the 1990s and is an authority on Sir Ronald Ross. Much of the novel is about his tracking the life of Ronald Ross.
- Ronald Ross - The Nobel Prize–winning scientist who found out that malaria is spread through mosquitoes. Much of his research is spoken about. He conducted his experiments on a man called 'Lutchman.' His tale is narrated by Murugan.
- Lutchman - He once lived at Renupur station. His family and whole village had been wiped out by a strange epidemic. He was later picked up by Ross for his experiments and did everything for him. He claimed he was a 'dhooley bearer' or a cleaner. Later in the novel it is revealed that his name was actually 'Laakhan' and he changed his name at every village to sound like a local.
- Mangala - Cleaning woman at Doctor Cunningham's laboratory. But it is her disguise. She is in reality a Demi God who not only discovered the means of treating syphilis with the Malaria parasite but also found a form of asexual reproduction/reincarnation for humans which kept her and Lutchman alive forever.
- Sonali - A writer for Calcutta Magazine, a journalist, and actor who, it is suggested in the novel, transforms herself with the help of Mangala's "science".
- Urmila - A journalist for the same publication as Sonali, she is the one Mangala chooses for her transformation or reincarnation.
- Romen Haldar - Lutchman in his most recent reincarnation.
- Phulboni - Described in the story as a famous Bengali author.

== Awards ==
The Calcutta Chromosome won the Arthur C. Clarke Award in 1997.

== Sources ==
- Chambers, Claire (2003). "Postcolonial Science Fiction: Amitav Ghosh's the Calcutta Chromosome". The Journal of Commonwealth Literature. 38: 57–72. doi:10.1177/0021989404381006. S2CID 161536669.
- Huttunen, Tuomas (2020). "The Calcutta Chromosome: The Ethics of Silence and Knowledge". In Huttunen, Tuomas; Korkka, Janne (eds.). Seeking the Self – Encountering the Other: Diasporic Narrative and the Ethics of Representation. Cambridge Scholars Publishing. pp. 24–38. ISBN 978-1-5275-6185-4.
- Home page at amitavghosh.com
