= The Great Derangement: Climate Change and the Unthinkable =

2016 book by Amitav Ghosh

The Great Derangement
- First edition
- Author: Amitav Ghosh
- Language: English
- Genre: Non-fiction
- Publisher: Penguin Books
- Publication date: 2016
- Publication place: India
- Media type: Print (hardback)
- ISBN: 9789386057433
- Preceded by: Incendiary Circumstances

The Great Derangement: Climate Change and the Unthinkable is a 2016 non-fiction book by Indian writer Amitav Ghosh discussing climate change. In it, Ghosh discusses the cultural depictions, history and politics of climate change, and its relationship to colonialism.

== Background ==
Indian writer Amitav Ghosh delivered a series of lectures on what he perceived was the lack of coverage of climate change in contemporary fiction at the University of Chicago in 2015. He would later adapt the content of the lectures into The Great Derangement.

== Synopsis ==
The book is composed of three parts: Part I, titled Stories, Part II, History, and Part III, Politics. The first part, Stories, explores why the modern novel struggles as an art form to describe and grapple with the concept of climate change. To understand this shortcoming, Ghosh highlights the role of the uncanny. In the second section, History, Ghosh highlights the role of colonialism in the climate crisis. With examples ranging from Miami to Mumbai to New York, Ghosh explores why urban planning deviated and deviates from the indigenous multigenerational knowledge that compelled cultures to build away from the ocean. In the final section, Politics, Ghosh notes that activists who single out capitalism as the systemic driver of climate change miss an important element: imperialism. Ghosh describes how writers and artists increased their engagement with political movements at the same time as industrial activities intensified. Ghosh ties these three sections together with a comparison between the Paris Agreement and Pope Francis's 2015 encyclical on climate change.

== Reception ==
In his review for The Guardian, Pankaj Mishra says, "How such 'progress' changes the global environment is revealed, along with other true faces of easternisation, by Ghosh in his short but broad-ranging and consistently stimulating indictment of our era of the 'great derangement'". Though Mishra notes that "Ghosh's account of literary omissions can occasionally feel selective. ... He doesn't linger long enough on the technical difficulties of incorporating climate change into artistic practice, or whether many novelists haven't already described its consequences, such as civil war and ethnic cleansing," he describes "his indictment of a complacent avant gardism in the arts [as] original and subtle."

In The Seattle Review of Books, Jonathon Hiskes called The Great Derangement "a strange book, with multiple jarring leaps and an impressive breadth of ideas packed into 162 pages". The review praised the book's ambition, but criticised it for not discussing climate change in science fiction, and was mixed on its structure.

Kirkus Reviews gave a positive review, calling it a "slim but certainly significant contribution to the climate crisis dialogue sure to provoke discussion and increased awareness about our imperiled planet."

In a review for the Journal of International Affairs, Astha Ummat gives a strong positive review for The Great Derangement, noting that Ghosh "supplements his thoughts with hard facts and figures" and "maintains the fine balance between technical complexities of the science of climate change and how climate change can in fact also be seen as a crisis of culture." Further, Ummat finds very strong Ghosh's criticism of the 'Politics of Sincerity,' a type of skeptical criticism based on individual lifestyle choices in the face of systemic problems.

== See also ==
- Climate fiction
