= The Circle of Reason (novel) =

1986 novel by Amitav Ghosh

- First UK edition
- Author: Amitav Ghosh
- Language: English
- Genre: Fiction
- Publisher: Hamish Hamilton (UK); Viking Press (US)
- Publication date: 1986
- Publication place: India
- Media type: Print (hardback)
- ISBN: 978-0618329625

The Circle of Reason is the first novel by Indian writer Amitav Ghosh. It was published in 1986. It follows a young Indian protagonist who is eventually suspected of being a terrorist, following an explosion. He must leave India for northern Africa and the Middle East to find safety. Blending elements of fable and picaresque fiction, this book is distinctly postcolonial in its marginalization of Europe and postmodern in its nonlinear structure and thick intertextuality.

== Characters ==
Alu (Nachiketa Bose) is the protagonist in this book. He is an orphan child who goes to live with his uncle with whom he did not know previously. Alu is then wrongly accused of being a terrorist and eventually becomes a fugitive. He provides the book with a search for reasoning and belonging in life.

Balaram Bose is Alu's uncle. He studies phrenology, the science of determining personality by the shape of one's skull. He becomes fascinated with Alu's skull shape and acts as a mentor towards Alu. Balaram shows how science can impact society.

Toru Debi is Balaram's wife and takes on the role of being Alu's caregiver. She provides Alu with a sense of warmth and an emotional connection that he does not receive from Balaram. Her character provides the book with emotional balance and wisdom.

Bhudeb Roy is the book's villain character. He is a local official in the city of Lalpukur and represents the abuse of institutional power. The embodiment of corruption and hypocrisy that Bhudeb Roy portrays leads to tension and conflict between him and Balaram and Alu.

Zindi is a woman who takes care of Alu during his fugitive time in A-Ghazira. She is able to provide him with shelter and help him figure out his next steps in life. She portrays a strong female character and provides the book with more emotional connection and compassion.

Kulfi is another woman who lived in Al-Ghazira as a cook in Zindi's home. Throughout the book, Alu's journey and Kulfi's life have a connection shown symbolically. Her character balances logic and imagination and enriches the story by challenging the idea of scientific reasoning. She represents freedom and thinking outside of the box.

== Book Breakdown ==
The Circle of Reason is divided into three main parts, each of which follows Alu through life and provides the book with different themes.

Part One – Satwa (Reason): The first part of the book is set in Lalpukur. The purpose of this part is to lay down a foundation for the rest of the novel by establishing key roles and relationships.This section offers an insight into who Alu is as a person and how he will grow in the rest of the book. Something key to Alu's character is the shape of his head; it is quite large and oddly shaped. Balaram and his studies of phrenology, as well as Toru Debi, are introduced in this section. Part one is also when the initial explosion happens. The explosion occurred at Balaram's house and Bhudeb Roy, who has never liked Balaram, tells everyone, including the police, that it was Alu who caused the explosion. This ends with Alu being framed as a terrorist and carries the book into part two.

Part Two – Rajas (Passion): The second part of the book is set in Al-Ghazira. Al-Ghazira is where Alu flees to at first. It is an oil-town with a very diverse society. Alu must navigate through an unfamiliar place with unfamiliar people and learn to survive by himself. He eventually meets Zindi which was very important because she gave him a place to live, taught him how to weave, and gives Alu an overall purpose in life. He also meets Kulfi in this section. He learns to adapt and eventually thrive, showcasing a state of resilience. However, staying in Al-Ghazira was not an option because the terrorist accusations followed him, which leads to part three.

Part Three – Tamas (Death): The third part of the book is set in North Africa. Alu was not able to stay in Al-Ghazira as it was too dangerous. Kulfi and Zindi join Alu in his journey to North Africa and continue to protect him. While in North Africa, Alu becomes involved in trade as his weaving skills continue to develop. Eventually, the police from Alu's hometown track him down and launch a raid of the town al-Burj, where Alu was residing at the time. This causes mass chaos and violence among everyone in the town. The book ends with Alu being able to escape the police in a crowd of others fleeing the town. Alu never returns to India and this end to his journey ultimately concludes his circle of reason.

== Themes ==
The Circle of Reason possesses many themes, ones shown in multiple ways throughout the book. Listed below are just a few of the main ones that are key to the plot of the novel.

Travel and Displacement: From the very beginning of the book, Alu is immediately put into an entirely new place that he is supposed to call home. He has to adapt to new people, unfamiliar cultures, and different experiences. From there, he is forced to travel to a new place and try to make a home out of it, even though there is another new culture to endure. He is out of place and away from home, making it a struggle for him. Finally, Alu has to venture to another place he has never been and again, feeling a shift in his belonging. Because there are numerous times where Alu has to travel to unknown places, this becomes a theme for the book.

Sense of Belonging: Since traveling is a heavy theme in the book, the search for belonging goes hand in hand with it. The constant displacement that Alu experiences makes it hard for him to find his own place. Throughout his travels however, he learns different things about himself and is able to find home, not physically but mentally. By the end of the book, Alu is able to find that sense of belonging and discovers belonging comes from within.

Circularity: Circularity appears in the book in many different ways. One way is the three parts of the book, they come together to not form an endpoint but rather a cyclical pattern that represents many Hindu beliefs. Another way circularity is shown is through the calm and chaos that repeats itself in different ways. For example, Balaram always believed in being rational and the scientific aspects of life, however, at one point he became obsessed with hygiene. He becomes so obsessed that his actions become destructive. Lastly, to point out the obvious example, the title of the book, The Circle of Reason, hints at the fact that there will be a cycle of events. These are a few examples of how circularity can be perceived within the book, there are countless more examples.

== Awards ==
The Circle of Reason won the Prix Medicis Étrangère, a French literary award, in 1990.
