= List of IIM Bangalore alumni =

This list of IIM Bangalore alumni includes notable people who are alumni of Indian Institute of Management Bangalore.

== Academics ==
- Aswath Damodaran (PGP 1979), Kerschner Family Chairperson in Finance Education & Professor of Finance, Stern School of Business, New York University
- Das Nayarandas (PGP 1984), Edsel Bryant Ford Professor of Business Administration and Senior Associate Dean for HBS Publishing & External Relations at Harvard Business School
- Gopal Krishna Nayak (PGP 1988), Former Director of IIIT Bhubaneswar
- Raghavendra Rau (PGP 1989), Sir Evelyn de Rothschild Professor of Finance, Judge Business School, University of Cambridge
- Sangeet Paul Choudary (PGP 2006), business scholar; author of the books Platform Revolution and Platform Scale; youngest recipient of the IIMB Distinguished Alumnus Award (DAA) at the age of 37
- Rahul Singh (PGP 2015), Senior Assistant Director at Nanyang Technological University, Singapore; author of several books including An Atheist gets the Gita, Engineering to Ikigai, and Hitched or Ditched.

== Arts and literature ==
- Ravi Subramanian (PGP 1993), author
- Karan Bajaj (PGP 2002), American author
- Nila Madhab Panda, filmmaker and director

== Business ==
- Shashi Sinha (PGP 1981), CEO, IPG India
- Apurva Purohit (PGP 1989), President of Jagran Prakashan Limited, businesswoman and author
- Sameer Suneja (PGP 1994), Global CEO, Perfetti Van Melle
- Ashish Goel (PGP 2004), founder and CEO of Urban Ladder, online furniture sales company
- PC Mustafa (PGSEM 2004-07), Founder and CEO of ID Fresh Food

== Public service ==
- K. Radhakrishnan (PGP 1976), former chairman of ISRO
- Ravi Neelakantan (PGP 1982), IFS, diplomat
- Hasmukh Adhia (PGPPM 2002), IAS, Revenue Secretary of India
