= Crossword Book Award =

Indian literary award

- Awarded for: Indian novels written by Indian authors
- Sponsored by: Hutch Essar (2004–2007); Vodafone (2008–2010); The Economist (2011–2013); Raymond Group (2014–present)
- Country: India
- Presented by: Crossword Bookstores
- Hosted by: Crossword Bookstores
- First award: 1998
- Website: www.crosswordbookawards.com

The Crossword Book Awards is an Indian literary award presented annually by Crossword Bookstores. The award recognises the finest of Indian writing in English as selected by a jury and readers, and promotes Indian authors and their books. It is among the longest-running literary awards in India.

== Categories ==
The Crossword Book Awards has two categories:

== Jury Awards ==
The Jury Awards are decided by panels with three jurors per category. The categories include:

- Fiction
- Non-fiction
- Business and management
- Translations
- Children's books

== Popular Choice Awards ==
The Popular Choice Awards are determined through voting by readers across Crossword Bookstore outlets and online platforms. Categories include:

- Fiction
- Non-fiction
- Children's books
- Business and management
- Mind, body and spirit

== History and administration ==
=== Inception and Evolution ===
The award was instituted in 1998 by Crossword Bookstores to encourage and promote Indian writing. According to the Crossword Bookstore website:

"While several Indian writers have won awards abroad, we had observed that there was no equivalent award in India. We therefore decided to take on the role of encouraging and promoting good Indian writing and instituted the Book Awards, in 1998. It is the only Indian award that not only recognizes and rewards good writing but also actively promotes the authors and their books."

Over the years, the awards have been presented under different sponsor-backed titles, including the Crossword Book Award (1998–2003), the Hutch Crossword Book Award (2004–2007), the Vodafone Crossword Book Award (2008–2010), the Economist Crossword Book Award (2011–2013), the Raymond & Crossword Book Award (2014–2018), and the Crossword Book Awards (2024–present).

=== Nomination and Selection Process ===
For the Jury Awards, publishers submit nominations during an annual entry period, typically held between March and April. The submitted titles are reviewed to ensure they meet the award’s eligibility requirements before being forwarded to the jury for evaluation. The panel is typically composed of authors, literary critics, journalists, editors, and other experts associated with the respective categories. The jury, selects a longlist of ten titles in each category, which is subsequently narrowed to a shortlist of five titles. The final winners are announced at an awards ceremony typically held in December in Mumbai.

For the Popular Choice Awards, the selection process begins later in the year. In this category, five books in each of five categories—Fiction, Non-fiction, Children’s books, Business and Management, and Mind, Body & Spirit—are identified by Crossword based on annual sales data and rankings from Crossword stores, verified by independent auditors. Readers are then invited to vote online, and the winners in each category are determined through this public voting process.

Previous winners.

Year	Category	Author	Title	Refs
1998	English Fiction	I. Allan Sealy	The Everest Hotel	
1999	English Fiction	Vikram Seth	An Equal Music	
1999	Indian Language Fiction Translation	M. Mukundan	On the Banks of the Mayyazhi	
2000	English Fiction	Jamyang Norbu	The Mandala of Sherlock Holmes	
2000	Indian Language Fiction Translation	Bama / Translator: Lakshmi Holmström	Karukku	
2004	English Fiction	Amitav Ghosh	The Hungry Tide	
2004	Indian Language Fiction Translation	Chandrasekhar Rath / Translator: Jatindra Kumar Nayak	Astride the Wheel (Yantrarudha)	
2005	English Fiction	Salman Rushdie	Shalimar the Clown	
2005	English Non Fiction	Suketu Mehta	Maximum City: Bombay Lost & Found	
2005	Indian Language Fiction Translation	Krishna Sobti	The Heart Has Its Reasons	
2005	Popular Award	Rahul Bhattacharya	Pundits From Pakistan	
2006	English Fiction	Vikram Chandra	Sacred Games	
2006	English Non Fiction	Vikram Seth	Two Lives	
2006	Indian Language Fiction Translation	Ambai (C. S. Lakshmi) / Translator: Lakshmi Holmström	In a Forest, a Deer	
2006	Indian Language Fiction Translation	M. Mukundan / Translator: Gita Krishnankutty	Kesavan's Lamentations	
2006	Popular Award	Kiran Desai	The Inheritance of Loss	
2007	English Fiction	Usha K. R.	A Girl and a River	
2007	English Non Fiction	William Dalrymple	The Last Mughal	
2007	Indian Language Fiction Translation	Sankar / Translator: Arunava Sinha	Chowringhee	
2007	Indian Language Fiction Translation	Anand / Translated from Malayalam by Gita Krishnankutty	Govardhan's Travels	
2007	Popular Award	Namita Devidayal	The Music Room	
2008	English Fiction	Amitav Ghosh	Sea of Poppies	
2008	English Fiction	Neel Mukherjee	Past Continuous	
2008	English Non Fiction	Basharat Peer	Curfewed Night	
2008	Indian Language Fiction Translation	Manohar Shyam Joshi / Translator: Ira Pande	T’TA Professor	
2008	Popular Award	Pallavi Aiyar	Smoke & Mirrors	
2009	English Fiction	Kalpana Swaminathan	Venus Crossing: Twelve Stories of Transit	
2009	English Non Fiction	Rajni Bakshi	Bazaars, Conversations and Freedom	
2009	English Non Fiction	Sunanda K. Datta-Ray	Looking East to Look West: Lee Kuan Yew's Mission India	
2009	Indian Language Fiction Translation	Sarah Joseph / Translator: Valson Thampu	Othappu: The Scent of the Other Side	
2009	Popular Award	Rajni Bakshi	Bazaars, Conversations and Freedom	
2009	Children's Literature	Siddhartha Sarma	The Grasshopper's Run	
2010	English Fiction	Omair Ahmad	Jimmy the Terrorist	
2010	English Fiction	Anjali Joseph	Saraswati Park	
2010	English Non Fiction	VS Ramachandran	The Tell-Tale Brain	
2010	Indian Language Fiction Translation	NS Madhavan / Translator: Rajesh Rajamohan	Litanies of Dutch Battery	
2010	Popular Award	Ashwin Sanghi	Chanakya's Chant	
2010	Children's Literature	Ranjit Lal	Faces in the Water	
2011	English Non Fiction	Anuradha Roy	The Folded Earth	
2011	English Non Fiction	Aman Sethi	A Free Man	
2011	Indian Language Fiction Translation	Anita Agnihotri / Translated from Bengali by Arunava Sinha	17	
2011	Indian Language Fiction Translation	Narayan / Translated from Malayalam by Catherine Thankamma	The Araya Women	
2011	Popular Award	Ravi Subramanian	The Incredible Banker	
2011	Children's Literature	No Award		
2013	English Fiction	Jerry Pinto	Em and the Big Hoom	
2013	English Fiction	Janice Pariat	Boats on Land	
2013	English Non Fiction	Ananya Vajpeyi	Righteous Republic	
2013	English Non Fiction	Pankaj Mishra	From The Ruins Of Empire	
2013	Indian Language Fiction Translation	Ismat Chugtai / Translated by M Asaduddin	A Life In Words	
2013	Popular Award	Ravi Subramanian	The Bankster	
2013	Children's Literature	Payal Kapadia	Wisha Wozzariter	
2013	Children's Literature	Uma Krishnaswami	Book Uncle and Me	
2015	English Fiction	Anees Salim	The Blind Lady’s Descendants	
2015	English Non Fiction	Samanth Subramanian	This Divided Island: Stories from the Sri Lankan War	
2015	Indian Language Fiction Translation	Sundara Ramaswamy / Translated from Tamil by Lakshmi Holmstrom	Children, Women, Men	
2015	Popular Award	Ravi Subramanian	Bankerupt	
2015	Kotak Junior Children's Literature	Shals Mahajan	Timmi in Tangles	
2016	English Fiction	Amitav Ghosh	Flood of Fire	
2016	English Non Fiction	Akshaya Mukul	Gita Press and the Making of Hindu India	
2016	Indian Language Fiction Translation	Shamsur Rahman Faruqi	The Sun That Rose From the Earth	
2016	Popular Award	Amish Tripathi	Scion of Ikshvaku	
2016	Kotak Junior Children's Literature	Ranjit Lal	Nana was a Nutcase	
2017	Indian Fiction: Jury	Sujit Saraf	Harilal and Sons	
2017	Indian Non Fiction: Jury	Josy Joseph	A Feast of Vultures: The Hidden Business of Democracy in India	
2017	Indian Language Fiction Translation	Subhash Chandran / Translated from Malayalam by Fathima EV	A Preface to Man	
2017	Children's Literature: Jury	Anita Nair	Muezza and Baby Jaan	
2017	Indian Fiction: Popular	Durjoy Datta	Our Impossible Love	
2017	Indian Non Fiction: Popular	Sadhguru	Inner Engineering: A Yogi's Guide to Joy	
2017	Children's Literature: Popular	Archita Mishra	The Storm Bringer	
2017	Business & Management: Popular	Shantanu Guha Ray	The Target	
2017	Biography: Popular	Karan Johar and Poonam Saxena	An Unsuitable Boy	
2017	Health & Fitness	Isha Foundation	A Taste of Well-Being	
2018	Indian Fiction: Jury	Prayaag Akbar	Leila	
2018	Indian Non Fiction: Jury	Snigdha Poonam	Dreamers: How Young Indians Are Changing The World	
2018	Indian Language Fiction Translation	Benyamin / Translated from Malayalam by Shahnaz Habib	Jasmine Days	
2018	Children's Literature: Jury	Nandhika Nambi	Unbroken	
2018	Indian Fiction: Popular	Durjoy Datta	The Boy Who Loved	
2018	Indian Non Fiction: Popular	Sudha Murthy	Three Thousand Stitches	
2018	Children's Literature: Popular	Ruskin Bond	Looking For The Rainbow	
2018	Business & Management: Popular	Chandramouli Venkatesan	Catalyst	
2018	Biography: Popular	Soha Ali Khan	The Perils of Being Moderately Famous	
2018	Health & Fitness	Sanjeev Kapoor, Dr. Sarita Daware	You’ve Lost Weight : The Easy Guide To Receiving This Compliment Every Day	
2018	Lifetime Achievement Award	Shashi Tharoor		
2019	Indian Fiction: Jury	Madhuri Vijay	The Far Field	
2019	Indian Non Fiction: Jury	Shanta Gokhale	One Foot on the Ground: A Life Told Through the Body	
2019	Indian Language Fiction Translation	N. Prabhakaran, tr. by Jayasree Kalathil	Diary of a Malayali Madman	
2019	Children's Literature: Jury	Richa Jha and illustrated by Sumanta Dey	Machher Jhol: Fish Curry	
2019	Indian Fiction: Popular	Twinkle Khanna	Pyjamas are Forgiving	
2019	Indian Non Fiction: Popular	Gaur Gopal Das	Life's Amazing Secrets: How to Find Balance and Purpose	
2019	Children's Literature: Popular	Sudha Murty	The Upside-Down King: Unusual Tales about Rama and Krishna	
2019	Business & Management: Popular	Anju Sharma	Corporate Monk, A Journey From Wealth To Wisdom	
2019	Biography: Popular	Krishna Trilok	Notes of a Dream	
2019	Health & Fitness	Dr. Jaishree Sharad	Skin Rules: Your 6-week Plan to Radiant Skin	
2024	Jury Fiction	Saharu Nusaiba Kannanari	Chronicle of an Hour and a Half	
2024	Jury Non Fiction	Zeyad Masroor Khan	City on Fire	
2024	Jury Business & Management	Karthik Muralidharan	Accelerating India's Development: A State-led Roadmap For Effective Governance	
2024	Jury Translations	Sandhya Mary, translated from the Malayalam by Jayasree Kalathil	Maria, Just Maria	
2024	Jury Children's Books	Shabnam Minwalla	Zen	
2024	Jury Children's Books	Andaleeb Wajid	The Henna Start-Up	
2024	Popular Fiction	Twinkle Khanna	Welcome to Paradise	
2024	Popular Non Fiction	Lt Gen. K.J.S. 'Tiny' Dhillon (Retd)	Kitne Ghazi Aaye Kitne Ghazi Gaye: My Life Story	
2024	Popular Business & Management	Radhakrishnan Pillai	Chanakya’s 100 Best Sutras: Ageless Wisdom for Unlocking Your Potential and Achieving Your Goals	
2024	Popular Children's Books	Ruskin Bond, Illustrated by David Yambem	All-time Favourite Nature Stories	
2024	Popular Translations	Charu Nivedita, Translated from the Tamil by Nandini Krishnan	Conversations with Aurangzeb	
2024	Mind, Body, & Spirit	Gaur Gopal Das	Energize Your Mind: Learn the Art of Mastering Your Thoughts, Feelings and Emotions	
2024	Lifetime Achievement Award	Amitav Ghosh		
2025	Jury Fiction	Ruchir Joshi	Great Eastern Hotel	
2025	Jury Non Fiction	Manu S. Pillai	Gods, Guns and Missionaries	
2025	Jury Business & Management	Duvvuri Subbarao	Just a Mercenary?	
2025	Jury Translations	Manoj Kuroor translated from the Malayalam by J. Devika	The Day the Earth Bloomed	
2025	Jury Children's Books	Varsha Seshan, Illustrated by Denise Antao	The Wall Friends Club	
2025	Popular Fiction	Prajakta Koli	Too Good to Be True	
2025	Popular Non Fiction	Mohar Basu	Shah Rukh Khan	
2025	Popular Business & Management	Thomas Mathew	Ratan Tata	
2025	Popular Children's Books	Sudha Murty	Grandpa’s Bag of Stories	
2025	Mind, Body, & Spirit	Sadhguru	Enlightenment	
2025	Lifetime Achievement Award	Shanta Gokhale		
