= Wisden (disambiguation) =

Wisden (Wisden Cricketers' Almanack) is a reference book published annually in the United Kingdom.

Wisden may also refer to:

== Media ==
- Wisden Cricketers' Almanack Australia
- Wisden Cricket Monthly (WCM), UK-based print and digital cricket magazine
- Wisden Asia Cricket, monthly cricket magazine
- The Wisden Cricketer, cricket monthly magazine
- WisdenIndia.com, Wisden.pk and Wisden.lk, a defunct set of websites which ran from 2012 to 2018 focusing on India, Pakistan and Sri Lanka respectively.

== Persons ==
- Wisden (surname)

== Others ==
- Wisden Group, group of companies formed by John Wisden & Co Ltd, publishers of Wisden Cricketers' Almanack
- Wisden Trophy, trophy awarded to the winner of the Test cricket series played between England and the West Indies
