= Pundits from Pakistan =

2005 book by Rahul Bhattacharya

- Cover of Pundits from Pakistan
- Author: Rahul Bhattacharya
- Illustrator: Shreya Debi
- Cover artist: Moonis Ijlal
- Language: English
- Subject: Cricket
- Publisher: Picador
- Publication date: 2005
- Media type: Paperback
- Pages: 344 pp (first edition)
- ISBN: 0-330-43979-0
- OCLC: 61246919
- LC Class: GV923 .B45 2005

Pundits from Pakistan is a book on cricket by Indian writer Rahul Bhattacharya. It covers the Indian cricket team's tour of Pakistan in the year 2004. While the book is largely about cricket, it also tells of how the tour had an impact that went far beyond sub-continental cricket in terms of the goodwill and sense of bonhomie it created between the people of the two countries, thereby encouraging peaceful relations.

Published in 2005, it was Rahul Bhattacharya's first book, and received wide appreciation within cricketing circles. In 2010 it was voted number four of the Ten Best Cricket Books of all time in The Wisden Cricketer. He covered the tour for The Guardian and The Wisden Cricketer.

== Overview ==
India's last full tour of Pakistan had been in late 1989, although the Indians had visited for three one-day matches in 1997. Pakistan had toured India in 1999, before sporting ties were severed by India because of growing political hostility. The tour of Pakistan in 2004 was a part of the ongoing peace process between the governments of the countries. The itinerary included seven One Day Internationals and three Tests.

The book progresses with the tour, providing detailed accounts of the matches and recounting the journeys and off-field encounters. It is illustrated with a number of colour photographs from the tour. The scorecards of all the matches played as well as the statistical records related to the tour are given at the end of the book. It includes a conversation with Intikhab Alam, the former Pakistani cricket captain, and interviews with Danish Kaneria, the Pakistani leg spinner, Sabih Azhar, Shoaib Akhtar's first coach, Aaqib Javed, the former Pakistani fast bowler, Andy Atkinson, the English pitch consultant who had been hired by the Pakistan Cricket Board, Abdul Qadir, the former Pakistani leg spinner, and Sourav Ganguly, the Indian captain on the tour.

The book briefly traces the cricketing relations between India and Pakistan over the years through Bhattacharya's conversations with cricketers, officials, and fellow journalists. It also alludes to politics and the historical relations between the two countries. Bhattacharya provides numerous accounts of Pakistani hospitality, narrating how taxi drivers and shopkeepers refused to charge fans that had come over from India. Peppered with deep insights and cricketing trivia, it is partly in the form of a travelogue and provides a fascinating account of contemporary Pakistan.

== Critical reception ==
Pundits from Pakistan won the 2005 Vodafone Crossword Book Award. It was selected among the top ten books published about the sport of cricket in the year 2005 by the staff at Cricinfo.

== Reviews ==
Mike Marqusee wrote of the book in Wisden Asia Cricket:

Thankfully Bhattacharya does not suffer the tunnel vision that is the occupational curse of the press box. On the contrary, the strength of his book is the sophisticated sensibility he brings to the experience of the tour as a whole. He conjures up the poetry of cheap hotels and late-night bus stands, the anguished search for cybercafes in provincial towns, the charm of fleeting but intense human encounters.

Above all, he is intensely aware that this series was about far more than cricket: the tour's most intense drama is found in the meeting between the two countries that the cricket facilitated. He pays tribute to the crowd at Karachi and the pride of Multanis but it's Lahore that steals his heart. "Those five magical days" spanning the pair of Lahore ODIs, he describes as "days of epiphanies, of closures, of small kindnesses and large, of rediscoveries and new discoveries ... For younger generations, it was an emphatic tearing down of stereotypes that had been fed to them, in their textbooks, their movies, their media." Fittingly, the book concludes with an anguished account of the militarist histrionics at the Wagah border crossing.

Pundits triumphantly demonstrates that genuine emotional involvement in cricket has nothing to do with the hysteria of national chauvinism. He is not out to prove a point about either country, but to chronicle and savour an encounter in which, for once, "India and Pakistan were playing without fright, playing with expressiveness.

Marcus Berkmann wrote of the book in The Wisden Cricketer:

Bhattacharya's prose style is rarely restrained but he really lets rip during the matches, with flurries of metaphor, simile and allusion. Like most of the batsmen he admires, he takes bold risks. Sometimes it works, sometimes not, sometimes both in the same sentence. Stylistically, at least, he is the anti-Swanton. But his judgements are remarkably sound and he knows his onions.
There are flaws. Pundits from Pakistan is, like nearly all books these days, too long; it often rambles; sometimes you have to read a paragraph three times to work out what he is talking about. But it has life and energy and youthful optimism and I salute it. Like the tour it describes, it is something a little bit special.
