= Cricinfo Magazine =

Defunct monthly cricket magazine (2006–2007)

Cricinfo Magazine was a monthly cricket magazine published by the Wisden Group from January 2006 to July 2007. Infomedia was the publisher. The magazine, focused on cricket in India, and co-branded with Cricinfo, replaced Wisden's previous Wisden Asia Cricket. The founding editorial team, led by Sambit Bal, was inherited from Wisden Cricket Asia. The magazine was discontinued after the July 2007 edition, shortly after ESPN acquired Cricinfo from Wisden in June 2007.

== See also ==
- The Wisden Cricketer — the Wisden Group's UK focused cricket magazine, which was sold to British Sky Broadcasting in April 2007
