= Jatindra =

Jatindra is a given name. Notable people with the name include:

- Jatindra Nath Banerjee (Niralamba Swami) (1877–1930), Indian nationalist and freedom fighter
- Jatindra Nath Das (1904–1929), Indian independence activist and revolutionary
- Jatindra Nath Duwara (1892–1964), poet of the Jonaki era of Assamese literature
- Jatindra Charan Guho (1892–1972), Indian professional wrestler trained in pehlwani wrestling
- Jatindra Nath Mukherjee(1879–1915), Indian independence activist
- Jatindra Kumar Nayak (born 1956), Indian translator, literary critic, columnist, editor and academic
- Jatindra Nath Pramanick (born 1907), Indian politician
- Jatindra Mohan Sengupta (1885–1933), Indian revolutionary against the British rule

== See also ==
- Jatindra Rajendra Mahavidyalaya, a general degree college of Amtala in Murshidabad district
