= Narayan (writer) =

Indian author (1940–2022)

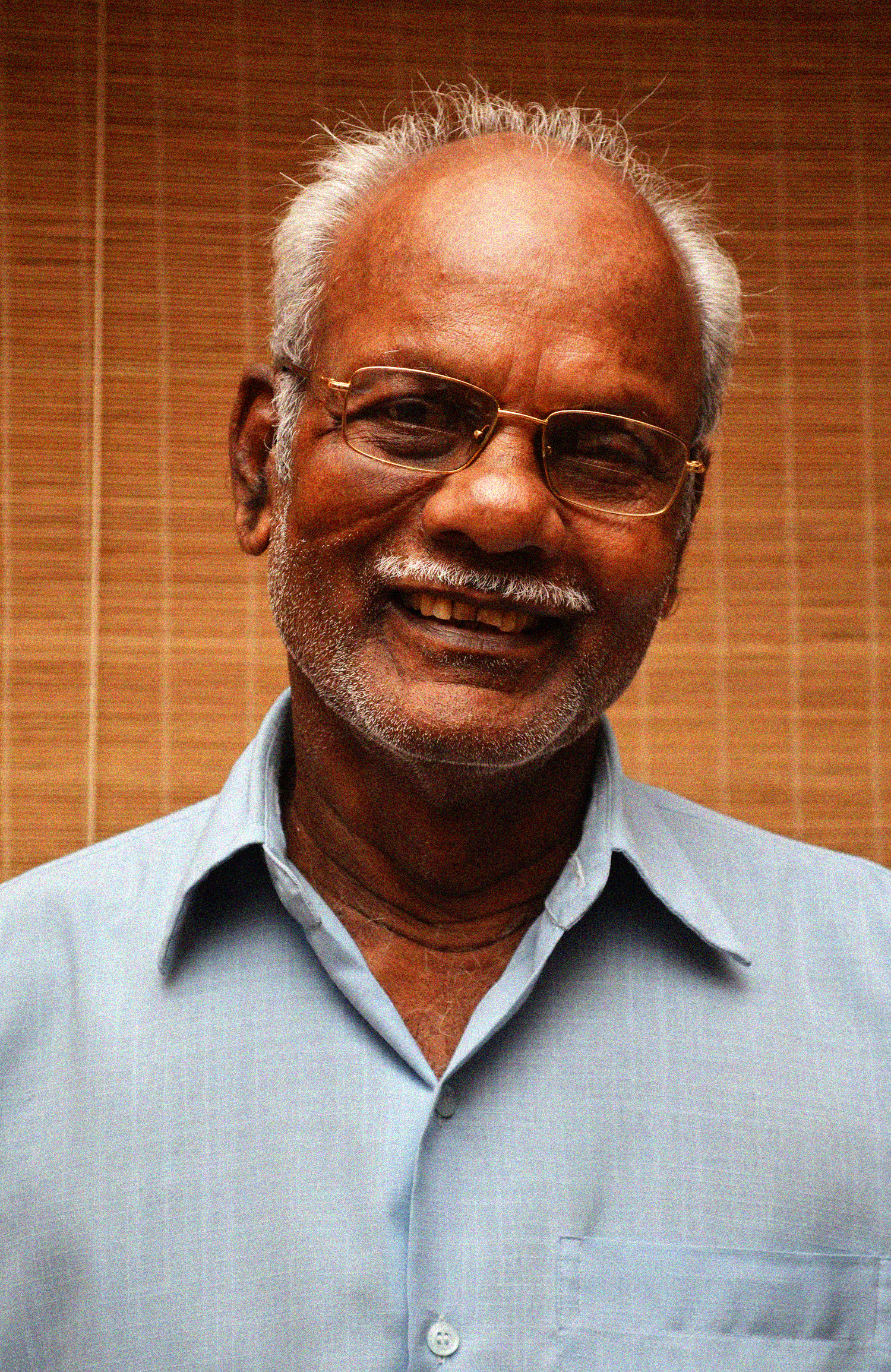
- Narayan in 2013
- Born: 26 September 1940; Kadayathoor Hills, Idukki, Travancore, British India
- Died: 16 August 2022 (aged 81); Kochi, Kerala, India
- Occupation: Writer
- Writing career
- Language: Malayalam
- Genres: Novel, short story
- Subject: Tribal communities of Kerala
- Notable work: Kocharethi
- Notable awards: Kerala Sahitya Akademi Award (1999); Economist Crossword Book Award (2011)

Narayan (26 September 1940 – 16 August 2022) was an Indian author best known for his debut novel Kocharethi (1998). Most of Narayan's novels deal with the lives of the tribal communities of Kerala. He belonged to the Malayarayar tribe and is considered Kerala's first tribal novelist.

== Early life ==
Narayan who was born in 1940 in Kudayathur, Idukki district, belonged to the tribe called Malayarayar. After completing his schooling from a local government school, he got a job in the postal service.

== Literary career ==
Circumstances. When I joined school the system of providing free rice gruel at noon hadn't started. Education was not free. Right until Independence, the school fee was a chakram per annum. I went without food at noon. One day someone said that if I remained in the class room when others left for lunch and something went missing, I would be blamed. This frightened me so I began to visit the reading room opposite our school. There were three or four newspapers, a few books and a periodical. Soon the owner began to leave me in charge of the place when he went for lunch. I used the time to read whatever I could get hold of.

— Narayan when asked what had triggered his interest in books.

Narayan started his literary career by writing a few short stories, which were published in periodicals. The writing did not attract the attention of readers but it did attract attention of the negative sort: of his immediate superior. With the publication of his debut novel Kocharethi in 1998, Narayan became Kerala's first tribal novelist. The novel, through the lives of its protagonist Kunjipennu and her childhood love and later husband, Kochuraman, depicts the history, traditions and travails of the Malayarayar tribal community in Kerala in the twentieth century. While Narayan completed the manuscript of the novel in 1988, it was published only ten years later by the DC Books. The novel was critically acclaimed and went on to win the Kerala Sahitya Akademi Award. Its English translation as Kocharethi: The Araya Woman by Catherine Thankamma was published by the Oxford University Press in 2011 and won the Economist Crossword Book Award in the Indian language translation category for 2011.

== Awards and recognitions ==
Kocharethi was given the Kerala Sahitya Akademi Award in the Novel category for the year 1999. The novel's English translation by Catherine Thankamma won the Economist Crossword Book Award in 2011. Narayan is also a recipient of many other awards including Thoppil Ravi Award and Abu Dhabi Sakthi Award.

Kocharethi has run into six editions in Malayalam and has been translated into Hindi as Pahadin and into all the south Indian languages. A French translation of the novel is also in progress.

== Death ==
Narayan died following COVID-19-related complications on 16 August 2022, at the age of 81.

== Works ==
Novels

- Kocharethi – (1998)
- Ooralikkudi – (1999)
- Chengarum Kuttalum – (2001)
- Vandanam – (2003)
- Tholkkunnavar Aaraanur – (2006)
- Ee Vazhiyil Aalere Illa – (2006)
- Thiraskrutharude Nalea – (2010)
- Manasum Dhehavum Kondu Njan Ninnea – (2010)
- Pennungal Paniyunna Nagaram – (2016)
- Vannalakal – (2016)
- Ee Vazhiyil Aalereyilla – (2016)

Short Story Collections

- Nissahayante Nilavili – (2006)
- Pela Marutha – (2006)
- Kadhakal Narayan – (2011)
- Narayante Theranjedutha Kadhakal – (2012)
- Narayante Kadhakal – (2013)

== List of awards ==
- Thoppil Ravi Foundation Award – (1999)
- Kerala Sahitya Akademi Award for Novel – (1999, for Kocharethi)
- Abu Dhabi Sakthi Award – (1999, for Kocharethi)
- Swami Ananda Theertha Award – (2011)
- Economist Crossword Book Award – (2011)
