= Payal Kapadia =

Payal Kapadia may refer to:

- Payal Kapadia (author), Indian children's writer
- Payal Kapadia (filmmaker), Indian filmmaker
