= Aalahayude Penmakkal =

1999 Malayalam novel by Sarah Joseph

- Cover page of the latest edition by Current Books
- Author: Sarah Joseph
- Original title: ആലാഹയുടെ പെണ്മക്കൾ
- Language: Malayalam
- Publisher: Current Books
- Publication date: 1999
- Publication place: India
- Pages: 152
- ISBN: 978-81-226-0946-2
- Preceded by: Thaikulam
- Followed by: Mattathi (Malayalam: മാറ്റാത്തി)

Aalahayude Penmakkal (English: Daughters of God the father) is a Malayalam novel written by Sarah Joseph and published in 1999. The novel is the first in the trilogy which includes 'Mattathi' and 'Othappu'. This novel gave widespread recognition to Sarah Joseph and her craft. 'Aalahayude Penmakkal' won the Kerala Sahitya Academy award of 2001, Kendra Sahitya Academy award of 2003, Vayalar Ramavarma award of 2004, and Cherukad Award of 2000. The novel deals with the condition of marginalized groups in society pointed out as subalterns by Marxist Antonio Gramsci. The living and existential conditions of these groups are seldom acknowledged by the society at large and generally they are displaced from their places of stay and livelihoods, usually in the name of development and change. This transformation in their existential struggle is narrated by Annie, the central character, who gives voice to three generations of her subaltern group albeit with a feminine perspective.

== Summary ==
The novel is narrated from the perspective of Annie, an eight-year-old child living in 'Kokkanchira'. 'Kokkanchira' is depicted as an undesirable place. Annie's school teachers are also shown chiding children from 'Kokkanchira' and showing general apathy and disgust. 'Kokkkanchira' is described as being a dumping ground for carcasses and dead bodies, before Annie and her family moved in there. 'Kokkanchira' is now inhabited by lowest of classes in the society. They are generally shown as people who are latrine cleaners, scavengers and belonging to dalit groups or other marginalized group of people that are shunned by higher class society. However Joseph also points out that the city of Thrissur needs the services of these groups even when the existential rights of these groups remain unacknowledged. The main theme of the novel is the displacement faced by such groups of people in the name of urbanization and development. Being from the lowest stratum, these people are easily moved from their habitual places of residences by the rich and become increasingly isolated in the middle of new pavements and multi-storied houses. Annie is witness to these changes taking place around her, in 'Kodichiangadi' and 'Kokkanchira'. She describes these changes affecting her and her family through her childlike eyes and perspective. Hence it is with childlike simplicity that she observes the demolition of a stretch of single-roomed houses to make way for a bungalow and the rise of a convent near to her own home, in a plot that used to be vacant.

There are two important instruments used by the author in this novel. These are 'Aalahayude Prarthana' or prayer of God the father and 'Amara Pandhal' or broad bean enclosure. The Aalaha’s prayer, and the amara pandhal are two interacting symbols that dominate and control the story. Early on in the novel Annie imagines that atop the bean stalk is a completely different world, which is magnificent and filled with delight. Later on it is shown that the a road roller dismantles almost half of the bean stalk enclosure, while surfacing a pathway. It allegorically refers to the demolition of Annie's dreams by the symbol of change and development- The road roller. The second instrument is the 'Aalahayude prathana'. Annie hopes that one day she will come in possession of 'Aalahas' prayer which has the power to exorcise evil, from her grandmother and by which she may change her circumstance. Towards the end of the novel she becomes the sole possessor of the 'Aalahas' prayer recited to her by her grandmother, but she has also become the sole possessor of her people’s subculture and damnation.

== Main characters ==
- Annie: The eight-year-old girl through whose eyes the story unfolds.
- Ammama: Annie's grandmother, who claims sole knowledge of the "Aalaha's Prayer", which has the power to drive away evil.
- Kochu Rothu: Annie's mother.
- Kuttippapan: Annie's uncle, suffering from tuberculosis.
- Velliamma, Cherichi Ammai, Chinnamma, Chiyyamma: Annie's aunts.
