= Rahul Bhattacharya =

Indian journalist and novelist (born 1979)

Rahul Bhattacharya (born 1979) is an Indian journalist and novelist.

== Biography ==
Bhattacharya was born in 1979, in Mumbai, and lived briefly as a baby in Kolkata. His father was Bengali, though born and raised in the small towns of Uttar Pradesh, in the north, and interior Maharashtra, in the centre. His mother was Gujarati, born and raised in Bombay. From about the age of three until the age of nine, Bhattacharya lived in Secunderabad – "the kind of town where houses might have wells in the backyard and goats at the gate." In 1988, the family moved back to Mumbai, where Bhattacharya studied in English. He graduated from college with a degree in mathematics, although he admits to having "little recollection of it".

Bhattacharya's first book is Pundits from Pakistan: On Tour with India, 2003-04 (2005), a non-fiction work about the Indian cricket team's tour of Pakistan in the year 2004. While the book is largely about cricket, it also tells of how the tour had an impact that went beyond sub-continental cricket in terms of the goodwill and sense of bonhomie it created between the people of the two countries, thereby encouraging peaceful relations. It was the first major sporting encounter between India and Pakistan in 15 years, a period when the two countries had fought a war. It won the 2005 Vodafone Crossword Book Award in the Popular Award category. In 2010 it was voted number four of the Ten Best Cricket Books of all time in The Wisden Cricketer. It was shortlisted for the Cricket Society Award.

Bhattacharya's second book is a novel set in Guyana, entitled The Sly Company of People Who Care. Widely praised, it has drawn him a host of comparisons to V. S. Naipaul. Ondaatje Prize judge Nick Laird said he had "seldom read a book with so much energy", while fellow judge Michèle Roberts called it "one of the most exhilarating novels I have read for years" and praised the author's invention of "a beautiful and original language, mixing street poetry and sharply sensual poetry". Kamila Shamsie, also on the judging panel, said "the combination of Bhattacharya's prose style, his great curiosity and generous-though-not-uncritical eye, the light touch with which he conveys knowledge, and the sheer pleasure of his company". It won the Hindu Literary Prize (2011), the Ondaatje Prize (2012) and a Kirkus Reviews fiction Book of the Year. It was shortlisted for the Man Asian Literary Prize (2011), Commonwealth Writers' Prize (2012).

A cricket journalist since 2000, Bhattacharya is now a contributing editor with Wisden Asia Cricket and has been writing for the Wisden Cricketers' Almanack since 2003. He also writes for The Guardian. In 2025, his novel Railsong was published.

== Works ==
- Pundits from Pakistan: On Tour with India, 2003–04 (2005)
- The Sly Company of People Who Care (2011)
- Railsong (2025)
