= 2006–07 NKP Salve Challenger Trophy =

NKP Salve Challenger Trophy 2006/07
- Date: 1st – 4th October 2006
- Location: Chennai, Tamil Nadu, India
- Result: India Blue and India Red as joint winners.
- Player of the series: VRV Singh (India Red)
Teams
India Blue	India Red	India Green
Captains
(India) Rahul Dravid	(India) Venugopal Rao	(India) Mohammad Kaif
Most runs
Sachin Tendulkar (200)	Gautam Gambhir (184)	Parthiv Patel (112)
Most wickets
Munaf Patel (5) Irfan Pathan (5)	VRV Singh (7)	Lakshmipathy Balaji (4)

The 12th NKP Salve Challenger Trophy was an Indian domestic cricket tournament that was held in Chennai from 1 October to 4 October 2006. The series involved the domestic players from India who were placed accordingly in the teams namely India Blue, India Red, and India Green. From this edition, the names of teams were changed from the previous edition where India Seniors, India A, and India B became India Blue, India Red, and India Green respectively.

The trophy was jointly shared by India Blue and India Red after the final was abandoned due to rain.

== Squads ==
India Blue	India Red	India Green
Rahul Dravid (c); Virender Sehwag; Sachin Tendulkar; Yuvraj Singh; Dinesh Mongia; Wasim Jaffer; MS Dhoni (wk); Irfan Pathan; Ravindra Jadeja; Harbhajan Singh; Ajit Agarkar; Munaf Patel; Rudra Pratap Singh; Coach: Ian Frazer	Venugopal Rao (c); Gautam Gambhir; Robin Uthappa; Subramaniam Badrinath; Rohit Sharma; Tejinder Pal Singh; Dinesh Karthik (wk); VRV Singh; Sreesanth; Ramesh Powar; Zaheer Khan; Murali Kartik; C. Raghu; Coach: Robin Singh	Mohammad Kaif (c); Sourav Ganguly; Mithun Manhas; Hemang Badani; Suresh Raina; Tanmay Srivastava; Piyush Chawla; Parthiv Patel (wk); Ashish Nehra; Lakshmipathy Balaji; Praveen Kumar; Reetinder Sodhi; Saurasish Lahiri; Coach: Lalchand Rajput: ~~VVS Laxman~~

- Mithun Manhas replaced VVS Laxman in the India Green squad, after he was ruled out due to a strained hamstring ahead of the tournament.

== Points Table ==
Pos	Team	Pld	W	L	NR	Pts	NRR
1	India Red	2	2	0	0	8	0.382
2	India Blue	2	1	1	0	4	1.247
3	India Green	2	0	2	0	0	−1.754

Source: 'Points Table'

== Matches ==
=== Group stage ===
1 October 2006

India Red; 280 (50 overs)	v	India Blue; 259 (47.3 overs)
Gautam Gambhir 110 (119); Munaf Patel 3/49 (10 overs)		Sachin Tendulkar 61 (70); VRV Singh 3/49 (10 overs)

India Red won by 21 runs.
M. A. Chidambaram Stadium, Chennai
Umpires: Sameer Bandekar (IND) and Shavir Tarapore (IND)

- India Red won the toss and elected to bat.
- Points: India Red 4, India Blue 0

2 October 2006

India Blue; 381/6 (50 overs)	v	India Green; 115 (26.4 overs)
Sachin Tendulkar 139 (100); Lakshmipathy Balaji 2/62 (10 overs)		Parthiv Patel 43 (38); Harbhajan Singh 4/10 (4.4 overs)

India Blue won by 266 runs.
M. A. Chidambaram Stadium, Chennai
Umpires: Jasbir Singh (IND) and Ravi Subramanian (IND)

- India Blue won the toss and elected to bat.
- Points: India Blue 4, India Green 0

3 October 2006

India Red; 317/4 (50 overs)	v	India Green; 278 (48.4 overs)
Robin Uthappa 92 (99); Lakshmipathy Balaji 2/68 (10 overs)		Parthiv Patel 69 (80); VRV Singh 4/54 (7.4 overs)

India Red won by 39 runs.
M. A. Chidambaram Stadium, Chennai
Umpires: Jasbir Singh (IND) and Shavir Tarapore (IND)

- India Red won the toss and elected to bat.
- Points: India Red 4, India Green 0

== Final ==
4 October 2006

India Blue; 210/4 (31.2 overs)	v	India Red
Virender Sehwag 90* (81); Zaheer Khan 2/32 (6 overs)

No Result.
M. A. Chidambaram Stadium, Chennai
Umpires: Ravi Subramanian (IND) and Sameer Bandekar (IND)

- India Blue won the toss and elected to bat.
- Rain stopped play during India Blue's innings and no further play was possible.
- The trophy was jointly shared by India Blue and India Red.
