= Kocharethi =

Book by Narayan

- Author: Narayan
- Translator: Catherine Thankamma
- Language: English, Malayalam
- Genre: Novel
- Published: 1998 (D C Books)
- Publication place: India
- Media type: Print (hardcover)

Kocharethi (Malayalam: കൊച്ചരേത്തി) is a Malayalam novel by Narayan, often described as Kerala’s first tribal novelist, that was published in 1998. The novel, through the lives of its protagonist Kunjupennu and her childhood love and later husband, Kochuraman, depicts the history, traditions and travails of the Malay Arayan tribal community in Kerala in the twentieth century. While Narayan completed the manuscript of the novel in 1988, it was published only ten years later by the D C Books. The novel was critically acclaimed and went on to win the Kerala Sahitya Akademi Award.

== Synopsis ==
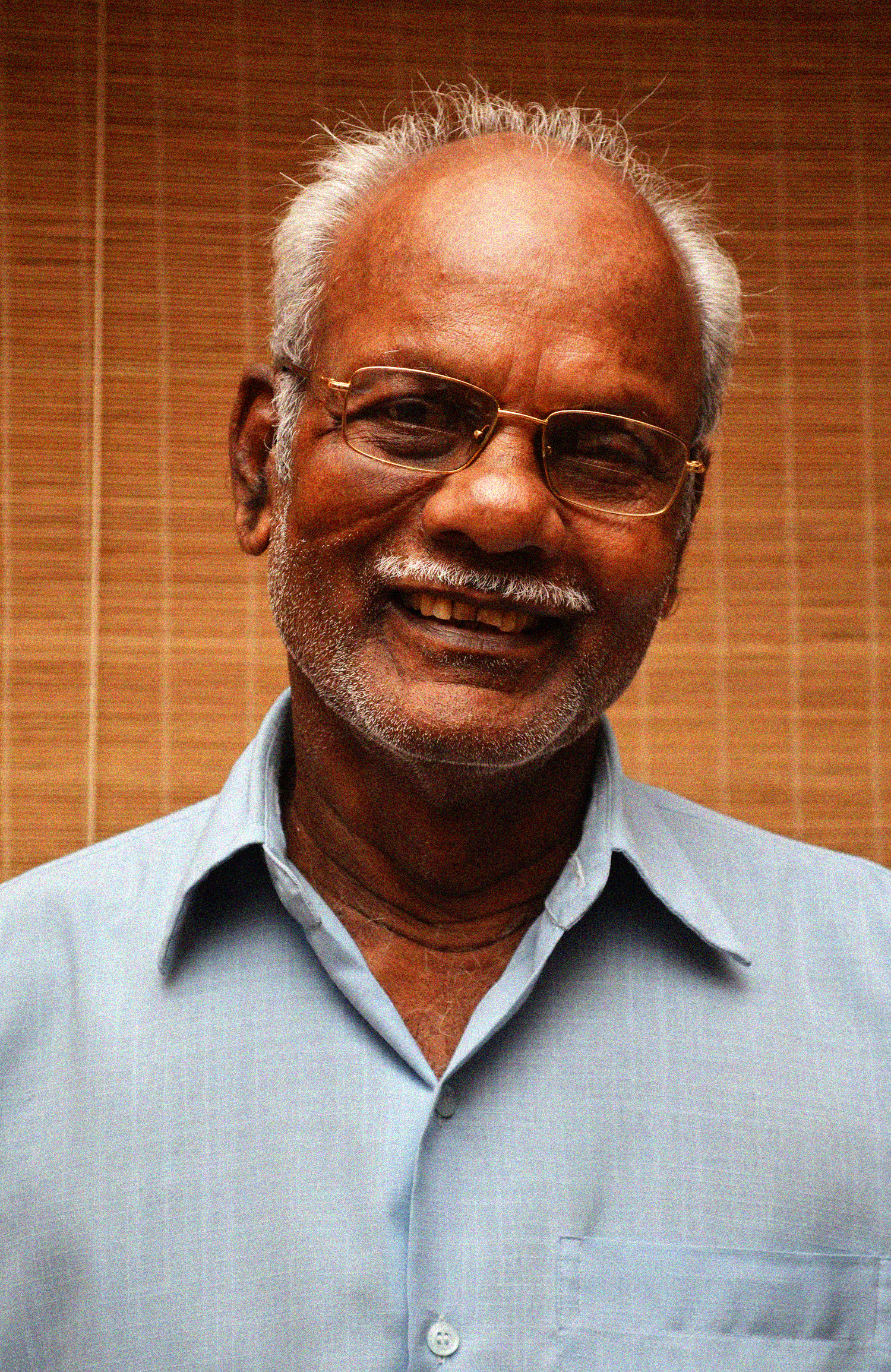
Narayan is one of the first tribal novelists from India.

Kocharethi narrates the tale of the Mala Araya adivasi community in the early half of the twentieth century through the lives of Kunjipennu and her husband Kochuraman. It is set against the backdrop of the Western Ghats in the pepper belt along the Kerala – Tamil Nadu border.

A key theme of cultural change begins when Kunjipennu refuses to marry her maternal uncle's son and instead weds Kochuraman. Following the destruction of their house and the death of their son in a forest fire, they are pushed into dire poverty. A cycle of drought and torrential rain pushes the entire Mala Arayan community into debt and alcoholism to which Kochuraman too falls prey.

The poverty of the community is ruthlessly exploited by moneylenders, landlords, the businessmen and the police and gradually this unholy nexus of the upper classes and upper castes results in the alienation of the Arayans' lands and those resisting are beaten into submission.

Kunjipennu and Kochuraman meanwhile have a daughter, Parvati and the establishment of a school in the village marks the beginning of another social transformation in the community. Parvati later gets through college and finds a job in Kochi where she marries against her parents' wishes and slowly begins to distance herself from the community.

Kochuraman's alcoholism finally results in his taking ill and is forced to seek treatment in Kochi where Kunjipennu accompanies him. His hospitalisation is supported by Parvati's husband and friends but when Kochuraman and Kunjipennu are told that he will require surgery they, mortally scared of modern medicine, escape from the hospital.

== Reception ==
Kocharethi, Narayan's debut novel, won the Kerala Sahitya Akademi Award in 1998. Its English translation as Kocharethi: The Araya Woman by Catherine Thankamma was published by the Oxford University Press in 2011 and won the Economist-Crossword Book Award in the Indian language translation category for 2011. The novel has run into six editions in Malayalam and has been translated into Hindi as Pahadin and into all the south Indian languages. A French translation of the novel is also in progress.

The novel has however been criticised on the grounds of having neither style nor craft. It has also been pointed out that structural and stylistic techniques literary writing are largely absent in the novel. The award for the novel was decried by some as having been a politically motivated award. The English version of the novel is also on the course on Subaltern Studies at the University of Calgary in Canada.
