= Two Lives =

Two Lives may refer to:

- Two Lives (Seth book), a book by Vikram Seth about the romance of his great-uncle and great-aunt
- Two Lives (novel), a pair of novellas by William Trevor sold as a single book
- Two Lives, a 2007 book by Janet Malcolm
- Two Lives (film), a 2012 German film
- Two Lives (song), a single by Example
- "Two Lives", a single by Bonnie Raitt from Sweet Forgiveness, also covered by The Carpenters
