= Karan Bajaj =

Indian writer

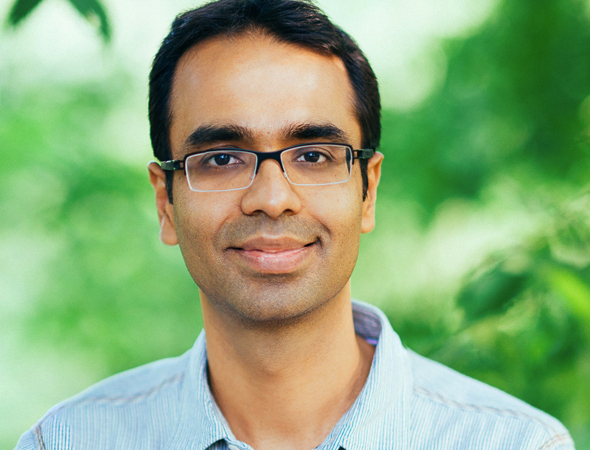
- Portrait of Karan Bajaj
- Born: 30 June 1979 (age 47); India
- Education: Indian Institute of Management, Bangalore; Birla Institute of Technology, Mesra
- Occupations: Entrepreneur; Novelist
- Writing career
- Years active: 2008–present
- Notable works: Keep Off The Grass (2008); Johnny Gone Down (2010); The Seeker (2015); The Yoga of Max's Discontent,
- Website: karanbajaj.com

Karan Bajaj is an Indian technology entrepreneur and author. He is best known as founder and CEO of WhiteHat Jr., an Edtech company specializing in distance learning which was acquired by BYJU'S in 2020.

Bajaj is also the author of four novels.

== Early life ==
Karan Bajaj was born in India, where he was brought up in a family with military roots. He has a master's degree in Business Administration from Indian Institute of Management, Bangalore and a B.E degree in Mechanical Engineering from Birla Institute of Technology, Mesra.

== Career ==
In his early career, Bajaj worked for Procter & Gamble, The Boston Consulting Group and Kraft Foods. In 2016, he moved to Mumbai as CEO of Discovery Networks, where he headed Discovery Channel, TLC, Animal Planet and Discovery Kids in South Asia. He left Discovery Networks in 2019.

=== Whitehat Jr ===
In 2018, Bajaj started WhiteHat Jr, an online educational company initially aimed at improving children's coding and math skills. In 2020, the firm was acquired for $300 million by BYJU'S and integrated into their coding teaching division. After the acquisition, he led Byju's International division, Byju's FutureSchool, launching programs in English, Spanish and Portuguese for the US, Brazil and Mexico students with new courses including music, English, fine arts and science. Bajaj left the company in August 2021. Now Trupti Mukker the head of customer experience and delivery, will take over as CEO of White HatJr.

=== Authorship ===
Bajaj is the author of several books. Keep Off The Grass is Bajaj's debut book first published in 2008, about a psychedelic road trip of a 25-year-old Yale graduate through the length and breadth of India. The journey is made by a youngster protagonist named Samrat, born to immigrant parents in the U.S. who decides to go out in search of his roots. Along the way, Samrat is jailed for possession of marijuana, develops a drug addiction, meditates in the foothills of the Himalayas, has a one-night stand with a hippie in Dharamsala and meets flesh-eating Aghoree saints on the banks of Varanasi.

Bajaj's second novel, Johnny Gone Down, is a thriller published by HarperCollins in 2010. The novel's narrative is focused on the "bizarre, almost surreal series of events that transform an MIT graduate into first a genocide survivor, then a Buddhist monk, a drug lord, a homeless accountant, a software mogul, and a deadly game fighter over a period of twenty years."

The Seeker, was a third book published by Penguin Random House in June 2015. The novel is about an investment banker in New York who embarks on a quest to become a yogi in the Himalayas. The plot was inspired by Bajaj's one-year sabbatical traveling from Europe to India, learning Hath yoga in an ashram in India, and practicing meditation in the Himalayas.

Bajaj's works have been noted and reviewed by various publications and literary critics, including Kirkus Reviews, Publishers Weekly, Chicago Tribune and Indiaplaza, among others. His book "Keep off the Grass" reached the semi-finals of the Amazon Breakthrough Novel Award and was on the shortlist of the Indiaplaza Golden Quill Book Awards in 2008.

Kevin Nance from the Chicago Tribune wrote on "The Yoga of Max's Discontent": "If being a Wall Street banker doesn't seem conducive to a life of stillness, solitude and meditation — if the concept of selflessness, in all its implications, seems foreign to the ethos of New York City — then the course of "The Yoga of Max's Discontent," by the Indian-American novelist Karan Bajaj, will seem natural, if not inevitable."

== Publications ==
=== Books ===
- Bajaj, Karan (2008). Keep Off the Grass. Harper Collins. ISBN 978-9-350-29287-7. by HarperCollins
- Bajaj, Karan (2010). Johnny Gone Down. Harper Collins. ISBN 978-9-350-29494-9. by HarperCollins
- Bajaj, Karan (2015). The Seeker. Penguin Books Limited. ISBN 978-9-352-14037-4. by Penguin Random House
- Bajaj, Karan (2016). The Yoga of Max's Discontent. Penguin. ISBN 978-0-698-19204-1. by Penguin Random House
  - Translated into Czech as *Max a hledání vyšší pravdy

=== Adaptations ===
The copyrights for the Keep off the Grass screen adaptation were sold to Mosaic Media Group in 2009 with Ben Rekhi signed up as director. In 2017, Ronnie Screwvala and Ashi Dua were signed on as co-producers for the screen adaptation of Johnny Gone Down.

== Personal life ==
Karan has two daughters.
