= Aalohari Anandam =

2013 novel by Sarah Joseph

- First edition
- Author: Sarah Joseph
- Language: Malayalam
- Published: 26 December 2013, Current Books, Thrissur
- Publication place: India
- Media type: Print

Aalohari Anandam (Per Capita Happiness) is a Malayalam-language novel by Sarah Joseph published in 2013. The novel was originally serialised in Mathrubhumi Weekly.

== Plot summary ==
Set in a large Christian household, Aalohari Anandam dissects different faces of man-woman relationships, as well as sexual orientation. Its story deals with the homosexuality of a married woman and its impact in her life and society.

== Release ==
The novel was released at a function at the Kerala Sahitya Akademi in Thrissur on 26 December 2013. Writer M. Mukundan handed over the first copy of the book to literary critic S. Saradakutty. The Novel Market Price is Rs. 500.00.
