= Cricinfo =

Sports news website for cricket

- Screenshot Screenshot of the home page as of September 2026
- Website type: Sports website exclusively for Cricket
- Available in: English; Hindi; Tamil; Kannada
- Headquarters: Bengaluru, India
- Owner: JioStar
- Key people: Sambit Bal (Editor-in-chief)
- Website: Official website
- Commercial: Yes
- Registration: Optional
- Launched: 15 March 1993
- Current status: Active

Cricinfo (formerly known as CricInfo and ESPNcricinfo) is a sports news website dedicated exclusively to the game of cricket. The site features news, articles, live coverage of cricket matches (including liveblogs and scorecards), and StatsGuru, a database of historical matches and players spanning from the 18th century to the present.

The site, originally named as CricInfo, was originally conceived in a pre-World Wide Web form in 1993 by Simon King. Wisden Group acquired a majority stake in the company in 2003. As part of an eventual break-up of the Wisden Group, it was sold in 2007 to ESPN, jointly owned by The Walt Disney Company and Hearst Communications, and the site was renamed as ESPNcricinfo. In November 2024, it became part of JioStar group, after Disney India's assets were merged with Viacom18, owned by Reliance Industries. In June 2026, the site announced that it is being renamed as Cricinfo.

== History ==
=== Formation and early years (1993–1999) ===
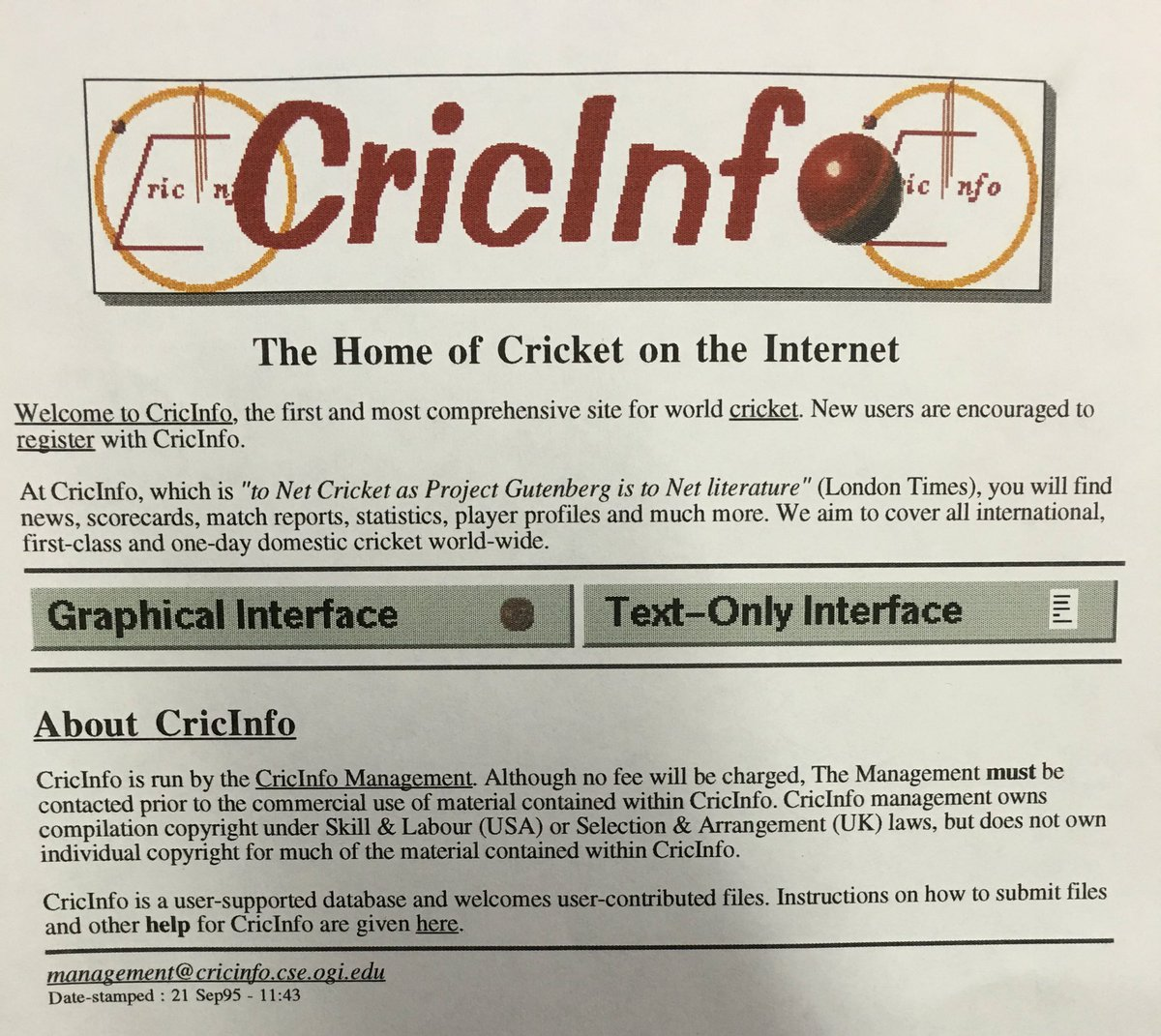
CricInfo in 1995

In the early 1990s, cricket fans outside cricket-playing nations, especially in the United States, had limited access to cricket-related news and scorecards. CricInfo was launched on 15 March 1993 by British researcher Simon King. It was designed as a computer bot that enabled cricket-related information to be shared through Usenet newsgroups, e-mail mailing lists, and Internet Relay Chat (IRC). Volunteers shared scorecards, match summaries, and other cricket related information.

Cricinfo also began updating scorecards of historical matches, which eventually formed the foundation of StatsGuru, the statistics archive of Cricinfo. Cricinfo moved from IRC to a Gopher-based system at the University of Minnesota, and later to the World Wide Web. The domain name Cricinfo.com was registered in 1995. King organized the early teams, and designed the database and the structure of the website. Cricinfo partnered with Real Broadcast Networks to provide one of the earliest online streams of cricket matches.

Cricinfo became the official site for providing scores and live updates for the 1996 Cricket World Cup. It was incorporated as a company in the United Kingdom in 1997, and King and Badri Seshadri became its first directors. Initial funding for the company came from volunteers, and the International Cricket Council (ICC). In 1998, Sportal invested in the company, after which it was funded through advertising revenue and sponsorships. The company managed the official websites of Cricket South Africa and Zimbabwe Cricket.

=== Growth and acquisition by Wisden (2000–2006) ===
Cricinfo experienced significant growth in the late 1990s during the peak of the dotcom boom, and in 2000, Satyam Infoway bought a 25% stake in the company for $37 million. In 2000, the company was estimated to be worth $150 million; however it faced difficulties the following year as a result of the dotcom crash. Cricinfo was named as the title sponsor of the 2000 Women's Cricket World Cup by the ICC. In 2001, The Ashes cricket tournament was streamed on the website. Later that year, Cricinfo recorded more than one billion pageviews for the year.

In 2003, Wisden Group acquired a two-thirds stake in Cricinfo for an estimated $3 million, and merged the operations of Wisden Online with Cricinfo. In December 2005, Wisden re-launched its recently discontinued Wisden Asia Cricket magazine as Cricinfo Magazine, a magazine dedicated to coverage of Indian cricket. In 2006, the company had a reported annual revenue of £3m.

=== ESPNcricinfo and later years (2007–present) ===
In June 2007, ESPN Inc. announced the acquisition of Cricinfo from the Wisden Group. The terms of the acquisition were not disclosed and the acquisition was intended to help further expand Cricinfo by combining the site with ESPN's other web properties, with the website renamed to ESPNcricinfo. Since 2007, the company started awarding the annual ESPNcricinfo Awards for the best performers in international cricket.

In November 2024, Cricinfo became part of the JioStar group, a joint venture between Disney India, Reliance Industries and the latter's subsidiary Viacom18, following the merger of Viacom18's assets with Disney Star. In June 2026, the ESPN branding was dropped from the site, changing its name back to simply Cricinfo.

== Features ==
Cricinfo hosts various cricket-related news, columns, blogs, videos and fantasy sports. Among its most popular feature are its liveblogs of cricket matches, which includes the scorecard and various graphical representations. For each international match, the live scores are accompanied by a bulletin, and post-match report. Cricinfo 3D generated a 3D animated simulation of a live match using the available details.

Regular columns on Cricinfo include "All Today's Yesterdays", an "On this day" column focusing on historical cricket events, and "Quote Unquote", which features notable quotes from cricketers and cricket administrators. "Ask Steven" is a weekly column, published on Tuesdays, in which author Steven Lynch answers questions related to cricket. "The Light Roller" and "The Briefing" contain satire on cricket's recent events.

StatsGuru is a database originally created by Travis Basevi, containing statistics on players, officials, teams, information about cricket boards, details of future tournaments, individual teams, and records. In May 2014, ESPNcricinfo launched CricIQ, an online test to challenge every fan's cricket knowledge. In September 2021, ESPNCricinfo launched AskCricinfo, a natural language search tool to help in exploring cricket stats.

Cricinfo publishes The Cricket Monthly, which claims to be the world's first digital-only cricket magazine, and the first issue was published in August 2014.

== See also ==
- Cricbuzz
- CricketArchive
