= Sunanda K. Datta-Ray =

Indian journalist (born 1937)

- Born: 13 December 1937 (age 88); Calcutta, British India
- Education: Manchester University
- Occupation: Journalist
- Spouse: Sumita Married (once)
- Children: 1

Sunanda K. Datta-Ray (born 13 December 1937) is an Indian journalist. He was editor of The Statesman (Calcutta and New Delhi). The last non owner-editor of an Indian media house, he was however the first Indian to write for the International Herald Tribune. He also contributed to Time. He was the first and only Indian editor-in-Residence at the East-West Center in Honolulu. He was the only Indian and non-Singaporean editorial consultant to Singapore's The Straits Times newspaper, and a professor at Singapore's Wee Kim Wee School. Earlier he worked in Singapore in the mid-1970s with S. R. Nathan. Datta-Ray is a supernumerary fellow of Corpus Christi College, Oxford.

Datta-Ray's last book was written with Lee Kuan Yew under an appointment at the Institute of Southeast Asian Studies. The monograph is based on a series of one-on-one conversations with Lee and a host of classified documents. The book was published in 2009 as Looking East to Look West: Lee Kuan Yew's Mission India and won that year's Vodafone Crossword Book Award.

== Personal history ==
Datta Ray was born 13 December 1937 in kolkata, and educated at La Martiniere for Boys School, Kolkata. Datta-Ray qualified as a chartered accountant in England, but began working as a journalist at the age of 19.

In 1958 he was with the Stockport Advertiser, and in 1959 with the Northern Echo. In 1960 he joined The Statesman as junior London correspondent. In 1960–62 he was The Statesman's roving features editor, and 1962–68 the Sunday Magazine editor. In 1980–1986 he rose to be Deputy editor and became editor in 1986.

A Hindu – though his mother is of the Brahmo Samaj – Datta-Ray had a Catholic wedding in Australia to Sumita, the daughter of the industrialist Sachin Saha, founder of Bharat Battery. They met in Sydney.

Datta-Ray sees himself as the product of the intermeshing of high-caste Bengali society and upper-class English society throughout the 18th and 19th centuries which, writes Datta-Ray, has now 'vanished'. Known as the Ingabanga, Datta-Ray defined his society thus:

It meant "England-worshipping Bengali" for Rabindranath Tagore. Krishna Dutta and W. Andrew Robinson translated it as "Anglomaniacs". It was always an outsider's description, never used by anglicised Bengalis themselves. Born in the heartland of that world, my grandmother spoke always of "the set".

Datta-Ray is a direct descendant of B.L.Gupta who, in 1869, became an early Indian member of the Indian Civil Service. Datta-Ray's grandfather, K.P. Basu, went to Downing College, Cambridge and Basu's sister is the mother of India's former Chief of Army Staff Shankar Roychowdhury. Another ancestor is Jatin Sen Gupta and his wife the English woman Nellie Sengupta who was a President of the Indian National Congress.

== Monographs ==
Datta-Ray has been published in Asia, Europe and the United States for over 40 years. He was asked to contribute to Penguin's book of 'new' Indian writing in 2005. In addition to this Datta-Ray has penned four monographs and edited one. His "Didima: The Last Ingabanga" appears in the Penguin anthology First Proof: The Penguin Book of New Writing from India, vol. I.

Datta-Ray's monograph Looking East to Look West: Lee Kuan Yew's Mission India (2009) charts aspects of Indian foreign policy with Singapore. Completely overlooked by academics, Singapore was also ignored by successive Indian prime ministers. Yet, Singapore is today the conduit for the bulk of foreign investment into India. Based on unique access to key decision makers including Lee Kuan Yew, and Datta-Ray for the first time, it illuminates an essential aspect of Indian foreign relations on which hinges not only India's renewal but also the future of India's major foreign policy innovation since Non-Alignment—the 'Look East' policy.

He wrote the monograph Waiting For America about which a reviewer wrote:

[A] huge book ... Datta-Ray is one of India's most respected journalists. An elegant writer with an eye for story-telling and a no–nonsense analytical pen, he traces the course of Indo-US ties from the time Indira Gandhi opened them in 1982. We in India lack contemporary history of the digestible, Datta-Ray kind. This book will sit well on our shelves. We would do well to ponder the implications of Datta-Ray's analysis: Indo-US ties will be stilted as long as Americans see Pakistan as a strategic asset; India's strongest asset is its economy, hobbled by its domestic politics.

Earlier Datta-Ray published Bihar Shows the Way, a caustic take on India and edited Issues and Challenges in Asian Journalism

Smash And Grab: The Annexation of Sikkim (1984) is based on his personal friendships with the King of Sikkim and Indian decision makers. As the book described the process of the annexation of the Kingdom of Sikkim by the Indian government of Indira Gandhi in 1975, as "imperialism" it was banned in India.
