= Saurasish Lahiri =

Indian cricketer (born 1981)

Personal information
- Full name: Saurasish Sukanta Lahiri
- Born: 9 September 1981 (age 45); Howrah, West Bengal, India
- Nickname: Patsy
- Batting: Right-handed
- Bowling: Right arm offbreak
- Role: All rounder

Domestic team information
- Years: Team
- 1999/2000–2014/15: Bengal

Career statistics
Competition	FC	LA	T20
Matches	100	76	22
Runs scored	2240	505	124
Batting average	19.31	13.28	8.85
100s/50s	2/6	0/0	0/0
Top score	108	40	44
Balls bowled	19257	3726	438
Wickets	256	68	25
Bowling average	37.48	39.39	19.64
5 wickets in innings	11	1	0
10 wickets in match	2	0	0
Best bowling	7/62	5/43	3/20
Catches/stumpings	20/0	17/0	9/0
- Source: ESPNcricinfo, 17 October 2015

Saurasish Sukanta Lahiri (born 9 September 1981) is an Indian former first-class cricketer who played for Bengal. He has played a 100 FC, 76 List A and 22 T20 matches for Bengal and was the captain of the team for 4 matches. He was also one of the first 5 players picked up before the 2008 IPL auction by the Kolkata Knight Riders. His most famous achievement was taking the wicket of Sachin Tendulkar twice in the same match during the 2006-07 Ranji trophy final and also during the 2006-07 NKP Salve Challenger trophy match between India Blue and India Green. He is currently the coach of the Bengal U19 cricket team for all formats and was also the coach of Bengal U23 team which was the runner-up of the 2018 edition of C.K. Nayudu Trophy and won the National U23 One day trophy in 2019. He was also the assistant coach when Bengal was the runner's up for the 2022-23 edition of the Ranji trophy. He was also appointed as the bowling coach of India B for the Duleep Trophy 2024 season. In June 2016 he announced his retirement from all forms of cricket.In 2026 Saurasish appointed as bowling coach of Emerging India team.
