= Kalpana Swaminathan =

Indian writer (born 1956)

Kalpana Swaminathan (born 1956) is an Indian writer from Mumbai. She also writes with Ishrat Syed as Kalpish Ratna. Swaminathan and Syed are both surgeons. Swaminathan won the 2009 Vodafone Crossword Book Award (Fiction) for Venus Crossing: Twelve Stories of Transit.

== Bibliography ==
- 1993: The True Adventures of Prince Teentang
- 1994: Dattatray's Dinosaur and Other Stories
- 1997: Cryptic Death
- 2000: Ordinary Mr Pai Two Urban Fairy Tales
- 2002: The Weekday Sisters
- 2002: Gavial Avial
- 2003: Ambrosia for Afters
- 2003: Jaldi's Friends
- 2006: The Page Three Murders
- 2006: Bougainvillea House
- 2007: The Gardener's Song
- 2009: Venus Crossing: Twelve Stories of Transit
- 2010: The Monochrome Madonna
- 2012: I Never Knew It Was You
- 2013: The Secret Gardner
- 2017: Greenlight

== Awards and honors ==
- 2009: Vodafone Crossword Book Award, winner, Venus Crossing
- 2010: The Hindu Best Fiction Award, shortlist, Venus Crossing
