= Anita Agnihotri =

Indian Bengali writer and poet (born 1956)

Anita Agnihotri অনিতা অগ্নিহোত্রী
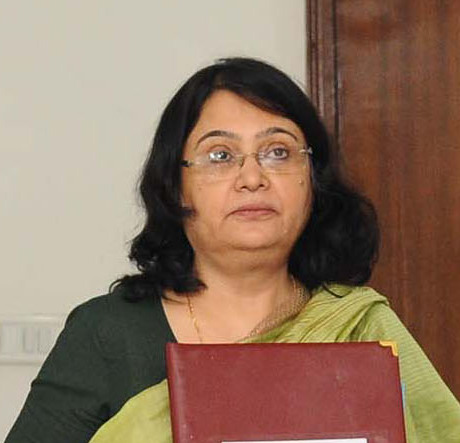
- Born: 24 September 1956 (age 70); Calcutta, West Bengal, India
- Citizenship: Indian
- Occupations: Author, retired civil servant
- Website: www.anitaagnihotri.com

Anita Agnihotri (Bengali: অনিতা অগ্নিহোত্রী; born 24 September 1956) is an Indian Bengali writer and poet. Her works have been translated into several major Indian and foreign languages, including English, Swedish and German.

== Early life and education ==
Anita Agnihotri (née Chatterjee) was born and spent her childhood in Kolkata. She earned a Bachelor of Arts in economics at Presidency College in Kolkata, and graduated with a master's in economics from Calcutta University.

== Career ==
She was selected for the Indian Administrative Service (IAS) in 1980 to the Odisha cadre. She went on to have a 37-year career in the civil service. As an IAS, she was Collector of Sundargarh district of Odisha and was Principal Secretary in Departments of Textiles and Industries. In 1991, she took a sabbatical from IAS and completed master's in development economics from the University of East Anglia.

At the centre, she was a Joint Director General in Directorate General of Foreign Trade (DGFT) between 1996 and 2001, and then Development Commissioner of SEEPZ, Mumbai in 2008–2011 at the rank of Joint Secretary. She was also the member secretary of the National Commission for Women. She retired in 2016 as Secretary, Ministry of Social Justice and Empowerment, Government of India.

=== Writing ===
Anita commenced writing at an early age. The writer Bimal Kar encouraged her to pursue a literary career. As a school student, she used to write for renowned filmmaker Satyajit Ray's children's magazine Sandesh, something that gave her confidence and also shaped her literary sensibilities. Her writing has been compared with that of noted Bengali writer Mahasweta Devi.

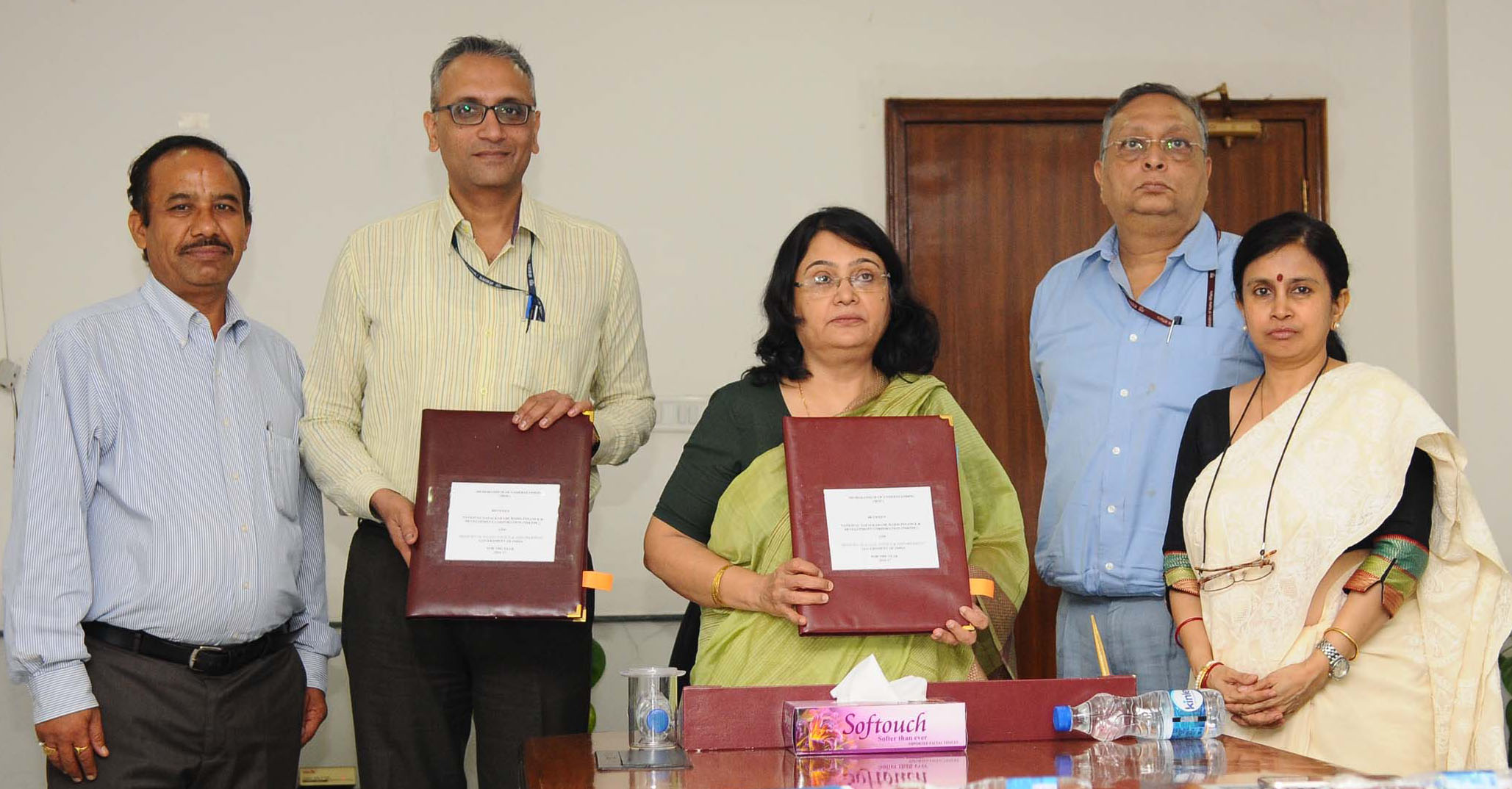
The Secretary, Ministry of Social Justice and Empowerment, Ms. Anita Agnihotri and the MD-NSKFDC

In 1991, on a sabbatical from the IAS to pursue a course on rural development in UK's Anglia Ruskin University, she wrote the novella 'Mahuldiha Days capturing the incidents that she had encountered as an administrator in Odisha's Mahuldiha.

In 2015, Anita's book Mahanadi was published. The eponymous book is written with the river Mahanadi in the first person. It tells the story of a river that flows through some of the least developed (and poorest) regions of Chhattisgarh and Odisha, and the profound influence of the river on the regions society, culture and economics.

In 2021, Niyogi Books published the English translation of Mahanadi under the imprint Thornbird.

== Awards and recognition ==
- Tapasi basu Smriti Puraskar 1429, awarded by Bangiya Sahitya Parishat (2022)
- Khonj Sahitya Puraskar 2022, awarded by Khonj Sahitya Patrika, West Bengal, India.
- Pratibha Basu Smriti Puraskar (2016, awarded by Damayanti Basu Singh)
- Sailajananda Smarak Sahitya Samman 2014, awarded by Paschimbanga Bangla Akademi
- Economist-Crossword Award, 2011 in the category 'Indian Language Fiction Translation' for Anita's collection of stories Seventeen, translated from Bengali by Arunava Sinha
- Gajendra Kumar Mitra Smriti Puraskar (2010, awarded by Mitra and Ghosh Publishers)
- Bhuban Mohini Dasi Gold Medal by the University of Calcutta for contribution to Bengali literature, awarded in 2010
- Galpamela Puraskar 2007, awarded by Galpamela, Chandannagore
- Sarat Puraskar 2004, awarded by Sarat Shatabarshiki Samiti, Bhagalpur
- Indu Basu Smriti Puraskar (1998)
- Sahitya Setu Puraskar, awarded by Sahitya Setu group, Bansberia
- Bangla Academy Somen Chanda Puraskar, awarded by Paschimbanga Bangla Akademi (Anita returned this award in protest of the killing of innocent people in Nandigram)

== Bibliography ==
=== Poetry collections ===
- Chandan Gaachh (1987)
- Brishti Asbe (1992)
- Snajowa Bahini Jay (1995)
- Nirbachita Kabita (1996)
- Braille (2002)
- Kritanjali Megh (2008)
- Kabita Samagra (2009)
- MalimHarbour (2015)
- Ayna Matrisama (2016)
- Shreshtha Kabita (2019)

=== Novels ===
- Mahuldihar Din (1996)
- Jara Bhalobesechhilo (1998, new Sopan edition 2019)
- Akalbodhan (2003)
- Alik Jiban (2006)
- Sukhabasi (2009)
- Aynay Manush Nai (2013)
- Mahanadi (2015)
- Upanyas Samagra (2018)
- Kaste (2019)
- Mahakantar (2021)
- Labanakta (2022)
- Aynay Manush Nai (2023)

=== Collections of short stories ===
- Chandan Rekha (1993)
- Pratikshan Galpa Sankalan (1997)
- Tarani (2000)
- Atal Sparsha (2006)
- Shrestha Galpa (2003, enlarged 2018)
- Panchashti Galpa (2012)
- Dashti Galpa (2009)
- Bhalobasar Galpa (2018)
- Sera Panchashti Galpa (2018)
- Panchashti Galpa (2019)
- Palasher Ayu (2022)

=== Children's and juvenile literature ===
- Akim O Porikonye (1993)
- Akim O Dwiper Manush, Akim Niruddesh, Ratan Master er Pathshala, Bandi Rajkumar (2004)
- Joyramer Sinduk (2006)
- Ebu Gogo (2009)
- Chhotoder Galpa Samagra (2012)
- Chhotoder Galpamela (2020)
- Gachhera Gelo Berate (2023)

=== Essay collections / non-fictions ===
- Kolkatar Pratima Shilpira (2001)
- Unnayan O Prantik Manush (2007)
- Desher Bhitor Desh (2013)
- Ei Andhare Ke Jage (2019)
- Rod Bataser Path (2021)
- Amar Pratibader Bhasha (2022)
- Likhte Likhte Athoi Door (2023)
- Involuntary Displacement in Dam Projects edited by A.B. Ota & Anita Agnihotri; foreword by Michael Cernea. Prachi Prakashan, 1996. ISBN 8185824037

=== Translated books ===
- Those who had known love (2000)
- Forest Interludes (2001/ Kali for Women)
- Dagar I Mahuldiha (Swedish) (2006 / Bokförlaget Tranan)
- The Awakening (2009/ Zubaan)
- Sabotage (2013)
- Seventeen (2015/ Zubaan)
- Mahuldiha Days (2018/Zubaan)
- A Day in the life of Mangal Taram ( 2020)
- The Sickle (2021)
- Mahanadi (2021/ Niyogi Books)
- Mahanadi (2023/ Setu Prakashan) (Hindi, translated by Lipika Saha)
