= Looking East to Look West =

Non-fiction book by Sunada K. Datta-Ray

Looking East to Look West: Lee Kuan Yew's Mission India
- Author: Sunanda K. Datta-Ray
- Language: English
- Publisher: Penguin; ISEAS
- Publication date: October 27, 2009
- Pages: 384
- ISBN: 978-981-4279-04-8

Looking East to Look West: Lee Kuan Yew's Mission India won India's most prestigious literary non-fiction prize, the Vodafone Crossword Book Award for 2009. Written by Sunanda K. Datta-Ray, the book is a "profound" and "intricate" analytic-history of India's first major foreign policy innovation since Non-alignment: the Look East policy. The policy began, according to Datta-Ray, during P.V. Narasimha Rao's tenure as Prime Minister of India. Rao devised the policy as only the first stage of a strategy to foster economic and security cooperation with the United States. However Looking East became an end in itself, and Singapore a valid destination, largely because of Minister Mentor Lee Kuan Yew. Today, Singapore is the route for the bulk of foreign direct investment into India and the channel for Indian companies to export to the international market. Datta-Ray details how this came about on the basis of eight one-on-one conversations with Lee, a series of interviews with supporting actors and a host of, till now, unseen documents, spanning peoples and historical records over nearly 75 years.

== Editions ==
Published for the Indian market by Penguin, there have been three reprints of the international edition which is published by the Institute of South East Asian Studies (ISEAS) in Singapore. Datta-Ray is alleged to have said at the Vodafone Crossword award ceremony that the international edition is better produced than the Indian edition (see below).

== Reception ==
Before the award, the book was well received in both India and Singapore. Recognizing that the title was understated because the book contained a novel argument which drew upon complex source material, the Indian Express said: "For once, a book delivers more than what the cover promises." Amitabh Mattoo, a leading Indian scholar, writes the book is, "a masterly chronicle". Singapore's The Straits Times carried fulsome reviews of the book.

Former Indian National Security Adviser M.K. Narayanan commended Datta-Ray for his enterprising research skills, especially seeking out and interviewing key players. The book enjoys forewords by both the Indian and Singaporean Foreign Ministers at the time of publication. Indian Foreign Minister Pranab Mukherjee writes: "India's Look East Policy ... has given us renewed confidence in India's Asian destiny. ... To bring together the multiple strands of this complex relationship, there is no better person than Sunanda K Datta-Ray."

In Singapore, President S.R. Nathan launched the book.

The book also appears to have been well received by other academic organizations. Datta-Ray was invited to speak about his book at St. Anthony's college in Oxford University and at Peterhouse college in Cambridge University.

Datta-Ray also spoke on the subject at Chatham House in London.

== Controversy ==
At the Vodafone Crossword award ceremony, Datta-Ray is alleged to have recounted the trials and tribulations of publishing the book. "He jovially jibed at his Indian publishers for having made so many mistakes," which were rectified by the Singaporean publishers of the international edition, ISEAS. Another journalist reported, "Datta-Ray took the opportunity to flay his publisher publicly: for lack of enthusiasm and competence."

Some Indian newspapers also commented on the fact that Looking East to Look West beat a book by Gurcharan Das which was also short-listed for the Vodafone Crossword non-fiction award.
