= Sarah Joseph (author) =

Indian novelist and short story writer in Malayalam

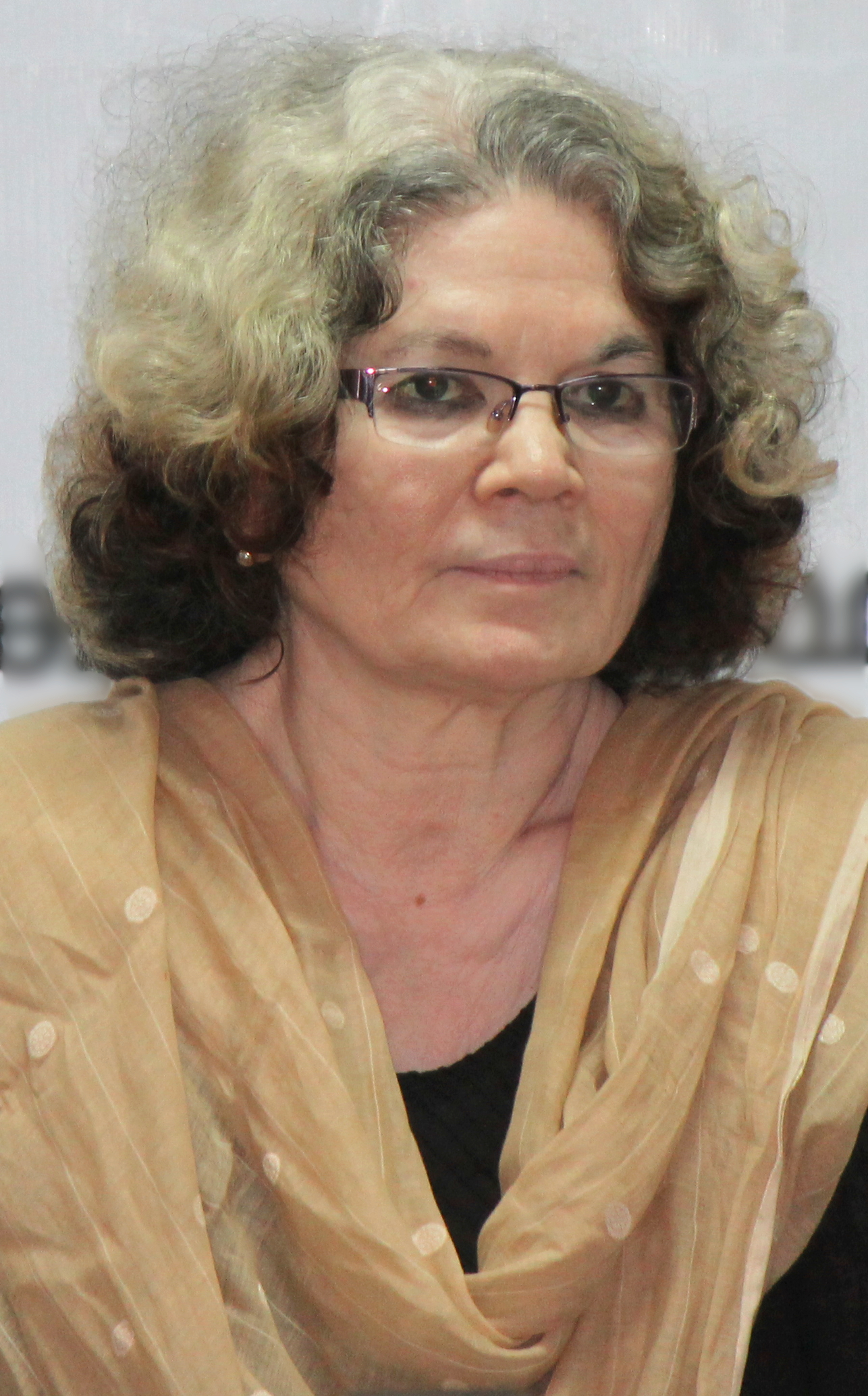
- Sarah Joseph
- Born: 1946 (age 79–80); Thrissur, Kingdom of Cochin, British India (present day Kerala, India)
- Occupation: Writer
- Writing career
- Period: Feminism
- Genres: Novel, short story, essay
- Notable works: Aalahayude Penmakkal; Puthuramayanam; Oduvilathe Suryakanthi
- Movements: Feminist literature

Sarah Joseph (born 1946) is an Indian novelist and short story writer in Malayalam. She won the Kendra Sahitya Akademi Award and the Vayalar Award for her novel Aalahayude Penmakkal (Daughters of God the Father). She is a leader of the feminist movement in Kerala and is the founder of the activist organization Manushi. She joined the Aam Aadmi Party in 2014 and contested the 2014 parliament elections from Thrissur Lok Sabha constituency.

== Biography ==
Sarah Joseph was born into a conservative Christian family at Kuriachira in Thrissur city in 1946 to Louis and Kochumariam. She was married at the age of 15 when she was in class IX. She attended the teacher's training course and began her professional career as a school teacher. Later, she received her B.A. and M.A. in Malayalam as a private candidate and joined the collegiate service in Kerala. She served as a Professor of Malayalam at Sanskrit College, Pattambi. She has since retired from government service and lives at Mulamkunnathukavu in Thrissur district. Her daughter Sangeetha Sreenivasan is also a writer.

Sarah Joseph is also a well-known social activist and feminist movement leader. In the 1980s, she founded the women's group Manushi at Sanskrit College in Pattambi, where she also taught Malayalam and literature. With her group, she led protests over several decades in response to a wide range of crimes against women, including rape, dowry deaths, trafficking, and sexual slavery.

She joined the Aam Aadmi Party in January 2014, and was fielded by the party as a candidate from the Thrissur Lok Sabha constituency in the 2014 parliament elections, but lost to C. N. Jayadevan of Communist Party of India.

== Literary career ==
Her literary career began when she was in high school. Many of her poems appeared in Malayalam weeklies. She was also good at reciting her poems at poets' meets which was much appreciated by poets like Vyloppilli Sreedhara Menon and Edasseri Govindan Nair.

She has published a trilogy of novels which includes Aalahayude Penmakkal, Mattathi, and Othappu. Othappu has been translated into English by Valson Thampu under the title Othappu: The Scent of the Other Side. Her novel Aalahayude Penmakkal won her three major awards – the Kerala Sahitya Academy Award, the Kendra Sahitya Akademi Award, and the Vayalar Award. It also received the Cherukad Award.

She is known for Ramayana Kathakal, a retelling of the Ramayana. An English translation of this work has been published by the Oxford University Press.

In 2011, she won the Muttathu Varkey Award for her collection of short stories titled Papathara. A collection of her short stories translated into English, The Masculine of ‘Virgin’ was released in 2012, including her story Papathara, from the collection that led K. Satchidanandan to create the word "Pennezhuthu," which was defined by The Hindu as "writing seen as a feminist concept, in which the author uses female constructions of identity."

She is also the recipient of the first O. V. Vijayan Sahitya Puraskaram in 2011 for her novel Ooru Kaval. In 2012 she won the Padmaprabha Literary Award.

On 10 October 2015, Joseph joined a protest by writers when she returned her 2003 Sahitya Akademi Award, stating, "There is a growing fear and lack of freedom under the present government", and criticising silence by the Sahitya Akademi in response murders of writers and mob violence.

== Selected works ==
=== Short stories ===
- Raktachandran (The Blood-Moon)
- Dukhavelli (The Good Friday)
- Manassile Thee Matram (1973)
- Kadinte Sangeetham (1975, anthology of short stories)
- Pathalappadikal (Steps to the Netherworld)
- Papathara (The Ground of Sin)
- Prakasiniyude Makkal (Prakasini’s Children)
- Dampatyam (In Marriage)
- Oduvilathe Suryakanthi
- Nilavu Nirayunnu
- Puthuramayanam
- Kaadithu Kandaayo Kaanthaa
- Nanmathinmakalude Vriksham (anthology of short stories) (The Tree of Knowledge)
- Retelling the Ramayana: Voices from Kerala, translated by Vasanthi Sankaranarayanan, OUP, 2005
- The Masculine of the Virgin, translated by J. Devika, OUP, 2013
- Malayalathinte Suvarnakathakal - Sara Joseph (A collection of 24 Selected Stories of Sara Joseph, published by Green Books)

=== Novels ===
- Thaikulam
- Aalahayude Penmakkal (The Daughters of Alaha)
- Maattaathi (The Woman-Enemy)
- Othappu
- Othappu: The Scent of the Other Side, translated by Valson Thampu, OUP, 2009
- Aathi
- Ooru Kaval
- Aalohari Anandam
- Budhini
- Ati (A Gift of Green)
