= Jatindra Kumar Nayak =

Indian writer and translator

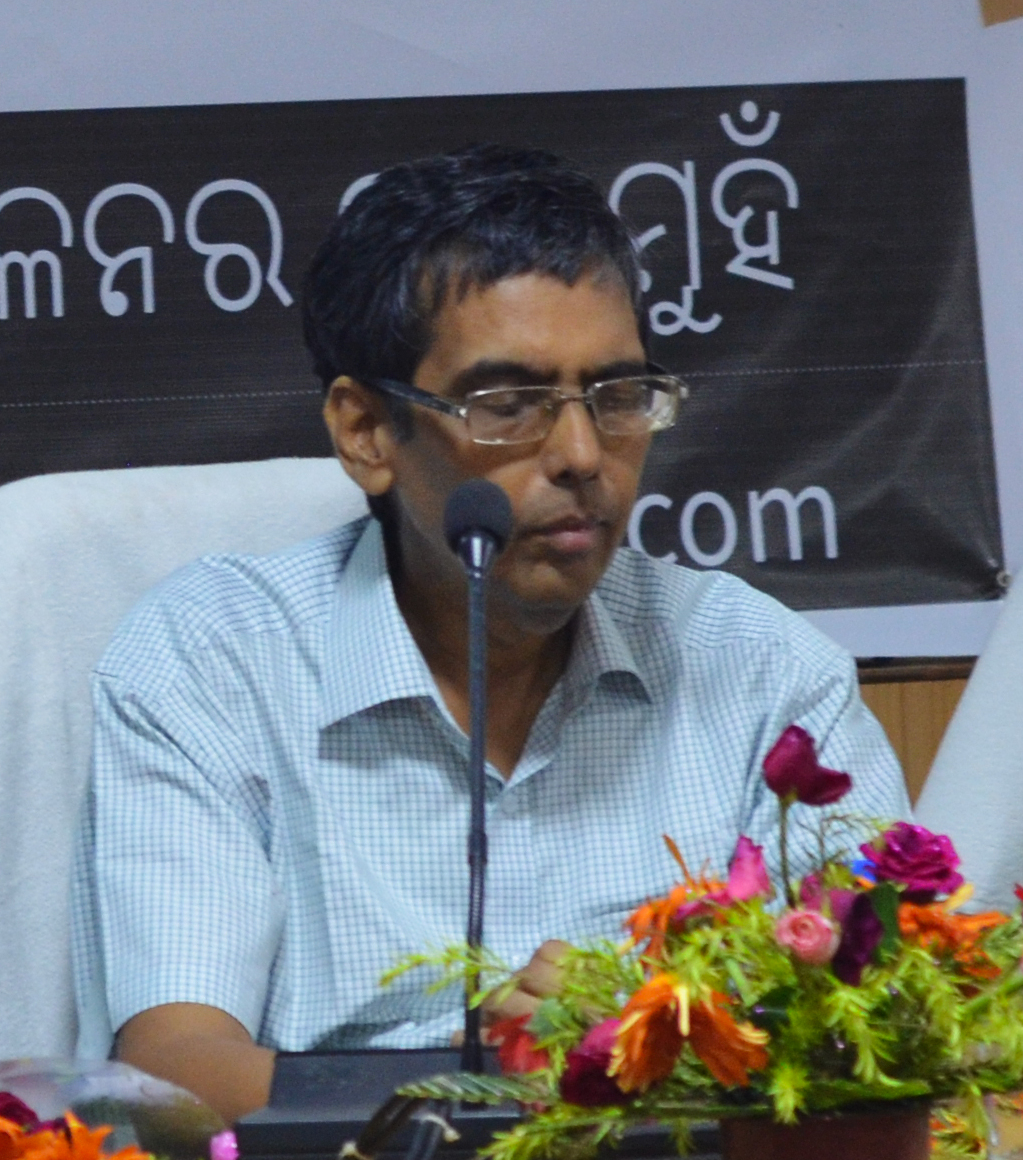
.Jatindra Kumar Nayak during Odia Wikisource's 1st anniversary, Bhubaneswar, Odisha.

Jatindra Kumar Nayak (born 18 November 1956) is an Indian translator, literary critic, columnist, editor and academic from Odisha. Nayak has translated several works of Odia literature into English, including Yantrarudha, a novel by Chandrasekhar Rath, as 'Astride the Wheel'. Astride the Wheel for which he received the 2004 Hutch Crossword Book Award for Indian Language Fiction Translation. He also won the Katha Translation Award for his English rendering of Tarun Kanti Mishra's short story as The Descent. Nayak is a co-translator of the English translation of Odia novel Chha Mana Atha Guntha by Fakir Mohan Senapati. The English translation of the book was first published in the USA under the title Six Acres and a Third. He has also translated into English the Atma Jibana Charita, the autobiography of Fakir Mohan Senapati, as Story of My Life. His other notable translations in English include the translation of Jagannath Prasad Das's Desha Kala Patra into A Time Elsewhere. Rupantar, an organisation that he founded in Bhubaneswar publishes translation of Odia books in English.

== Early life ==
Nayak studied in Ravenshaw College and University of Oxford. He teaches English literature in Utkal University.
