= Das Narayandas =

American economist

Das Narayandas is an American economist currently the Edsel Bryant Ford Professor of Business Administration at Harvard Business School.
