= Gajendrakumar Mitra =

Bengali writer from India

Gajendra Kumar Mitra
- Born: 11 November 1908; Calcutta, British India
- Died: 16 October 1994 (aged 85); Calcutta, India
- Occupations: Novelist, playwright, poet, essayist
- Spouse: Pratima Mitra
- Writing career
- Language: Bengali
- Notable works: Kolkatar Kāchhei, Pānchajanya
- Notable awards: Sahitya Academy award Rabindra Puraskar

Gajendra Kumar Mitra (Bengali: গজেন্দ্র কুমার মিত্র) (11 November 1908 – 16 October 1994) was a Bengali writer. In the year 1959, he won the Sahitya Akademi Award in Bengali for his novel, Kolkatar Kāchhei (A Stone's Throw from Kolkata).

== Life ==
Gajendra Kumar Mitra was born on 11 November 1908. He was a versatile writer, wrote many novels, short stories, plays, essays and poems. Mitra also translated a few English novels into Bengali, such as Dickens's A Tale of Two Cities. He used to write with his left hand. His genuine love and concern for Bengali literature inspired him to co-found the famous Mitra and Ghosh Publishers. Mitra was childless. He died on 16 October 1994 in Kolkata leaving behind his wife and two daughters. Mitra along with his friend Sumathanath Ghosh established Mitra & Ghosh Publishers on 9 March 1934.

== Books ==
- Kanta Prem
- Pānchajanya
- Rai Jāgo Rai Jāgo
- Kolkatar Kāchei (Translated as A Stone's Throw from Kolkata)
- Paush Phāguner Pālā
- Upakanthe
- Bahnibanyā
- Rātrir Tapashyā
- Pashaner Khuda
