= Apurva Purohit =

Indian businesswoman (born 1966)

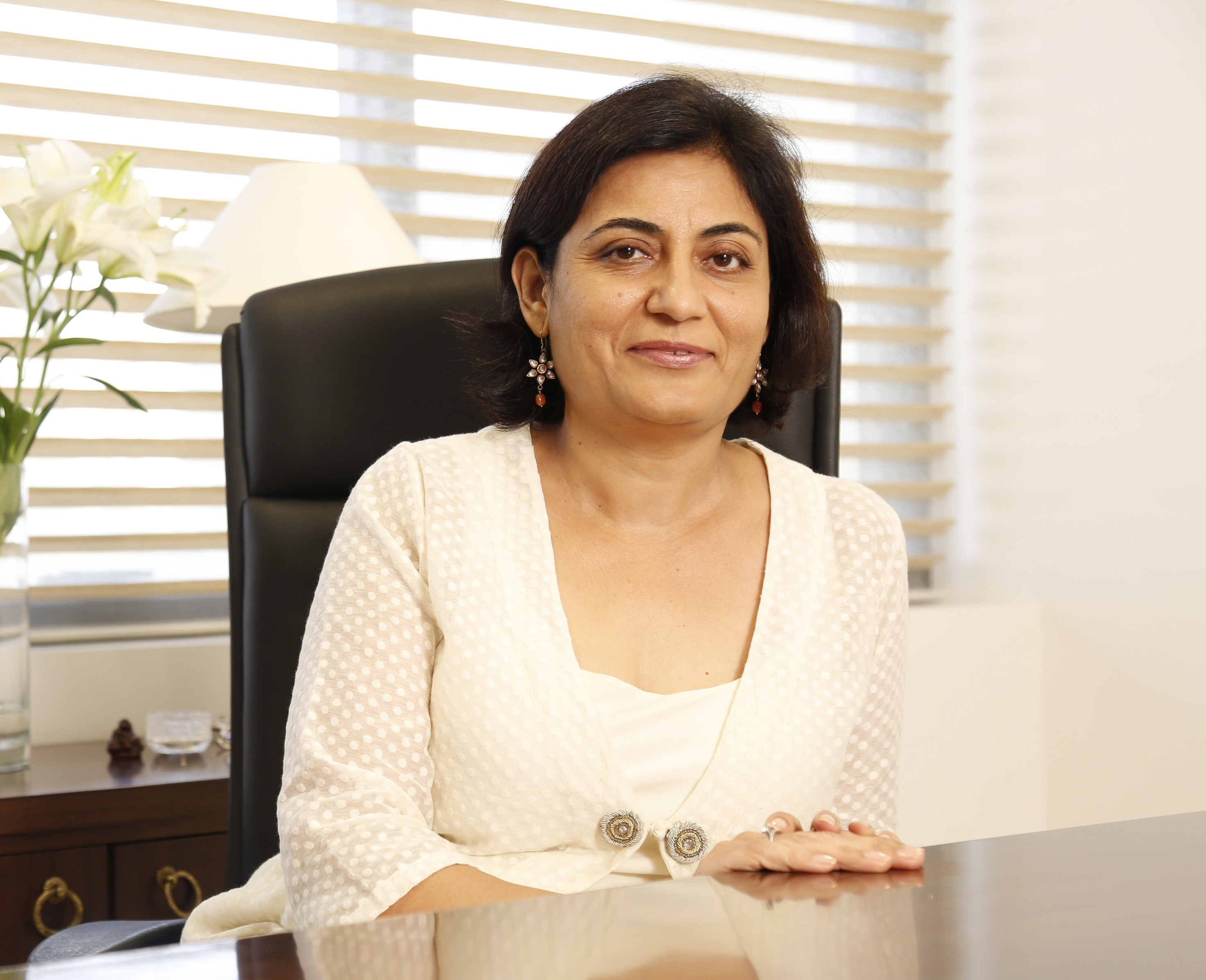
- Born: 3 October 1966 (age 60); Chandigarh, Punjab, India
- Education: Indian Institute of Management Bangalore; Stella Maris College
- Occupations: Co-founder of Aazol Ventures Private Limited, Author
- Spouse: Sanjay Purohit

Apurva Purohit (born 3 October 1966) is an Indian businesswoman and author.

Purohit launched Aazol Ventures Pvt Ltd, a consumer products company which sells traditional food items made by self-help groups and micro entrepreneurs.

She is also an independent director at LTIMindtree, L&T Technology Services, Navin Fluorine International and Marico.

Purohit is the author of the two national bestselling books on women empowerment in the workplace, Lady, You’re Not a Man and Lady, You’re the Boss!

== Biography ==
=== Early life and education ===
Purohit obtained a bachelor's degree in science (physics) from Stella Maris College, Chennai, and completed her master's degree in business administration from Indian Institute of Management Bangalore.

=== Career ===
Purohit worked across media businesses including radio, print and digital. She was the CEO of Radio City, leading its growth in the FM radio space and subsequently listing it on the stock exchanges in 2017. She also worked as the president of Jagran Group. Purohit was responsible for setting up Lodestar, a media buying agency. She oversaw Times Group's entry into television in 2004 as the chief operating officer of Times Television. She also worked with Zee TV and Mid-Day.

== Recognition ==
- She was awarded the Distinguished Alumni Award from IIM Bangalore in 2022.
- She was ranked as one of the Top 30 Most Powerful Women in Business as per Business Today in 2016, 2018 and 2019.
- She was featured in Fortune India's Most Powerful Women in Business list 2018, 2019 and 2020.

== Bibliography ==
- Lady, You're Not a Man!: The Adventures of a Woman at Work
- Lady, You're the Boss!: The Adventures of a Woman at Work – Part 2

== Personal life ==
Purohit is married to Sanjay Purohit and has a son Siddharth Purohit. She lives in Mumbai. Purohit is an avid sports follower, and represented Tamil Nadu in hockey in 1984–1987.
