= Two Lives (Seth book) =

2005 non-fiction book by Vikram Seth

- Dust jacket of UK hardback edition
- Genre: Biography
- Publisher: Little, Brown
- Publication date: September 2005
- Pages: 512 pp
- Awards: Vodafone Crossword Book Award (2006)
- ISBN: 0-316-72774-1
- OCLC: 62231085

Vikram Seth's second non-fiction work, Two Lives (published in 2005), is the story of a century and of a love affair across an ethnic divide. As the name suggests, it is a story of two extraordinary lives, that of his great-uncle, Shanti Behari Seth, and of his German Jewish great-aunt, Hennerle Gerda Caro.

Two Lives is divided into five parts, beginning with the teenage author going to live with his uncle and aunt in England for higher studies at the Tonbridge School. His first year is followed by intense travel in Europe. After completing his A-levels, Seth moves on to continue his education at Oxford and Stanford universities, all the while remaining in contact with his guardian uncle and aunt.

The story delves intricately into the ups and downs of the lives of his uncle and aunt. The text is frequently interspersed with photographs, letters, anecdotes based on Shanti’s interviews with the author, and other sources.

Two Lives won the 2006 Vodafone Crossword Book Award.
