= Ravi Subramanian =

Indian author

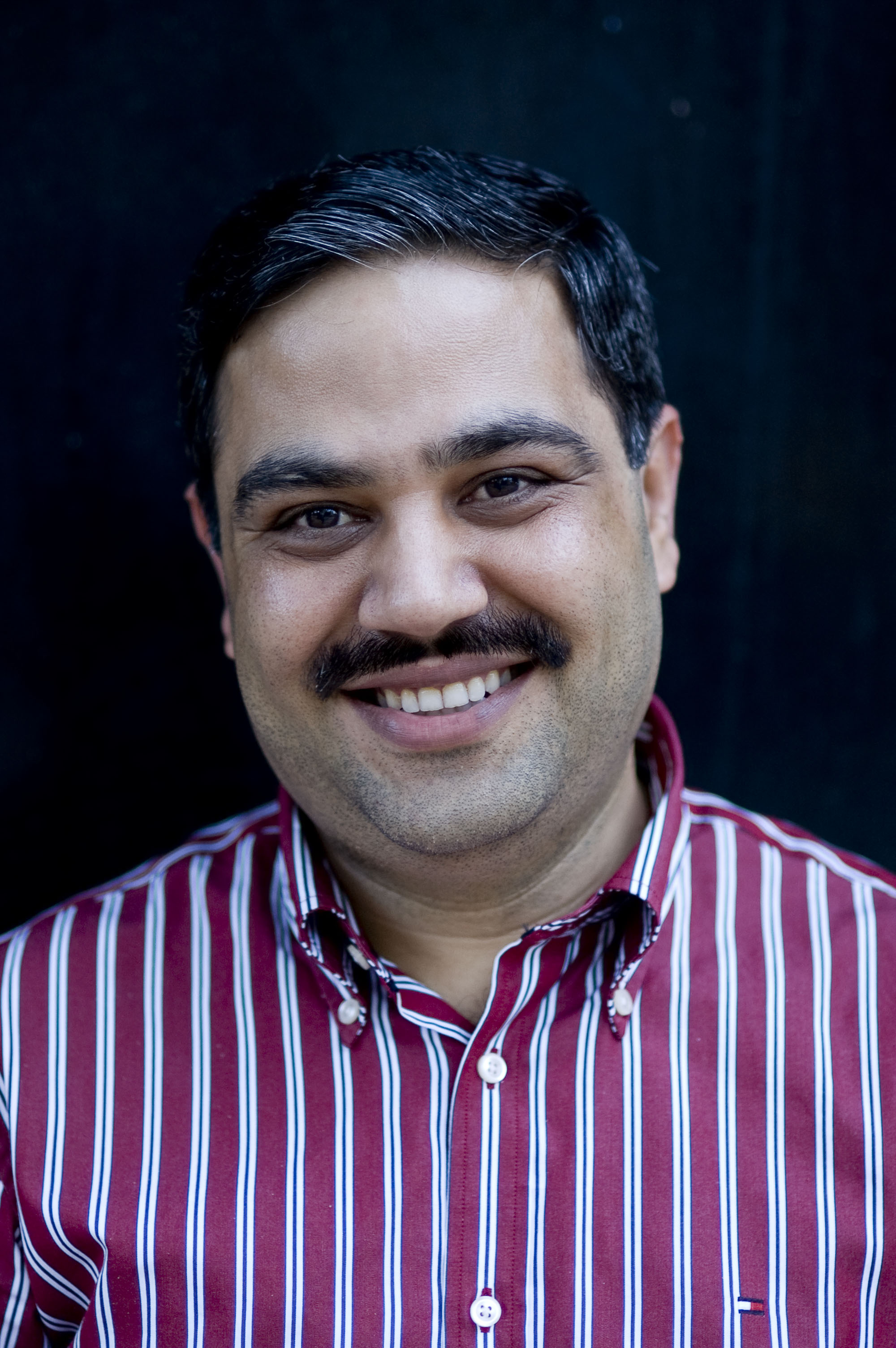
- Ravi Subramanian
- Education: IIM Bangalore
- Occupations: Banker; Author
- Writing career
- Notable works: If God Was a Banker, God is a Gamer, In the Name of God, The Bankster, Bankerupt
- Notable awards: Indiaplaza Golden Quill Book Award; Crossword Book Award
- Website: authorravis.com

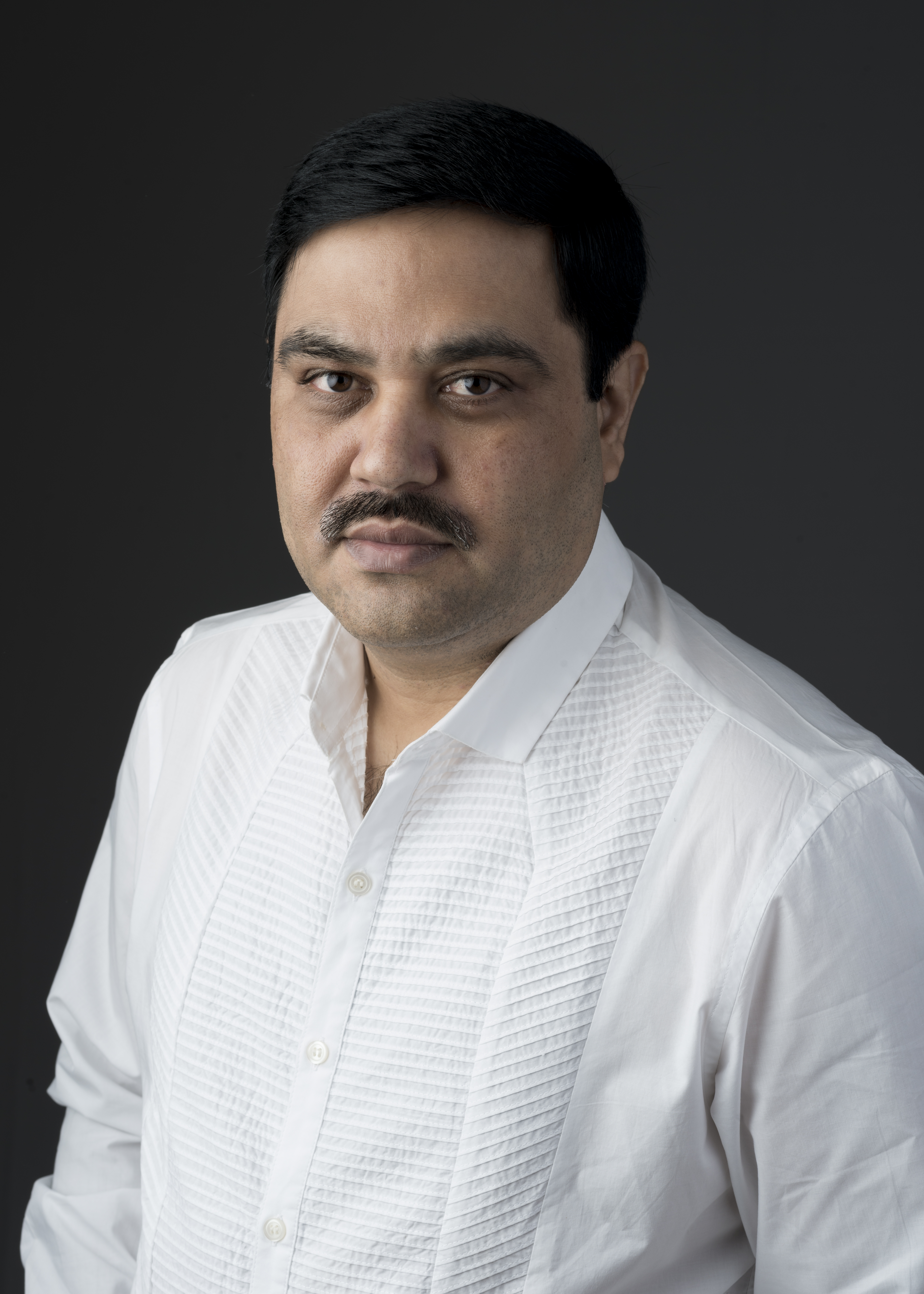
Ravi Subramanian

Ravi Subramanian is an Indian author. A banker by profession, he has written popular thrillers about banking and bankers, including award winning trilogy The Incredible Banker, The Bankster and Bankerupt. An alumnus of IIM Bangalore, batch of 1993, Subramanian spent close to two decades in the financial services industry. After having worked with companies such as Citibank, HSBC and ANZ Grindlays, he is now the CEO of a listed Non-banking financial company.

Subramanian writes popular columns for well-known magazines and has his own personal weekly column in the career and business life page of The Economic Times. He says "I will be satisfied if people remember me as the Grisham of banking," referring to the American author best known for his legal thrillers.

His daughter Anusha Subramanian has been a published author since the age of 12.

== Works ==
- If God Was a Banker (2007)
- I Bought the Monk’s Ferrari (2008)
- Devil in Pinstripes (2010)
- The Incredible Banker (2011)
- The Bankster (2012)
- Bankerupt (2013)
- God is a Gamer (2014)
- The Bestseller She Wrote (2015)
- In the Name of God (2017)
- Don't tell the Governor (2018)
- Evoked (2023)

== Awards and honors ==
- Indiaplaza Golden Quill Book Award (2008), If God Was a Banker
- Crossword Best of 2010, Devil in Pinstripes
- Crossword Book Award (2011), The Incredible Banker
- Crossword Book Award (2012), The Bankster
- Best of Leadership Writing from The Economic Times
- Crossword Book Award (2015), Bankerupt
