= Shals Mahajan =

Indian feminist writer

Shals Mahajan is a writer and queer feminist who lives in Bombay. They have been part of LABIA – Queer Feminist LBT Collective for the past two decades. Shams has worked on issues of gender, sexuality, caste and communalism as trainer, teacher and activist. They have studied literature and have conducted workshops on writing with university students, with people working in NGOs, with women returning to literacy, and queer persons.

== Writing career ==
They have also published a few children's books, Timmi in Tangles (Duckbill 2013, 2017), A Big Day for the Little Wheels (Pratham 2017) and co-authored No Outlaws in the Gender Galaxy. They have also been involved with the underground zine Scripts, a journal run by LABIA to give voice to queer Indian women, since 1998.

Timmi in Tangles is an experimental children's book that won the Kotak Junior Children writing award. It depicts the quirky and imaginative life of Timmi and the trials she faces in her everyday life.

No Outlaws in the Gender Galaxy explores the lives of people assigned the gender female at birth and retells the stories of several such individuals that faced opposition and the possibility of ostracism from society for their existence outside of the gender norm. Additionally, it questions gender - the need for it and its all encompassing influence on our lives.

Shals Mahajan also wrote 'Reva and Prisha' illustrated by Lavanya Karthik and published by Scholastic India in 2021. The book captures the heartwarming journey of an interfaith queer couple, Runu and Pritam, raising twin daughters, Reva and Prisha. The inclusive narrative unfolds within a school that embraces queer love, and the family is completed by their cat, Sikander.

== Personal life ==
Shals is genderqueer.
