= Ravi Neelakantan =

- Born: India
- Education: Delhi University; Indian Institute of Management Bangalore
- Occupations: IFS Officer; Ministry of External Affairs; Ministry of Commerce; Ministry of Finance

Neelakantan Ravi (also known as N. Ravi) is an Indian diplomat. He was an officer of the Indian Foreign Service (IFS) from 1971 to 2009, and has served in various diplomatic and administrative positions in the Ministry of External Affairs and Ministry of Finance under the Government of India. In 2009, he was appointed as an ambassador of Association of Southeast Asian Nations.

== Early life and education ==
N. Ravi obtained his Master's degree in Chemistry from Delhi University before joining IFS in 1971. He later obtained an MBA from Indian Institute of Management Bangalore in 1982. He received Gold medal for the best all round performance at IIM Bangalore.

== Career ==
While working in India at different times, his assignments have covered political, economic and trade/commerce functions, in the Ministry of External Affairs, Ministry of Commerce and Ministry of Finance. His overseas postings include Belgrade, Tokyo, Thimphu, Moscow, Munich and Hanoi. He has served as the Secretary (East) in the Ministry of External Affairs, the Indian Ambassador to Vietnam, Minister in the Indian Embassy at Bhutan, the Consul General of India (Consulate General of India in Munich), and Joint Secretary in Ministry of Foreign Affairs. He retired in December 2009 after serving as the in-charge for India's relations with ASEAN countries in the Ministry of External Affairs.

After retirement, he took up an academic position as the senior fellow in the Centre for Public Policy at Indian Institute of Management Bangalore.

== Recognition ==
Ravi was awarded the Distinguished Alumnus award by IIM Bangalore in October 2009.
