= ID Fresh Food =

Food products company

ID Fresh Foods
- Industry: Food
- Founded: 2005
- Headquarters: Bengaluru, Karnataka, India
- Key people: PC Musthafa CEO
- Products: Ready to Cook Package Foods
- Revenue: ▲₹870 crore (US$90 million)(FY26)
- Website: www.idfreshfood.com

ID Fresh foods is a food products company based in Bangalore, India. The company manufactures a range of fresh foods including Idly/Dosa Batter, Parotas, chapatis, curd, and paneer.

ID Fresh Food, a private limited company, was founded in 2005 by P.C Mustafa and his four cousins - Shamsudeen TK, Abdul Nazer, Jafar TK and Noushad TD.

== History ==
The company was established with the capital of ₹50,000 by Mustafa. Mustafa holds 50 percent share in the company, and his four cousins hold the rest. The company has supplied ten packets of one-kilogram batter to 20 stores in Bengaluru under the brand name ‘ID’(Idly, Dosa) – operating from a 550 square feet space with two grinders, a mixer, and a sealing machine.

The company made a profit from day one. Soon, Mustafa invested ₹6 lakh more to add more machines. At the same time, They also moved to a bigger space of 800 sq ft.

As the demand for their product increased, Mustafa invested another ₹40 lakh in 2008 and bought a 2,500 square feet shed in the Hoskote Industrial Area at Bangalore. In 2009, he sold his property in Kerala that he had purchased while working in Dubai and pumped in an additional ₹30 lakh into the business.

In two years, the company was making 2000 kg of batter daily. And also, the number of stores partnered with them was increased to 300.

In 2014, ID Fresh foods raised ₹35 crore in the first round of funding from Helion Venture Partners. In 2016, ID Fresh foods manufacture around 50,000 kg of batter daily from their units across the country and one in Dubai, which converts into a million idlis.

== Growth and profitability ==
The company has achieved a turnover of 100 crore in 2015–16. ID Fresh Foods expects to end this fiscal with Rs 286 crore turnover from ₹182 Crore in 2017–18. The company expects the turnover as ₹350-400 crore in 2019–20. The company expects to touch ₹500 crore at the end of 2021 fiscal year as per PC Mustafa, the CEO of ID fresh told to The Hindu interview.

== Business ==
ID Fresh Foods is making the range of products like Idli/Dosa Batter, Ragi Idli/Dosa Batter, Rice Rava Idli/Batter, Vada Batter, Malabar Parota, Whole Wheat & Oats Dosa, Natural Paneer & Curd.

- Idli/Dosa Batter: ID Fresh Foods is one of the major leaders of ready to cook package foods in 2018 with a primarily South Indian taste. By 2018, 46% of the ID Fresh food's business came from the idli/dosa batter.
- Malabar Parotas: By 2018, 32% of the ID Fresh food's business came from the parota's.
- Chapati: By 2018, 14% of the ID Fresh food's business came from the chapati's.

== Awards ==
The Founder of the ID Fresh Foods, P.C. Mustafa, is listed by Forbes India as "Tycoons of Tomorrow".

He was also the youngest recipient of the Distinguished Alumni Awards in the history of IIM Bangalore.
