= Payal Kapadia (author) =

Indian author

- Born: 1975 (age 50–51); Mumbai, India
- Education: Medill School of Journalism, St. Xavier's College, Mumbai
- Occupations: Writer, journalist
- Writing career
- Genre: Children's literature
- Notable awards: 2013 Crossword Book Award (Children's Literature)
- Website: www.payalkapadia.com

Payal Kapadia (born 1975) is an Indian author of Children's books. She is the recipient of the 2013 Crossword Book Award (Children's Literature) for Wisha Wozzariter.

== Biography ==
Payal Kapadia was born in 1975 in Mumbai, India. She studied English literature at St. Xavier's College, Mumbai and received a M.S. in Journalism from Northwestern University in Chicago. She has worked as a journalist with Outlook in Bombay and as an Editor with The Japan Times in Tokyo.

== Awards ==
- 2013 Crossword Book Award (Children's Literature) for Wisha Wozzariter

== Publications ==
=== Young Readers ===
- Horrid High, Penguin India (2014), ISBN 978-0143333173
- Puffin Lives: B. R. Ambedkar, Saviour of the Masses, Penguin India (2014), ISBN 978-0143332282
- Wisha Wozzariter, Penguin India (2012), ISBN 978-0143332114
- Untold Tales from The Jungle Book: Col Hathi Loses his Brigade, The Walt Disney Company (2010), ISBN 978-9380594408
