= Dreamers: How Young Indians Are Changing the World =

2018 book by Snigdha Poonam

- Author: Snigdha Poonam
- Language: English
- Subject: Social sciences
- Publisher: Harvard University Press, Hurst
- Publication date: 13 August 2018
- Publication place: India
- Pages: 264
- ISBN: 978-0674988170

Dreamers: How Young Indians Are Changing the World is a 2018 nonfiction book by Indian journalist Snigdha Poonam, a writer for the Hindustan Times. In the book, Poonam examines the lives of young people in India, and the challenges facing millennials in the nation's rural villages.

== Background ==
The book originated from Poonam's writings about the lives of young people in rural India as part of her work for the Hindustan Times. According to the author, the idea behind this book was initially to "go to a small town and pick 4–5 young people and talk to them about what they want". She began in her hometown of Ranchi and expanded to other nearby towns, spending four years researching the book.

== Synopsis ==
The book is divided into three parts, each of which profiles three or four young adults in rural India, specifically in north and central India. Through their stories, Poonam highlights the practical problems facing young Indians today—including the fact that only 2.3% of the Indian workforce has formal skills training.

The work opens with a passage about the editors of the website WittyFeed, based in the city of Indore. The Economist noted that throughout all the stories, Poonam "repeatedly finds the same mix of aspiration and anger".

== Reception ==
The book received mostly positive reviews. The Financial Times described it as "wise, timely and, alas, deeply troubling". The Economist praised Poonam's writing, but highlighted the lack of statistical figures, writing, "But what 'Dreamers' lacks in citations of official data it makes up for through its Hindi-speaking author's ability to draw out her subjects' inner thoughts. The picture she paints is impressionistic".
