= Wisden Group =

Group of companies formed by John Wisden & Co Ltd

The Wisden Group was a group of companies formed by John Wisden & Co Ltd, publishers of Wisden Cricketers' Almanack. As well as John Wisden & Co, the group included the magazine The Wisden Cricketer, Cricinfo – the world's highest traffic cricket website – and the Hawk-Eye computerised ball-tracking system, which is used by the media in cricket, tennis and other sports. The group also owned The Oldie, a general interest British magazine aimed at older readers.

Sir John Paul Getty was chairman of John Wisden & Co from 1993 until his death in 2003, when he was succeeded as majority shareholder by his son Mark.

The group was broken up in 2007 when The Wisden Cricketer was sold to British Sky Broadcasting, The Oldie was sold to a group of investors led by the magazine's former business manager, James Pembroke, and Cricinfo was sold to ESPN. John Wisden & Co was sold to A & C Black in 2008. Hawk-Eye remained under the control of Mark Getty, but was eventually sold to Sony Corporation in 2011.
