= Malayarayan =

Member of a tribal community in Kerala, South India

Mala Arayan orMalaiyarayan, is a member of a tribal community in parts of Kottayam, Idukki and Pattanamtitta districts of Kerala state, southern India.

== Social status ==
They are listed (Central List No - 20) as part of Scheduled Tribes by the Government of India. Among the Scheduled Tribes, the Malarayans outclass all the other tribes in socio-economical and educational aspects. When an evaluation in the educational and employment prospect is taken, it is found that almost all the government employees and other dinginitaries are from this faction of Scheduled Tribes.

== Thirunizhalmala and Aranmula ==
The Malayaraya community inhabiting the upper reaches of Western ghats at present, have many Vanjippattu songs included in their literature which are used in their artforms such as Kolakali and Ivarkali. The presence of such songs which are exclusively used in the Aranmula tradition could be because Malayarayars were once the non-Brahmanical, vama/Kaulachara "karmis" of Aranmula Appan or mahavishnu as attested by "Thirunizhalmala," one of the oldest poems in Malayalam language and its creator Ayiroor Govindan.

A large number of Malayarayas have converted to Christianity. Since ancient times, this tribe is said to have a proper civilization and culture. Unlike other tribes in the region, they lived in houses built from bamboo, wood and mud. The community today is fairly educated and literate.

They are said to have taught the sorcerer priest of Kerala, Kadamattathu Kathanar, before he escaped from them in the early 5th century. During the escape, they are said to have followed him into the Kadamattam church, and lashed on the church door.

Malayarayars praise "Thiruvaranmula Appan" and "Ayiroor Bhagavati" in their traditional songs. They are believed to have left the plains for mountains after their defeat at Chotty sometime between AD 1407 and 1419. Malayaraya/ Malaya country known as "Maleam" in certain 17th century European maps of Malabar lying east of Chotti was transferred to Poonjar by the victoriousThekkumkur rajas.

The last few lines of "Bana Yudham,"one of the traditional songs of malayarayans, reveals the antiquity of Aranmula Vanjippattu tradition.

വഞ്ചിരാമൻ (രാമവർമ്മ കുലശേഖരപ്പെരുമാൾ ?) മന്ത്രിമാരിൽ (നാല് തളി ?)

മുൻപനാകും മഹാവീരൻ

പഞ്ചബാണാംബുജവീരൻ അംബുജനേത്രൻ

നെഞ്ചിലേറ്റം മോദമോടെ വഞ്ചിതന്നിൽ പാടുവാൻ

ചഞ്ചലം കൂടാതെ നല്ല വഞ്ചിയുണ്ടാക്കി'

[Vanchiraman (Ramavarma Kulasekha Perumal?) Among the ministers (four plates?)

Mahavira will be the first

Panchabanamambujaveera Ambujanetran

To sing with a heart-pounding melody in the Vanchitann

He made a good boat without any hesitation']

Malayarayas have no historical memory about their presence in Ayiroor, the relationship with Aranmula temple or "Vanjippattu". These facts have came into light through some studies concluded quite recently.
