= Othappu =

Book by Sarah Joseph

- Cover page for the latest edition by Current books.
- Author: Sarah Joseph
- Original title: ഒതപ്പ്
- Language: Malayalam
- Publisher: Current Books
- Publication date: 2005
- Publication place: India
- Pages: 230
- ISBN: 978-8122606850
- Preceded by: Mattathi (Malayalam: മാറ്റാത്തി)
- Followed by: Aathi (Malayalam: ആതി)

Othappu (English: Scandal or Temptation) is a Malayalam novel written by Sarah Joseph and published in 2005. The novel is the last in the trilogy which includes 'Alaahayude Penmakkal' and 'Mattathi'. While 'Mattathi' is a kind of sequel to 'Alaahayude Penmakkal', 'Othappu' follows the pattern by having a central female character and protagonist. The novel deals with the decision of a nun to step outside the convent and embrace a life free from the shackles of established religious norms and practices. In this, the character 'Marghalitha', comes in logger heads with the church and society which refuse to accept her personal views and individual freedom and expect her to conform to the framework in place regarding those joining the nunnery. The English translation of the book named 'Othappu: The Scent of the Other Side' won the Crossword Book Award for translation.

== Plot ==
The novel opens with Marghalitha coming to her home after defrocking herself, as per her own wishes. Her family is shocked and lock her up in a store-room outside the house used for keeping raw bananas for ripening. For three days she is kept locked up without food or water. Eventually she leaves her home when she realizes that no matter what, her mother or brothers would not accept her back into the family. She wanders around and even makes a train journey to Angamali, where she spends the night in a hospital as she feels it would be the safest place for her. She is then brought by Fr. Roy Francis Kareekkan to stay with John Kasheesha, who is a friend. Fr. Kareekkan is the second important character. He is disillusioned about his role within the church and also is strongly attracted to Marghalitha. Marghalitha stays with John Kasheesha and his family, until the scandal comes to be known among his family members, which forces Marghalitha to leave so as to avoid conflict within Kasheesha's family. She is taken care for a while by her cousin Rebecca and later makes her way to the jungle retreat of Augustine, a Christian freethinker and social reformer. Here Fr. Kareekkan expresses his desire to leave the priesthood to be with her.

Kareekkan attempts to live with Marghalitha and brings her to his parents. His parents are shocked and his father commits suicide by hanging himself. This breaks Kareekkan who is both psychologically, emotionally and ideologically weak. When he discovers that Marghalitha is pregnant with his child, he abandons her and goes to live in a church as a sweeper in a distant place where no one would recognize him. Meanwhile, Augustine gives Marghalitha an orphan boy to care for, named 'Naanu'. Marghalitha, Naanu and her unborn child are left to fend for themselves. However, Marghalitha gains a new confidence and radiance and starts to realize she is a pilgrim on a revolutionary road, where she has to fight the existing norms and social structure. She refuses the wealth willed to her by her mother and boldly sets out to fulfill her individual destiny, along with Naanu and her unborn child and free from the constraints of the church, but also her family and social conventions.

The novel also has several biblical allegorical references like three nuns bringing gifts for her unborn child, referring to the Magi bringing gifts to Christ. Rebecca also enacts the role of Mary when she visits Marghalitha, discerning that she is pregnant. Several Bible verses are also used by the characters to state or express themselves from time to time.

Joseph is making a commentary on the Church rather than explaining the thought processes of her character. She does succeed in unravelling those processes, but shies away from trying to analyse or explain the hows and whys thereof. The main theme is that institutionalised church does not satisfy in the end. The Church, which is powerful and rich, does not reflect the tranquility of Jesus. It is in John Kasheesha's home and Augustine's eccentric forest mission where the reader finds that, rather than an institution, it is the individual who can truly follow Christ and try to establish the Kingdom of Heaven on earth. And yet the author leaves the whole issue open-ended. Neither Margalitha nor Karikkan finds a convincing solution to the problem from which they seek to run away.

== Main characters ==
- Marghalitha - A nun who leaves the convent because she can no longer pretend that the rituals associated with belief are meaningful to her.
- Roy Francis Kareekkan - A priest who also questions the church's double standards in serving the poor and the rich and influential. He leaves the priesthood when he realizes his desire for Marghalitha, but later abandons her.
- Augustine - a Christian freethinker and social reformer.
- John and Sarakochamma (The Kasheeshas) - The Syrian Christian couple who take care of Margharitha after she leaves the convent.
- Rebecca - Marghalitha's cousin who is a kind of vagabond preacher and healer.
