= Wisden Asia Cricket =

- Cover of the final edition
- Categories: Cricket
- Frequency: Monthly
- Format: Print
- Publisher: Wisden
- Founder: Wisden
- Founded: 2001
- First issue: December 2001
- Final issue Number: July 2005; July 2005
- Company: Wisden
- Country: India
- Based in: Mumbai, India
- Language: English
- Website: usa.cricinfo.com/wisden/wisden-asia.html

Wisden Asia Cricket was a monthly English-language cricket magazine produced by the British-based cricket publishing company Wisden.

== History and profile ==
Wisden Asia Cricket was founded in 2001. The first issue was published in December 2001. The magazine was based in Mumbai, India. It was a sister publication to the British-focused The Wisden Cricketer. Some articles appeared in both publications. In 2002 the Gulf edition of Wisden Asia Cricket was launched.

Wisden Asia Cricket ceased publication after its July 2005 edition. However, in December 2005, the Wisden Group announced the launch of a new magazine called Cricinfo Magazine, which was first published in January 2006. Although it has no geographical designation in its name, it is aimed primarily at Indian cricket enthusiasts both in India and abroad. The initial editorial team was inherited from Wisden Cricket Asia.
