= The Wisden Cricketer =

Monthly UK cricket magazine from 2003

- Editor: John Stern
- Categories: Cricket
- Frequency: Monthly
- Format: Print and digital
- Publisher: Wisden (2003–2007); BSkyB Publications Ltd / Sky (2007–2010); TestMatchExtra.com Ltd (2010–2011)
- Founder: Formed by merger of The Cricketer and Wisden Cricket Monthly
- Founded: 2003
- First issue: September 2003; 23 years ago
- Final issue: May 2011 (renamed The Cricketer)
- Company: Wisden Cricketer Publishing Ltd
- Country: United Kingdom
- Based in: London, England
- Language: English
- Website: wisdencricketer.com thecricketer.com
- ISSN: 1740-9519
- OCLC: 53269386

The Wisden Cricketer was a monthly cricket magazine. It was incorporated in 2003, by a merger between The Cricketer magazine and Wisden Cricket Monthly. It is now no longer connected to Wisden and is called The Cricketer.

The magazine covers English professional cricket in depth and also carries reports on all Test Matches and one-day international cricket played around the world, together with a small amount of coverage of domestic cricket outside the United Kingdom. In addition, it covers amateur cricket in the United Kingdom.

It was first published by the specialist cricket publisher Wisden in England, until being acquired by Sky in April 2007. It was then sold to its current owners, TestMatchExtra.com Ltd, in December 2010.

== Details ==
Available globally both at newsagents and via subscription, TWC had an audited sales figure of 34,559, 95 per cent of it from the UK. In 2008, it launched its website, aiming "to showcase the content of The Wisden Cricketer while exploring the greater flexibility that the web offers."

The Wisden Cricketer formerly had a sister publication called Wisden Asia Cricket. It folded in July 2005, but in December 2005 a new publication from the same company called Cricinfo Magazine was announced, though that was closed down shortly after ESPN's acquisition of Cricinfo. The Wisden Cricketer: South African edition recently closed down, too.

Following the sale of the magazine to Test Match Extra, the magazine merged with the much older The Cricketer magazine and changed its name to The Cricketer (in association with Wisden) in May 2011. The editor of The Wisden Cricketer for all its existence, John Stern, left later that month.
