= 1862 Fairytale Maskenfest =

The 1862 Fairytale Maskenfest was a German masquerade ball held on 15 February 1862 at the Royal Odeon in Munich

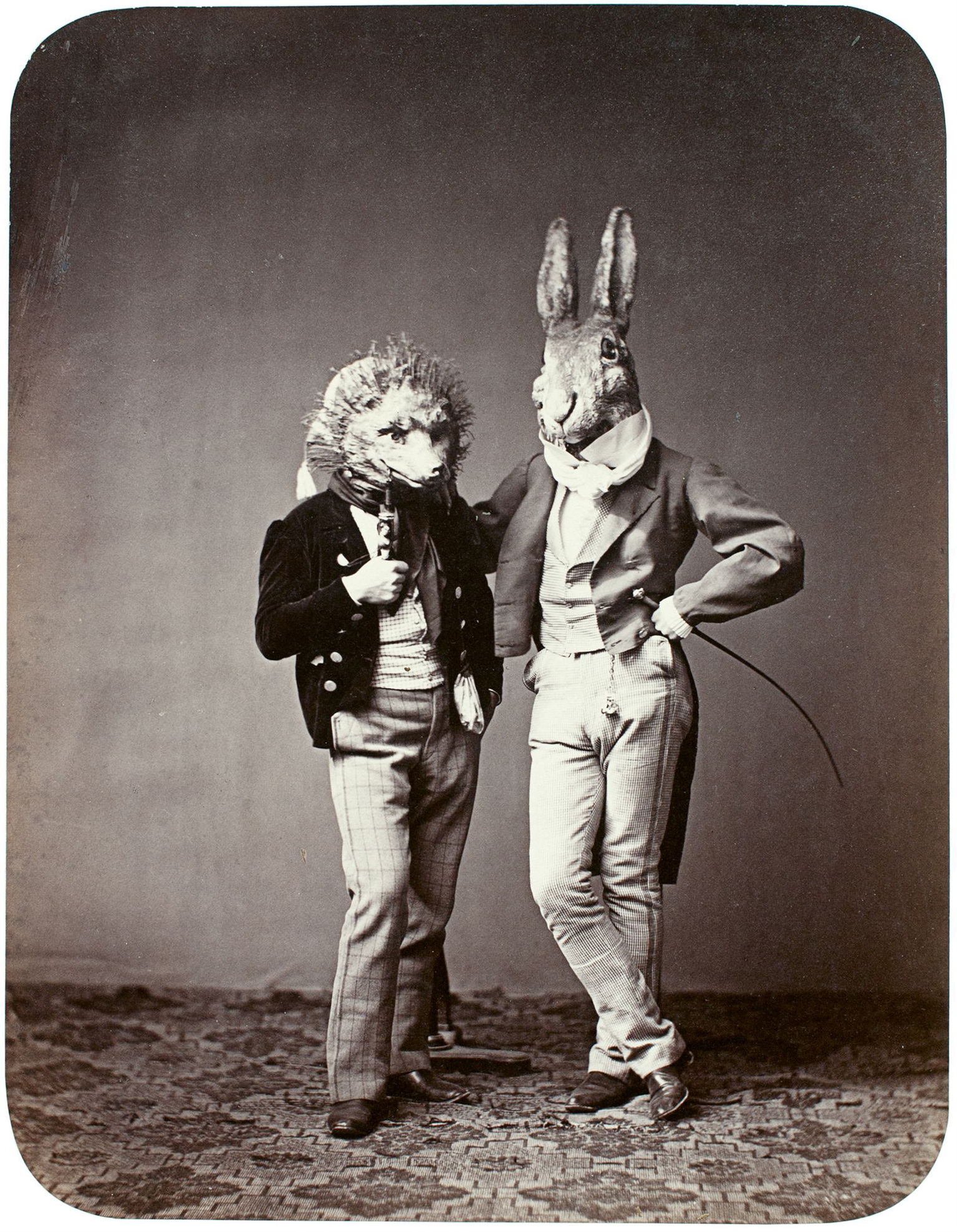
Attendees of the fairytale ball: an unknown artist (left) and the sculptor Hermann Oehlmann (right), depicting the race between the hedgehog and the hare.

Organized by the artist's association "Jung-München" ("Young Munich") and spearheaded by Wilhelm Busch, the ball presented as an elaborate celebration of fairytales and folklore during the height of German Carnival season Advertised as a "German Fairy Tale World," the event featured extensive staging, costuming, and performances during a time when fairytales were experiencing a surge of popularity in Germany.

Photographs by court photographer Joseph Albert document attendees dressed in animal and fairy‑tale costumes, including medieval figures, mermaids, hare‑and‑hedgehog pairs, and Puss in Boots.

Not only was the event attended by much of Munich's art world, but it also attracted the Bavarian court, including the 16-year-old heir to the Bavarian throne King Ludwig II, later famed as the "Märchenkönig" (or the "Fairytale King").

== Background ==
The artist's association Jung-München (meaning "Young Munich") or "Die Jungmünchner" (meaning the Young Munich Artists), was an informal circle of painters, sculptors, writers, and composers. Notable young artists such as the humorist Wilhelm Busch, painter Moritz von Schwind, and composer Georg Kremplsetzer were among the association’s members.

Active in Munich from 1853 to 1864, this club was less about a strict artistic program and more about camaraderie and festive gatherings. These events were often held during carnival season (also known as "Fasching" or "Künstlerfeste"), reaching its height in the week before Ash Wednesday. Events consisted of costumed parties and parades.

Trending fairytales and folklore included those collected by the Brothers Grimm and Ludwig Bechstein.

== Event ==
Admission for the event was by entry ticket. Lithographed tickets (designed by Jung-München artist Andreas Müller) featured "dancing maidens and two music-making gnomes." An original 21-page souvenir booklet for the 1862 Maskenfest survives in the Bavarian State Library.

Artist and association member Wilhelm Busch was responsible for the program. Busch stipulated that the entire staging (decorations, costumes, props, and skits) should be based on the fairy‑tale illustrations of Moritz von Schwind and Ludwig Richter. According to the International League of Antiquarian Booksellers, however, the costumes worn by attendees bore little resemblance.

Composer Georg Kremplsetzer, another member of the artists' association, composed and performed the Singspiel "Hansel and Gretel" for the public (including the royal court) during the fairytale masquerade to a successful reception. Busch as also credited as a writer of this operetta.

Photographer Joseph Albert was also in attendance and photographed various costumed guests depicting costumed groups like Aschenbrödel’s entourage, the Hedgehog and Hare, Puss in Boots. Albert's photographs are currently preserved and displayed by the Munich City Museum.

Young architectural painter and stage designer Christian Jank was enlisted and oversaw stage and set decorations for the ball. "In a months-long competition with his friends" and alongside other fellow artists, he painted an enormous backdrop and "transformed the Odeon into a fairy-tale landscape" and staged scenery. On a canvas 800 meters wide and 50 meters high, Jank painted a Romanesque panoramic backdrop featuring a medieval-styled "Märchenschloss" (or fairy-tale castle) perched on rocky outcrop (with towers, battlements, oriels, and drawbridges) and the Rhine in the distance.
