= The Eagle and the Beetle =

Aesop's fable

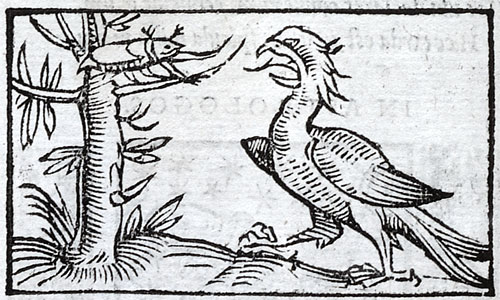
The emblem of the eagle and the beetle, from Andrea Alciato's Emblematum Liber (1534)

The story of the feud between the eagle and the beetle is one of Aesop's Fables and often referred to in Classical times. It is numbered 3 in the Perry Index and the episode became proverbial. Although different in detail, it can be compared to the fable of The Eagle and the Fox. In both cases the eagle believes itself safe from retribution for an act of violence and is punished by the destruction of its young.

== The fable and its variations ==
A hare that is fleeing from an eagle begs a beetle for shelter. The beetle pleads that the right of asylum is guaranteed by Zeus but the eagle, being the bird of Zeus, arrogantly disregards this and tears the hare to pieces. In revenge, the beetle climbs to the eagle's nest and rolls out its eggs, following it up the higher it builds. Finally the eagle lays its eggs in the lap of Zeus but the beetle flies about the god's head, or in some versions rolls a ball of dung onto him, causing the god to leap up and let the eggs fall to the ground. There are alternative accounts in which the episode of the hare does not appear at all and the feud is related as being of long standing and consisting of raids on each other's nesting places. The story was told by William Caxton of a weasel and an eagle while Gilles Corrozet tells the story of an ant and an eagle in his emblem book.

In ancient times the story became the basis for an ironical Greek proverb, 'the dung beetle serving as midwife to the eagle' (ὁ κάνθαρος αετòν μαιεύεται), taken from a line of Aristophanes Lysistrata. This was recorded by Erasmus in his Adagia (1507), along with a Latin alternative, Scarabaeus aquilam quaerit (a dung beetle hunting an eagle), used of a weaker person taking on a powerful adversary. Where Erasmus told the story at length, Andrea Alciato devoted a short Latin poem to yet another variation in his Emblematum Liber (1534) under the title A mimumus timiendum (Even the least are to be feared). There he explained that "though inferior in physical strength, it is superior in strategy. It hides itself secretly in the eagle's feathers without being felt, in order to attack its enemy's nest across the lofty skies. It bores into the eggs and prevents the hoped-for offspring from developing."

Hieronymus Osius also dealt with the subject in Latin verse, drawing the same moral, and also told the story at greater length in his Phryx Aesopus (1564). In both cases the story is told of a dung-beetle (scarabaeus), as it was by La Fontaine in his Fables (L'Escarbot et l'aigle, II.8). In this the beetle is brought to trial by Zeus and convinces the god that it is in fact avenging the crime of lèse majesté. All Zeus can do is change the breeding time of the eagle to one when the beetle is hibernating.

After the time of Caxton, the story rarely reappeared in English. Robert Dodsley told it at some length in his collection of Select Fables of Esop (1761), but accompanied it with scathing comments regarding its truth to life. Vikram Seth's retelling in his Beastly Tales (1991) is equally discursive as it lifts the fable to verse performance.
