= A Suitable Girl =

A Suitable Girl may refer to:

- A Suitable Girl (novel), an upcoming novel by Vikram Seth
- A Suitable Girl (film), a 2017 documentary film
- A Suitable Girl, a 2017 album by Ali Barter
