= Many a Slip =

Many a Slip may refer to:

- Many a Slip (radio series), a BBC Radio 4 panel game
- Many a Slip (film), a 1931 American comedy film

== See also ==
- There's many a slip 'twixt the cup and the lip, an English proverb
