= Who Could Win a Rabbit =

Single by Animal Collective

from the album Sung Tongs
- Released: July 19, 2004
- Recorded: September, 2003
- Genre: Experimental pop, freak folk, psychedelic folk
- Length: 2:18
- Label: FatCat
- Songwriter: Animal Collective
- Producer: Animal Collective

Animal Collective singles chronology
"Wastered" (2004)	"Who Could Win a Rabbit" (2004)	"Grass" (2005)

"Who Could Win a Rabbit" is the first single from experimental pop band Animal Collective's fifth album, Sung Tongs.

Similar to the remainder of Sung Tongs, the song features a prominent usage of acoustic guitar. The song has a quick structure and, with regard to lyricism, is rather oblique and seemingly nonsensical. It also possesses an unusual time signature. Based in 3/4, which has been used repeatedly by the band, it has two sporadic bars in 4/4 and a bridge in 5/4.

It was ranked by Pitchfork Media to be the 14th best single of 2000-2004. The song "Baby Day" is included on the single as a b-side.

== Music video ==
The music video for Who Could Win A Rabbit was directed by Danny Perez, who subsequently directed the Animal Collective visual album ODDSAC. The video features Avey Tare and Panda Bear as a rabbit and turtle respectively, racing each other in the same vein as Aesop's fable, The Tortoise and the Hare, while Geologist and Deakin are spectators of the race. The video ends with Panda Bear killing Tare and eating his bloody remains.

== Track listing ==
No.	Title	Length
1.	"Who Could Win a Rabbit"	2:18
2.	"Baby Day"	4:32
Total length:		6:50
