= The Tortoise and the Hare =

Fable by Aesop

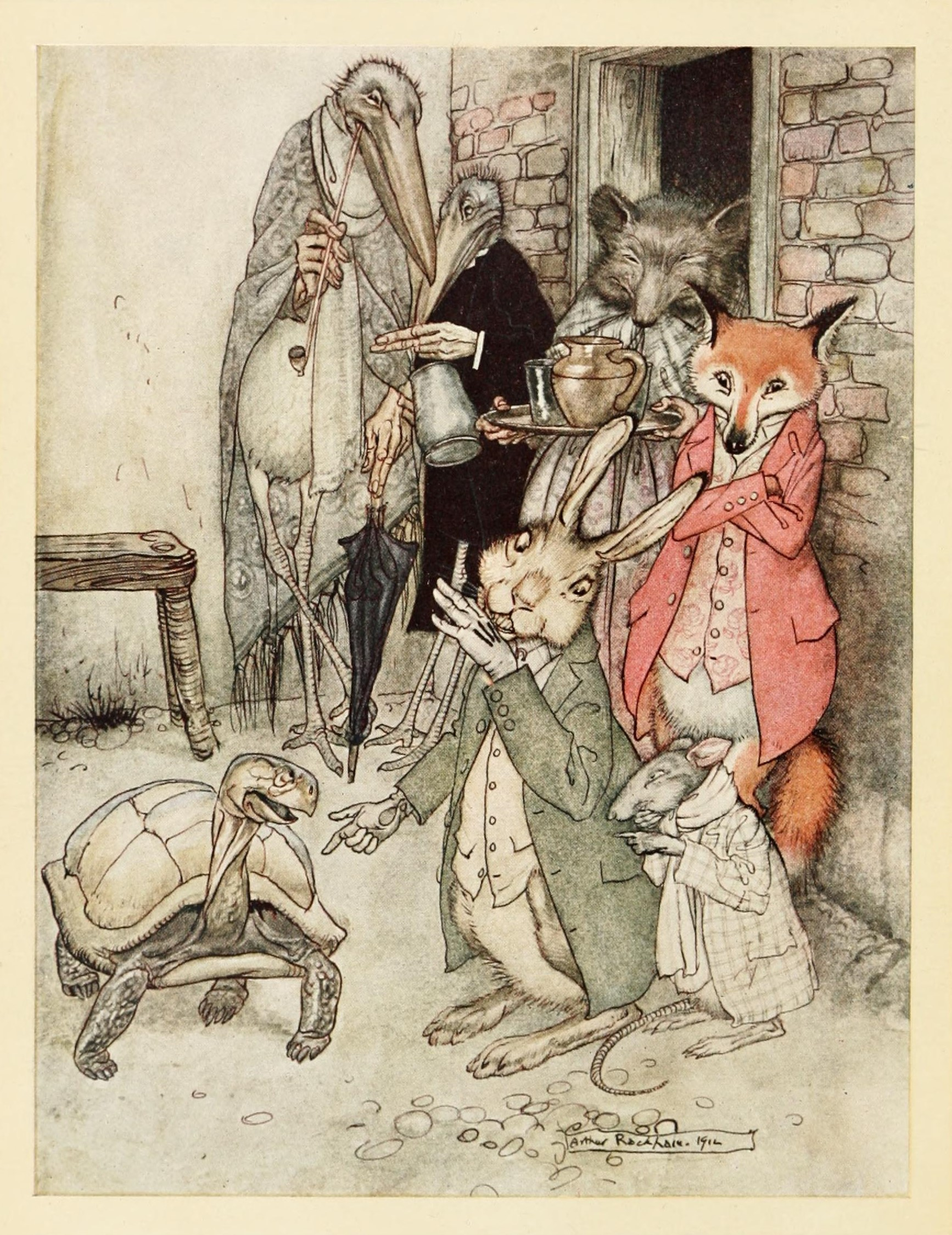
"The Tortoise and the Hare", from an edition of Aesop's Fables illustrated by Arthur Rackham, 1912

"The Tortoise and the Hare" is one of Aesop's Fables and is numbered 226 in the Perry Index. The account of a race between unequal partners has attracted conflicting interpretations. The fable itself is a variant of a common folktale theme in which ingenuity and trickery (rather than doggedness) are employed to overcome a stronger opponent.

== An ambiguous story ==
The story concerns a Hare who ridicules a slow-moving Tortoise. Tired of the Hare's arrogant behaviour, the Tortoise challenges him to a race. The hare soon leaves the tortoise behind and, confident of winning, takes a nap midway through the race. When the Hare awakes, however, he finds that his competitor, crawling slowly but steadily, has arrived before him. The later version of the story in La Fontaine's Fables (VI.10), while more long-winded, differs little from Aesop's.

As in several other fables by Aesop, the lesson it is teaching appears ambiguous. In Classical times, it was not the Tortoise's plucky conduct in taking on a bully that was emphasised but the Hare's foolish over-confidence. An old Greek source comments that "many people have good natural abilities which are ruined by idleness; on the other hand, sobriety, zeal and perseverance can prevail over indolence".

When the fable entered the European emblem tradition, the precept to 'hasten slowly' (festina lente) was recommended to lovers by Otto van Veen in his Emblemata Amorum (1608), using a relation of the story. There, the infant figure of Eros is shown passing through a landscape and pointing to the tortoise as it overtakes the sleeping hare under the motto "perseverance winneth." Later interpreters too have asserted that the fable's moral is the proverbial "the more haste, the worse speed" (Samuel Croxall) or have applied to it the biblical observation that "the race is not to the swift" (Ecclesiastes 9.11).

In the 19th century, the fable was given satirical interpretations. In the social commentary of Charles H. Bennett's The Fables of Aesop translated into Human Nature (1857), the hare is changed to a thoughtful craftsman prostrate under the foot of a capitalist entrepreneur. Lord Dunsany brings out another view in his "The True History of the Tortoise and the Hare" (1915). There, the hare realises the stupidity of the challenge and refuses to proceed any further. The obstinate tortoise continues to the finishing line and is proclaimed the swiftest by his backers. But, continues Dunsany,

the reason that this version of the race is not widely known is that very few of those that witnessed it survived the great forest-fire that happened shortly after. It came up over the weald by night with a great wind. The Hare and the Tortoise and a very few of the beasts saw it far off from a high bare hill that was at the edge of the trees, and they hurriedly called a meeting to decide what messenger they should send to warn the beasts in the forest. They sent the Tortoise.

A century later, Vikram Seth broadened the satire in his verse retelling of the fable in Beastly Tales (1991) and had it both ways. There is nothing to recommend in the behaviour of either protagonist by way of a moral. While the Tortoise's victory bolsters its joyless self-righteousness, the hare-brained loser is taken up by the media and "pampered rotten/ And the tortoise was forgotten".

== Applications ==
In Classical times, a variation of the story was annexed to a philosophical problem by Zeno of Elea in one of many demonstrations that movement is impossible to define satisfactorily. The second of Zeno's paradoxes is that of Achilles and the Tortoise, in which the hero gives the Tortoise a head start in a race. The argument attempts to show that even though Achilles runs faster than the Tortoise, he will never catch up with her because, when Achilles reaches the point at which the Tortoise started, the Tortoise has advanced some distance beyond; when Achilles arrives at that forward point, the Tortoise has again moved forward. Hence Achilles can never catch the Tortoise, no matter how fast he runs, since the Tortoise will always be moving ahead.

The refutation is mathematical (an infinite series of lengths can be a finite length), and since then the name of the fable has been applied to the function described in Zeno's paradox. In mathematics and computer science, the tortoise and the hare algorithm is an alternative name for Floyd's cycle-finding algorithm.

== Illustrations of the fable ==
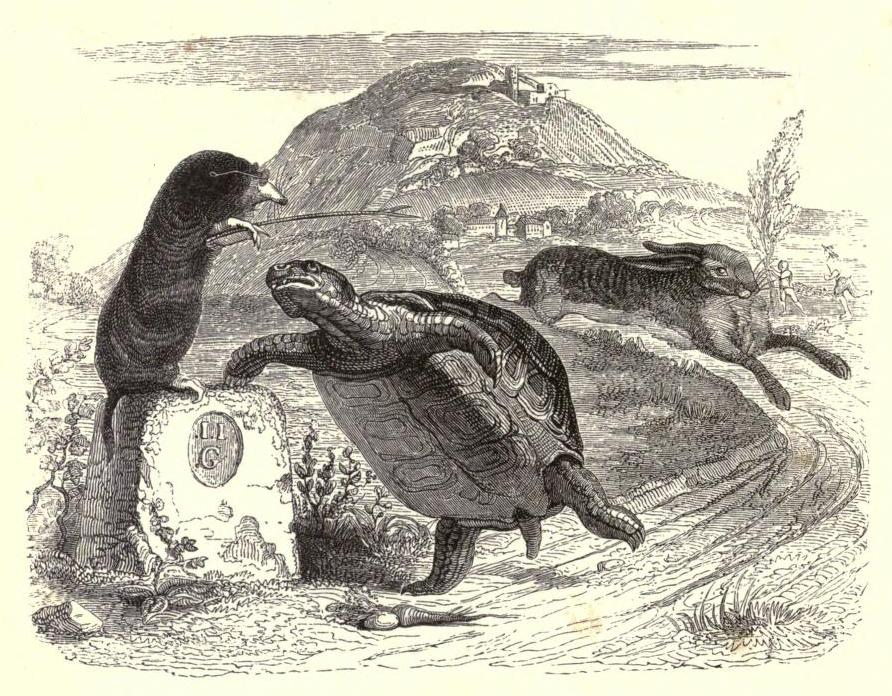
A 19th-century illustration of La Fontaine's Fables by Jean Grandville, showing the tortoise running bipedally.

The fable has a Greek version but no early Latin version. For this reason, it did not begin to appear in printed editions of Aesop's fables until the 16th century, one of the earliest being Bernard Salomon's Les Fables d'Esope Phrygien, mises en Ryme Francoise (1547).

Versions followed from the Netherlands (in Dutch, 1567) and Flanders (in French, 1578) but none in English before Francis Barlow's edition of 1667.

Among the many illustrations of the fable, that by the French caricaturist Jean Grandville is novel in portraying the tortoise as running upright. This is also how he is shown in the Walt Disney cartoon version of "The Tortoise and the Hare" (1935). Another departure from the ordinary in Grandville's etching is the choice of a mole (complete with dark glasses) rather than, as usual, a fox as the judge at the finishing line. Auguste Delierre makes the judge a monkey in the 1883 edition of La Fontaine's fables that he illustrated. La Fontaine says in his rhyme that it does not matter "who it was that judged the race"; his interpreters have obviously taken him at his word.

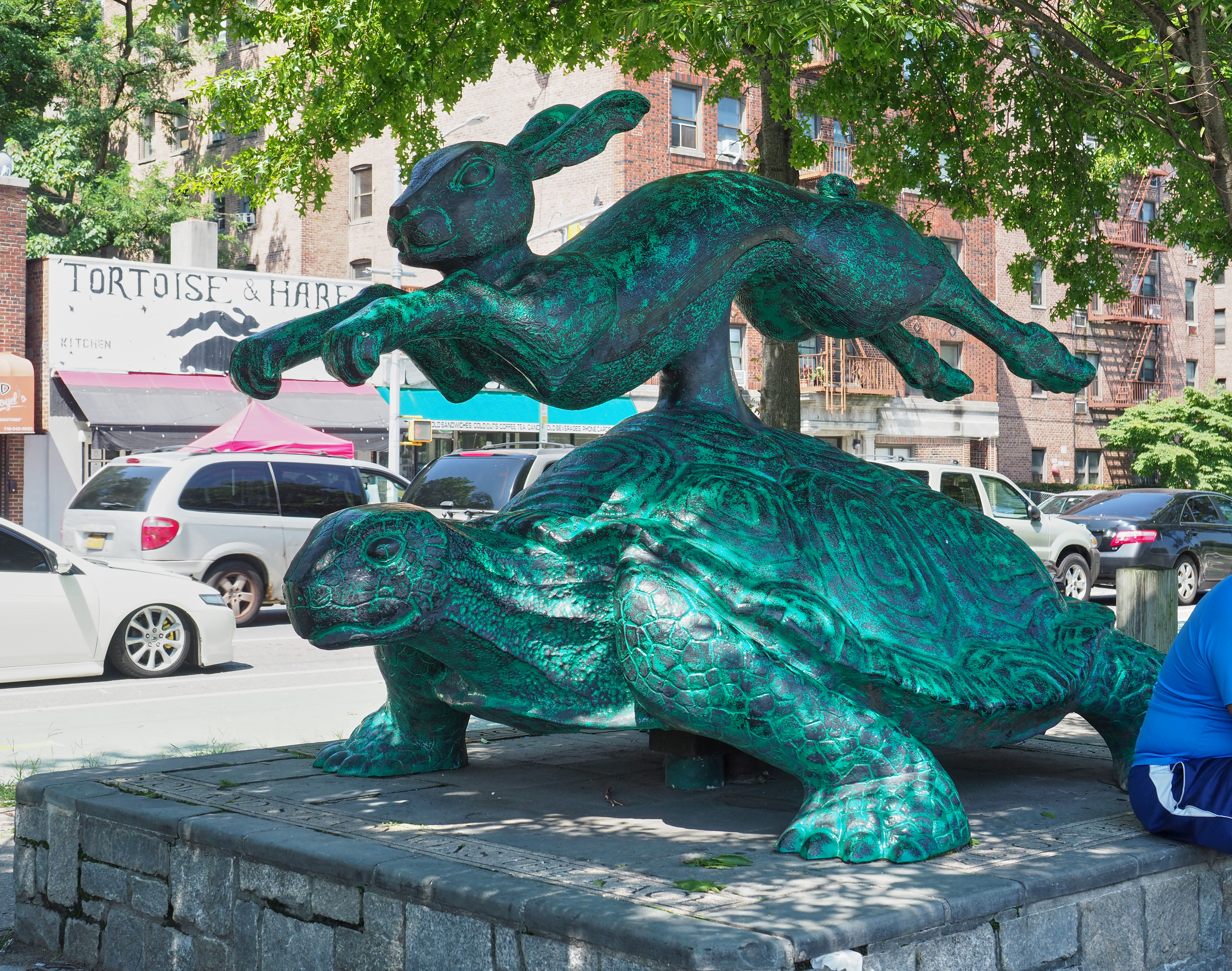
The Van Cortlandt Park sculpture with the Tortoise & Hare Café across the street.

Outside of book production, in the early 17th-century, the Flemish landscape artist Jan Wildens created an oil painting of the fable. The hare enters on the left, racing over an upland road as dawn breaks; the tortoise is nowhere in sight. In the mid-19th century, the French animal painter Philibert Léon Couturier also devoted an oil painting to the fable in which, as in Grandville's illustration, the tortoise is shown racing upright.

In Edward Bawden's composite design of 1970, the hare is depicted racing and lying down at various stages of the race while, in contrast to his sprightly rival, the tortoise keeps going.

Two pieces of popular sculpture were aimed at children. Nancy Schön's was made to commemorate the centenary of the Boston Marathon in 1996 and is sited in Copley Square, the finishing line for the race. The tortoise is shown determinedly stumping forward while the hare has paused to scratch behind its ear. In 1997, the following year, a painted steel sculpture by Michael Browne and Stuart Smith was set up near the cross-country finish line at Van Cortlandt Park in the Bronx. The hare is mounted on the tortoise's shell and appears to be trying to leap over him.

=== Philately ===
The fable has also appeared on postage stamps from various countries:

- Cyprus, in which cartoon characters are depicted on a set of five €0.34 stamps (2011)
- Dahomey, on a 1972 set commemorating 350 years since La Fontaine's birth, in which it figures on the 10 franc stamp
- Dominica, on a 2 cent stamp for Easter 1984, picturing a Disney tortoise carrying Easter eggs as it overtakes the sleeping hare
- France issued surcharged Red Cross stamps in 1978 on which the fable appeared on the 1 franc + 0.25 denomination. It was also included in the 1995 strip of six 2.80 franc stamps commemorating the third centenary of the author's death.
- Greece issued a 1987 set illustrating Aesop's fables, including the tortoise and the hare on the 130 drachma stamp
- Hungary issued a set in 1980 with the fable on the 4 forint stamp
- The Maldives issued a 1990 set in which Disney characters act out the fables; the tortoise and the hare appear on the 15 laree stamp
- Monaco issued a composite 50 centime stamp on the 350th anniversary of La Fontaine's birth in 1971, with this fable included
- Sri Lanka issued a 5 rupee stamp for Child's broadcasting day 2007 that shows the contestants at the starting line

== Musical versions ==
Many allusions to the fable in musical titles are of limited or no relevance, but two interpretive instrumental versions may be noted. The one by Yellowjackets jazz quartet was recorded on their Politics album in 1988. The Anglo-Irish band Flook's title is on their Haven album (2005).

Several verbal settings of Aesop's fable include:

- By W. Langton Williams (c. 1832–1896) in his Aesop's Fables, versified & arranged for the piano forte (London, 1890)
- In Aesop's Fables Interpreted Through Music for voice and piano (New York, 1920) by Mabel Wood Hill (1870–1954). In this the moral stated is that "Plodding wins the race".
- Vincent Persichetti included it as the third piece in his Fables for narrator and orchestra (Op. 23, 1943)
- A poetic version set for children's voices and piano by Edward Hughes in his Songs from Aesop's Fables (1965)
- The cellist Evalyn Steinbock's setting for violin, cello and narrator in 1979
- As the first of Anthony Plog's Aesop's Fables for narrator, piano and horn (1989/93), in which the instruments mimic the pace of the animals
- The first of "Aesop's Fables for narrator and band" (1999) by Scott Watson (b. 1964)
- A setting for solo voice by Lucian Cristofor Tugui (2006)
- Vladimir Cosma, as the sixth piece in Eh bien ! Dansez maintenant (2006), a light-hearted interpretation for narrator and orchestra of La Fontaine's version in the style of a rustic polka
- Movement Three of Julie Giroux's A Symphony of Fables, composed in 2006
- As one of the five pieces in Bob Chilcott's Aesop's Fables for piano and choir (2008)
- A setting for a cappella choir by Darmon Meader (2009)
- As one of David Edgar Walther's 'short operatic dramas', composed in 2009
- Among ten on David P Shortland's Australian recording, Aesop Go HipHop (2012), where the sung chorus after the hip hop narration underlines the fable's moral, "Slow and steady wins the race"

== Folk variants ==
The many other variants of the story in oral folk tradition appear worldwide and are classed as Aarne-Thompson-Uther type 275. In most of these there is a race between unequal partners but most often brain is matched against brawn and the race is won by means of trickery. Broadly this is of two types: either the slower animal jumps on the other's back or tail and hops off at the end when the creature turns round to see where his challenger has got to, or else he is deceived by lookalikes substituting themselves along the course.

Tales with a similar theme emphasizing doggedness have been recorded in Native American culture. In a version from southeastern Native Americans, Hummingbird and Crane agree to race from one ocean to the other. Though Hummingbird flies faster, he stops at night to sleep. Crane, however, flies overnight and is overtaken by Hummingbird later and later during the day, at length coming in first. The ultimate prize differs between versions and includes choice of habitat, the love of a girl, or the right to cut the other down to size.

== See also ==
- Achilles and the Tortoise
- Festina lente
- Law of the handicap of a head start
- The Hare and the Hedgehog
