= A Suitable Boy =

1993 novel by Vikram Seth

A Suitable Boy: A Novel
- First US edition
- Author: Vikram Seth
- Language: English
- Set in: Gangetic Plain, 1951–52
- Publisher: HarperCollins (US); Phoenix House (UK); Little, Brown (Canada)
- Publication date: May 1993
- Publication place: India
- Media type: Print (hardback)
- Pages: 1,349
- ISBN: 0-06-017012-3
- OCLC: 27013350
- Dewey Decimal: 823 20
- LC Class: PR9499.3.S38 S83 1993
- Followed by: A Suitable Girl

A Suitable Boy is a novel by Vikram Seth, published in 1993. With 1,349 pages (1,488 pages in paperback), the English-language book is one of the longest novels published in a single volume.

A Suitable Boy is set in a newly post-independence, post-partition India. The novel follows four families during 18 months, and centres on Mrs. Rupa Mehra's efforts to arrange the marriage of her younger daughter, Lata, to a "suitable boy". Lata is a 19-year-old university student who refuses to be influenced by her domineering mother or opinionated brother, Arun. Her story revolves around the choice she is forced to make between her suitors Kabir, Haresh, and Amit.

It begins in the fictional town of Brahmpur, located along the Ganges. Patna, Brahmpur, along with Calcutta, Delhi, Lucknow and other Indian cities, forms a colourful backdrop for the emerging stories.

The novel alternately offers satirical and earnest examinations of national political issues in the period leading up to the first post-Independence national election of 1952, including Hindu–Muslim strife, the status of lower caste peoples such as the jatav, land reforms and the eclipse of the feudal princes and landlords, academic affairs, abolition of the Zamindari system, family relations and a range of further issues of importance to the characters.

The novel is divided into 19 parts, with each generally focusing on a different subplot. Each part is described in rhyming couplet form on the contents page.

== Plot summary ==
In 1950, 19-year-old Lata Mehra attends the wedding of her older sister, Savita, to Pran Kapoor, a university lecturer. Lata's mother, Mrs. Rupa Mehra, says that it is time for Lata to be married as well, which Lata dismisses as she intends to concentrate on her studies in English literature. Nevertheless, Mrs. Rupa Mehra begins to put out feelers to her friends and family, for a suitable boy for Lata.

While preparing for exams at Brahmpur University, Lata is approached several times by a boy her own age named Kabir. The two begin meeting in secret, and after a short while Lata feels she is in love with him. Wanting to know more about him, Lata asks Malati, her best friend, to try and find out information about him. Shortly after, Malati telephones Lata and informs her that Kabir, whose last name is "Durrani", is Muslim. Lata is horrified, realizing her mother would never permit her, a Hindu, to marry a Muslim boy. Mrs Rupa Mehra learns of Lata's meetings with Kabir and confronts her, making plans to immediately bring Lata to Calcutta, where her older brother Arun lives. The next morning, Lata sneaks out to meet Kabir and desperately begs him to run away with her, but he refuses, saying that it would be foolish to do so. Feeling heartbroken, Lata agrees to go to Calcutta with her mother.

...(R)eviewers and critics alike have frequently compared it to Tolstoy's War and Peace, as well as to fictions by British novelists from more than a century ago, including George Eliot's Middlemarch, Charles Dickens' Bleak House, William Makepeace Thackeray's Vanity Fair, Henry Fielding's Tom Jones and Samuel Richardson's Clarissa.

At the train station, Lata is spotted by Haresh Khanna, an ambitious shoe manufacturer who is involved in business with Kedarnath Tandon, the husband of Pran's older sister, Veena. He is intrigued by her beauty and sadness.

In Calcutta, Lata is surprised to find herself enjoying her time with her brother, and his wife Meenakshi. She meets Meenakshi's eccentric family, the Chatterjis, and bonds with Meenakshi's older brother, Amit, an England-educated poet who is under pressure from his family to marry. Though Amit initially only intends on being friendly to Lata as a member of his extended family, he begins to consider her as a possible wife. Mrs. Rupa Mehra is horrified when she realises that Amit and Lata might be considering marriage, as she dislikes Meenakshi and therefore disapproves of the Chatterjis. She goes to Delhi to renew her efforts to find a spouse for Lata. By accident she is introduced to Haresh Khanna and decides he is suitable for Lata. Despite the fact that he is in love with another woman (whom he cannot marry due to her family's objection), Haresh agrees to meet Lata. Lata finds the idea of marrying Haresh ridiculous but nevertheless has an agreeable time with him and gives him permission to write to her.

Returning home she hears that Kabir was involved in reuniting her sister-in-law Veena with her young son after a mass stampede separated them. She nevertheless vows to forget about Kabir only to be surprised when they are both cast in the university's production of Twelfth Night. During rehearsals her brother-in-law Pran is hospitalised, and his wife Savita gives birth. Lata takes on a more prominent role in taking care of her sister and niece which results in her realising her mother is only trying to ensure her happiness and safety. She begins corresponding more warmly with Haresh and despite still being attracted to Kabir tells him that she is no longer interested in marrying him.

Haresh loses his managerial job at the shoe factory but inveigles his way into a lesser position as the foreman at the Praha shoe factory with promise of upward mobility. His new circumstance fails to impress Arun and Meenakshi who are also biased against him as they are aware of Amit's attraction to Lata and want to encourage that match.

In the new year the Mehra family once again travels to Calcutta to spend time with Arun and Meenakshi and to reconnect with Haresh. At a cricket match Haresh, Kabir and Amit all meet and recognise that they are all loosely acquainted, but fail to realise that they are all, in one way or another, courting Lata. Kabir is in Calcutta trying to work up the courage to speak to Lata, however he fails to do so and Lata receives a letter from her best friend informing her that Kabir was spotted in an intimate conversation with another woman. Haresh is more persistent in his courtship of Lata, but after she off-handedly calls him mean, he takes offence and their relationship comes to a standstill.

In the new year, based on Kabir's invitation, Amit comes to speak at Lata's school. She reconnects with Kabir where she learns that the information he was courting another woman was false. However she tells him she is seriously writing to Haresh and is strongly considering marrying him. Amit also takes this opportunity to more seriously propose to Lata. Lata meets Kabir one last time where she realises that the passion she feels for him is not the basis for a good marriage. After receiving an apologetic letter from Haresh renewing his offer of marriage and a second letter from Arun, strongly encouraging her to reject Haresh, Lata decides once and for all to marry Haresh.

Concurrent to the main plot is the story of Maan Kapoor, a brother to her brother-in-law Pran. Maan is the feckless youngest child of respected politician Mahesh Kapoor, the state Minister of Revenue. At a Holi celebration, Maan sees the courtesan singer, Saeeda Bai, perform. He visits her house and begins to court her. They become lovers. Saeeda Bai later feels that her feelings for him are interfering with her work and reputation. She sends him away with her young sister Tasneem's Urdu teacher, Rasheed, to his remote village under the pretence of wanting Maan to learn flawless Urdu. Maan spends the time becoming acquainted with Rasheed's family who are politically influential but immoral and corrupt.

When Maan returns to Brahmpur he resumes his love affair with Saeeda Bai and gains favour with his father who decides to run for office again in the seat where Rasheed's family lives. After campaigning with his father, Maan returns to Saeeda Bai's house where he sees his friend Firoz and believes from veiled comments of Saeeda Bai that the two have been having a love affair behind his back. In reality, Firoz had come to propose to Tasneem, when Saeeda Bai reveals that Tasneem is in fact her secret daughter and Firoz's half-sister. In the ensuing confusion Maan stabs Firoz in a fit of jealousy. The scandal that follows causes his father to lose his seat and his mother to die after a series of strokes.

However once Firoz recovers he insists that the stabbing was caused by his own clumsiness and his friend Maan is made a free man.

The wedding between Lata and Haresh takes place with joy to all except Kabir who is invited but does not come. A few days later Lata and Haresh take a train to his home to begin their new lives together.

== Characters in A Suitable Boy ==
Four family trees are provided in the beginning of the novel to help readers keep track of the complicated interwoven family networks:

Combined family tree

- The Mehras
  - Mrs. Rupa Mehra, a mother searching for a suitable boy for her youngest daughter
  - Raghubir Mehra, her deceased husband
    - Arun, Mrs. Mehra's oldest son (married to Meenakshi Chatterji)
      - Aparna, daughter of Arun and Meenakshi
    - Varun
    - Savita (married to Pran Kapoor)
      - Uma Kapoor, daughter of Savita and Pran
    - Lata, whose arranged marriage forms the basis of the main plot
- The Kapoors
  - Mr. Mahesh Kapoor (state Minister of Revenue) and Mrs. Mahesh Kapoor
    - Veena (married to Kedarnath Tandon)
      - Bhaskar Tandon, son of Veena and Kedarnath
    - Pran (married to Savita Mehra)
    - Maan
- The Khans
  - The Nawab Sahib of Baitar
    - Zainab, his daughter
      - Hassan and Abbas, her sons
    - Imtiaz, a doctor
    - Firoz, a lawyer
  - Ustad Majeed Khan, a famed musician, relation to the family (if any) not specified
  - Begum Abida Khan, politician (sister-in-law of the Nawab Sahib)
- The Chatterjis
  - Mr. Justice Chatterji and Mrs. Chatterji
    - Amit, eldest son and internationally acclaimed poet and author. A prominent love interest of Lata
    - Meenakshi (married to Arun Mehra)
    - Dipankar
    - Kakoli
    - Tapan

Some other prominent characters, not mentioned above, include:

- Dr Durrani, mathematician at the university that Kabir and Lata attend
  - Kabir Durrani, a love interest of Lata and a central hub of one of the main themes of the novel. Kabir is a successful player on the university cricket team. Lata and Kabir have a brief, intense courtship, with ramifications echoing through the rest of the novel.
  - Hashim Durrani, Kabir's brother
- Haresh Khanna, an enterprising and determined shoe-businessman, who is also a love interest of the heroine
- Nehru
- Malati, best friend of Lata
- Mrs Tandon
  - Kedarnath Tandon (married to Veena Kapoor)
- Saeeda Bai, courtesan and musician
- Tasneem, the daughter of Saeeda Bai, always presented as her sister
- Bibbo, servant at Saeeda Bai's house
- Rasheed, student at Brahmpur University; Tasneem's Urdu teacher
- Ishaq, sarangi player
- S S Sharma, Chief Minister
- Agarwal, Home Minister
  - Priya, his daughter (married to Ram Vilas Goyal)
- Simran, a Sikh woman and former love interest of Haresh Khanna
- Kalpana Gaur, friend of the Mehra family
- Billy Irani, friend of Arun Mehra, later has an affair with Meenakshi
  - Shireen, his fiancée
- Bishwanath Bhaduri
- Abdus Salam
- Raja of Marh
  - Rajkumar of Marh, his son
- Dr Bilgrami
- Professor Mishra, an English professor
- Dr Ila Chattopadhay, an English professor
- Hans, an Austrian diplomat
- The Guppi, inhabitant of Salimpur
- Netaji, Rasheed's uncle
- Sahgal
- Makhijani, indulgent poet
- Sandeep Lahiri
- Waris, servant at the Baitar Fort and competes with Mahesh Kapoor in the General Election
- The Munshi, in charge of the Baitar Fort
- Jagat Ram, a shoemaker
- Badrinath
- Dr Kishen Chand Seth
- Professor Nowrojee, who runs the university literary club attended by Kabir and Lata
- Sunil Patwardhan, mathematician at Brahmpur University
- Parvati, Mrs Rupa Mehra's stepmother

== Development ==
Seth has stated that the biggest influence on writing A Suitable Boy was the five-volume 18th century Chinese novel The Story of the Stone by Cao Xueqin.

== Possible sequel ==
A sequel, to be called A Suitable Girl, was due for publication in 2017. As of April 2026 this was still unpublished. In an article that appeared in the Khaleej Times on 4 November 2019, Vikram Seth was quoted as saying that he had not yet devised an ending for the book.

== Real people and events ==
- For the character of Tapan, the youngest in Chatterjee family, Seth drew on his own experiences of being bullied at The Doon School in India.
- The Praha Shoe Company of the novel is modeled on Bata Shoes.
- Pul mela is based on the Kumbh Festival, which takes place at Sangam, Allahabad.

== Critical reception ==
On 5 November 2019, the BBC included A Suitable Boy on its list of the 100 most inspiring novels.

The Independent wrote that "the movement and music of the writing in A Suitable Boy take time to absorb, but its unobtrusive, powerfully rational sweetness eventually compels the reader to its way of seeing."

Daniel Johnson wrote in The Times: "A Suitable Boy is not merely one of the longest novels in English: it may also prove to be the most fecund as well as the most prodigious work of the latter half of this century - perhaps even the book to restore the serious reading public's faith in the contemporary novel. I have little doubt that... Vikram Seth is already the best writer of his generation", while Eugene Robinson of the Washington Post compared Seth favourably to Tolstoy.

Christopher Hitchens, in Vanity Fair, gave the novel a glowing review, saying the prose "has a deceptive lightness and transparency to it".

The book was among the contenders in a 2014 list by The Daily Telegraph of the 10 all-time greatest Asian novels, and Emma Lee-Potter of The Independent listed it as one of the 12 best Indian novels.

== Adaptation ==
A six-part series adapted from the novel and titled A Suitable Boy, directed by Mira Nair, written by Andrew Davies and starring Tabu, Ishaan Khatter, Tanya Maniktala and Rasika Dugal, was broadcast on BBC One in the United Kingdom from 26 July 2020. The production is the first BBC historical drama with a cast completely featuring people of colour, except for Austrian opera singer Thomas Weinhappel as 'Hans'. The series is streaming on Acorn TV in the US and Canada and Netflix in other territories.
