= Philippe Honoré (violinist) =

French violinist

- Born: 21 March 1967 (age 59); Lyon, France
- Genre: Classical
- Occupation: Violinist
- Instrument: 1786 Eberle violin
- Years active: 1988 – present
- Labels: EMI, Decca, Naxos Records, ASV Records, Meridian Records, Signum Records
- Website: www.philippehonore.com

Philippe Honoré (born 21 March 1967) is a French violinist who has been a regular recitalist in France and the United Kingdom. He was appointed Violin Professor at the Royal Academy of Music in London in September 2012. He has performed widely in broadcast recitals on French radio and television.

== Life and career ==
Honoré divides his busy schedule between solo work, chamber music, and collaboration with leading orchestras. He was a principal player with the Philharmonia Orchestra (from 2005 to 2011). After receiving top honours from the Paris Conservatoire and the Royal Academy of Music in London, he was made a Laureat of the Yehudi Menuhin Foundation in France in 1992. He was awarded an Honorary Associateship by the Royal Academy of Music in 2001.

Honoré is a former member of the Vellinger Quartet and a founder member of the Mobius Ensemble. As such, he has appeared in some of the most prestigious venues abroad (such as Amsterdam's Concertgebouw) and in the UK (such as the Wigmore Hall and the South Bank in London). He has appeared as a soloist performing Beethoven, Mozart, Bach, and Vivaldi concerti, as well as Ravel's Tzigane.

Honoré regularly appears as guest leader with some of the UK's best orchestras. He has made numerous solo and chamber music recordings. His solo violin performances on the Decca album An Equal Music are regularly featured on both Classic FM and Radio 3. The novel of that name by the author Vikram Seth was inspired by and dedicated to him.

Honoré's collaboration with the composer Alec Roth over a recent four-year project earned him great critical acclaim. The performances took place at the Salisbury, Chelsea, and Lichfield Festivals. BBC Radio 3 recorded and broadcast these annual concerts, in which, in addition to the world premières of Roth's work, Honoré also played solo Bach and Ysaÿe sonatas. The Times described his account of Roth's solo work in 2007 as "magically played". A studio recording by Honoré of Roth's Ponticelli for solo violin was released by Signum records in November 2011.

Honoré gave a performance of the entirety of this four-year-long project at the Music and Beyond Festival in Ottawa in July 2012. The series of these four concerts including Songs In Time Of War, Ponticelli, The Traveller, and the Seven Elements Suite was reviewed by the Wordpress Music and Beyond blog, which described Honoré as both a violin virtuoso and a super violinist and the performances were referred to as spine-tingling.

Honoré's work with the Mobius Ensemble was awarded favourable reviews.

== Published works ==
=== Albums ===
- 1999: Chamber Recital
- 2000: An Equal Music
- 2004: Strings Attached
- 2004: Howells: Rhapsodic Quintet, Violin Sonata #3
- 2008: Songs in Time of War
- 2011: Shared Ground

== Notable instruments ==
Honoré's violin is an Eberle, made in 1786 in Naples.
