= Christian Jank =

German scenic painter and stage designer (1833–1888)

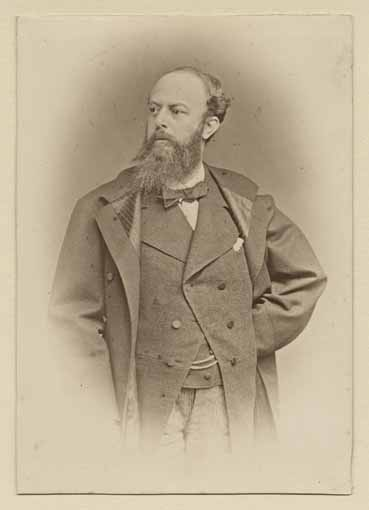
Christian Jank c. 1880

Christian Jank (15 July 1833 – 25 November 1888) was a German scenic painter and stage designer.

Jank was born in Munich, the Bavarian capital. Here he originally worked as a scenic painter. Among other things he was involved in the scenery for Richard Wagner's opera Lohengrin. He was also enlisted as a stage designer for the 1862 Fairytale Maskenfest, spending months painting an 800-meter-long, 50-meter-high panoramic backdrop with a castle overlooking the Rhine.

His work piqued the interest of Ludwig II, who commissioned him to create concepts for his architectural projects inspired by Wagner. Jank's historistic drafts were the basis for Neuschwanstein Castle, which was built starting in 1869 by Eduard Riedel and later Georg von Dollmann. Jank was also involved in the interior of Linderhof Palace. His concepts for Falkenstein Castle could not be realized, as the project was abandoned after the king's death in 1886.

Jank himself died in Munich on 25 November 1888.

== Image gallery ==
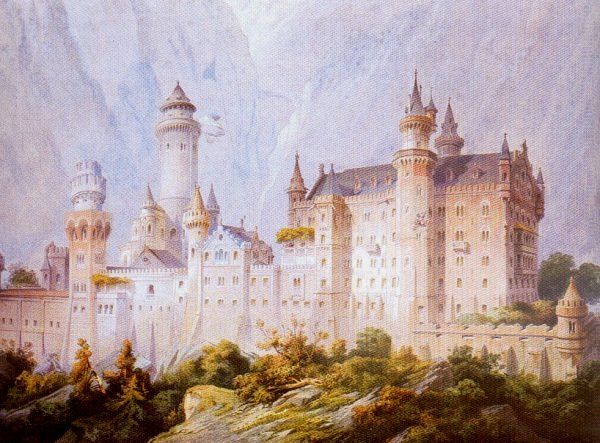
Concept for Neuschwanstein Castle (c. 1883)

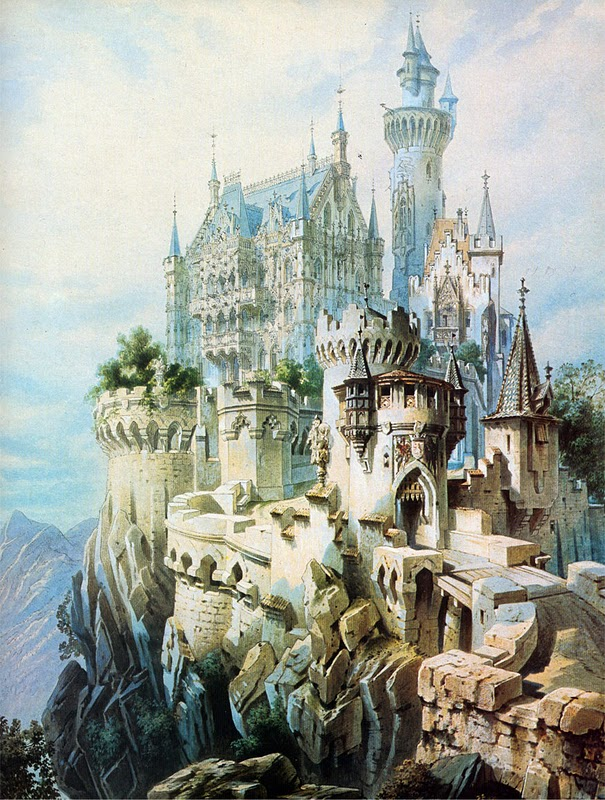
Concept for Falkenstein Castle (c. 1883)
