= Mappings (poetry collection) =

Book by Vikram Seth

First flexiback edition

Mappings is a first book of poems by Vikram Seth originally published by the Writers Workshop, Calcutta (now Kolkata), as a hand-set, hand-printed and hand-bound volume ("in Hardback or Flexiback") in 1980 or 1981 (the Flexiback edition copyright date is 1981). With the growth of Seth's reputation, the volume has been reprinted by mainstream publishers (ISBN 0-670-05846-7).

Original poems range from a cautionary tale in rhyming couplets ("The Tale Of Melon City"), through Seth's characteristic musings - some serious and some light-hearted - on life, love and landscape, to the title poem reflecting on the different selves "mapped" by his earlier writings. Interspersed with these are translations (one each) from the Chinese of Du Fu, the Urdu of Faiz Ahmed Faiz, the German of Heinrich Heine and the Hindi of Suryakant Tripathi Nirala.
