= Adagia =

Collection of Greek and Latin proverbs, compiled by Erasmus of Rotterdam

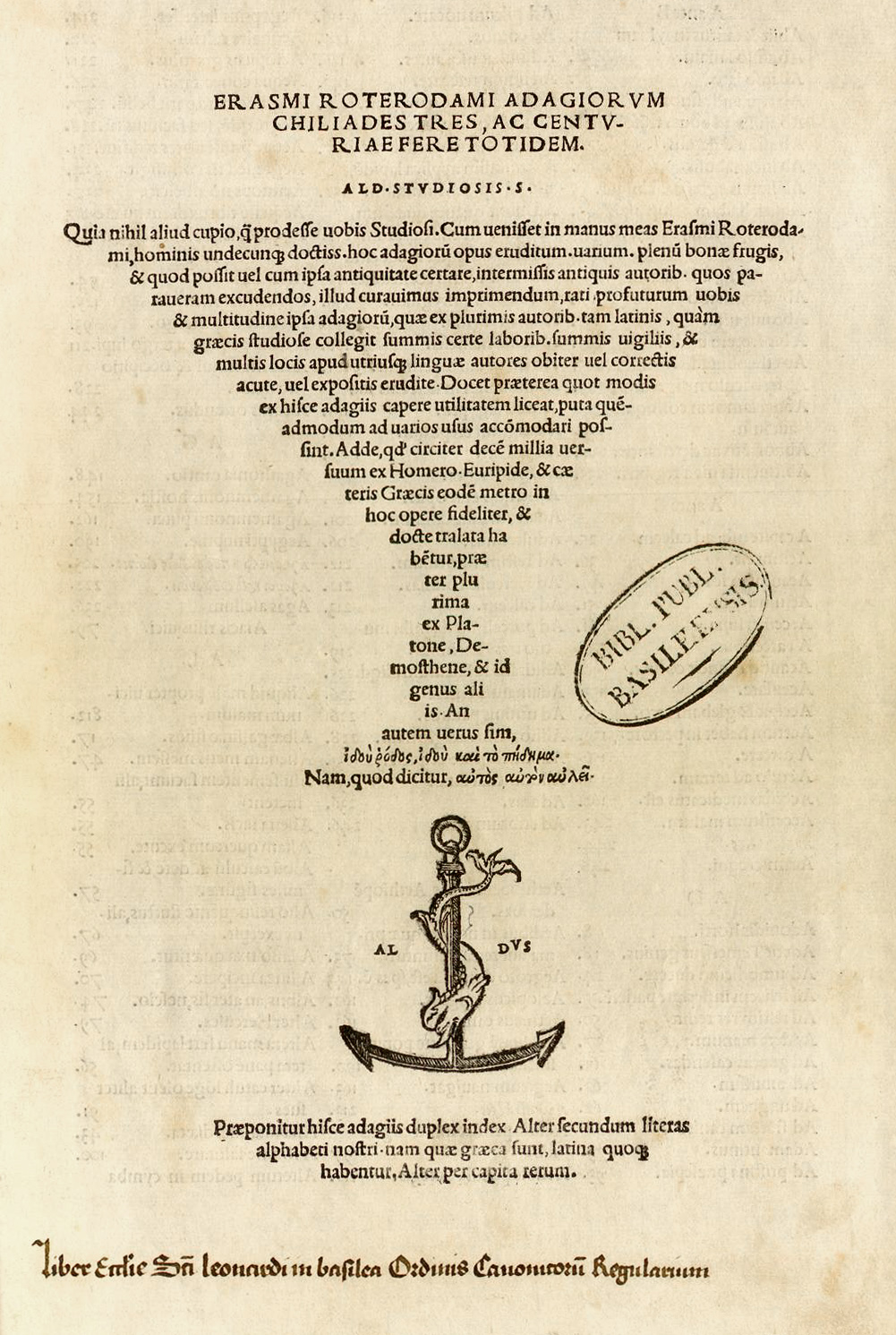
Title page of the 1508 edition, printed by Aldus Manutius, Venice

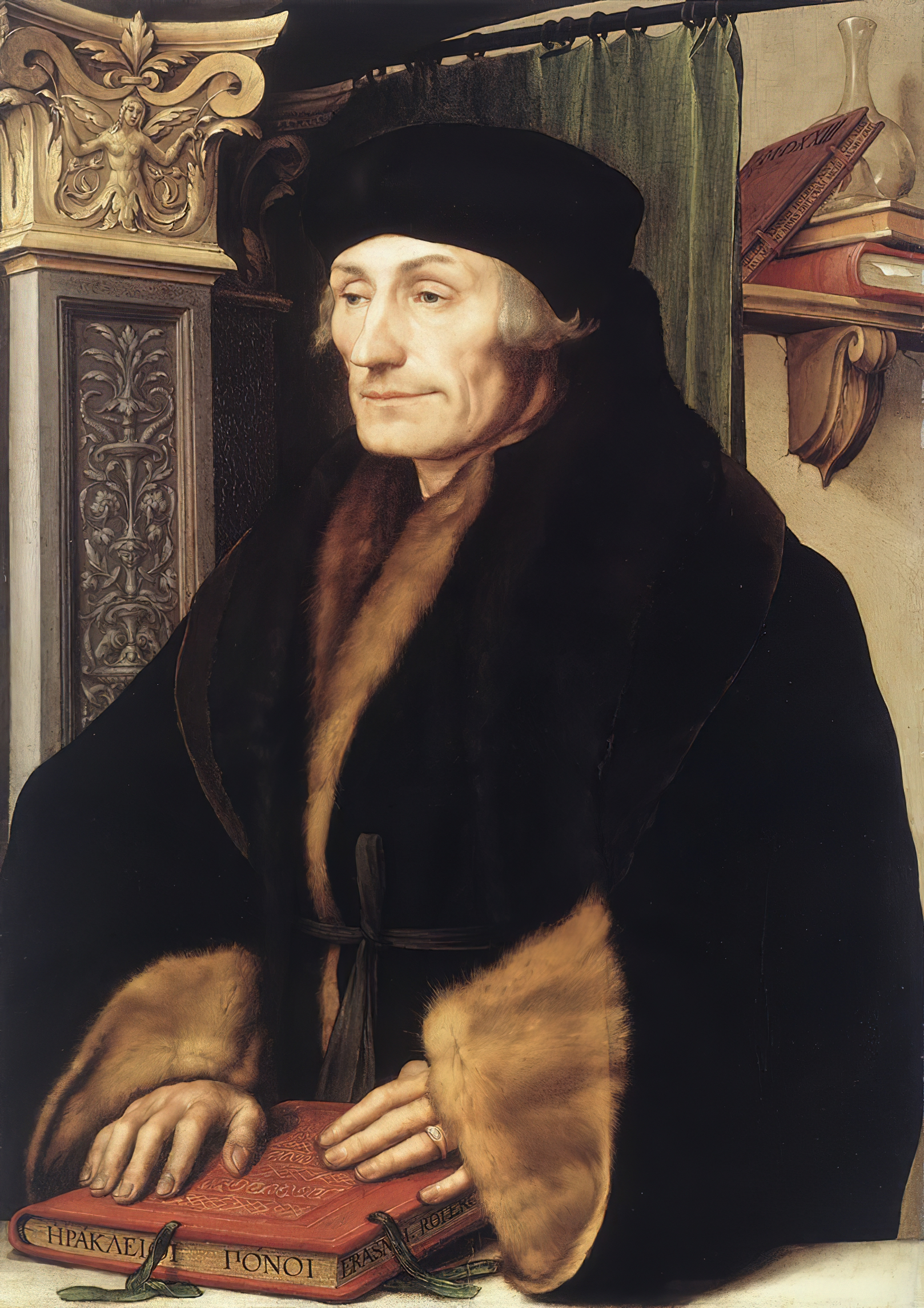
Portrait of Erasmus by Hans Holbein the Younger, 1523

Adagia (singular adagium) is the title of an annotated collection of Greek and Latin proverbs, compiled during the Renaissance by Dutch humanist Desiderius Erasmus Roterodamus. Erasmus' repository of proverbs is "one of the most monumental ... ever assembled" (Speroni, 1964, p. 1).

The first edition, titled Collectanea Adagiorum, was published in Paris in 1500, in a slim quarto of around eight hundred entries. By 1508, after his stay in Italy, Erasmus had expanded the collection (now called Adagiorum chiliades tres or "Three thousands of proverbs") to over 3,000 items, many accompanied by richly annotated commentaries, some of which were brief essays on political and moral topics. The work continued to expand right up to the author's death in 1536 (to a final total of 4,151 entries), confirming the fruit of Erasmus' vast reading in ancient literature.

== Commonplace examples from Adagia ==
Some of the adages have become commonplace in many European languages. Equivalents in English include:

- As though in a mirror
- Between a stone and a shrine (Between a rock and a hard place)
- The blind leading the blind
- The bowels of the earth
- The cart before the horse
- Complete the circle
- Crocodile tears
- Dog in the manger
- The dog is worthy of his dinner
- A dung beetle hunting an eagle
- Even a child can see it
- God helps those who help themselves
- Golden handcuffs
- The grass is greener over the fence
- Hanging by a thread
- Happy in one's own skin
- Hatched from the same egg
- He blows his own trumpet
- His heart was in his boots
- I gave as bad as I got (I gave as good as I got)
- In the land of the blind, the one-eyed man is king
- Kill two birds with one stone
- Let the cobbler stick to his last (Stick to your knitting)
- Like father, like son
- Like teaching an old man a new language (Can't teach an old dog new tricks)
- A living corpse
- Many hands make light work
- Many parasangs ahead (Miles ahead)
- More haste, less speed
- A necessary evil
- Necessity is the mother of invention
- Neither fish nor flesh
- Neither with bad things nor without them (Women: can't live with 'em, can't live without 'em)
- No sooner said than done
- Not worth a snap of the fingers
- Nowhere near the mark
- One man's meat is another man's poison
- One step at a time
- One swallow doesn't make a summer
- One to one
- Out of tune
- A point in time
- Prevention is better than cure
- A rare bird
- A rolling stone gathers no moss
- Rome wasn't built in a day
- Ship-shape
- A snail's pace
- There's many a slip 'twixt the cup and the lip
- Think before you start
- Time reveals all things
- Time tempers grief (Time heals all wounds)
- To be in the same boat
- To break the ice
- To call a spade a spade
- To cut to the quick
- To dangle the bait
- To die of laughing
- To grind one's teeth
- To have an iron in the fire
- To have one foot in Charon's boat (To have one foot in the grave)
- To lead one by the nose
- To leave no stone unturned
- To lift a finger
- To look a gift horse in the mouth
- To show one's heels
- To sleep on it
- To squeeze water out of a stone
- To swallow the hook
- To throw cold water on
- To walk the tightrope
- To walk on tiptoe
- To weigh anchor
- Up to both ears (Up to his eyeballs)
- We cannot all do everything
- What's done cannot be undone
- Where there's life, there's hope
- With a fair wind
- You have touched the issue with a needle-point (To have nailed it)

Seventy of the Adages were from Aesop's fables.

== Context ==
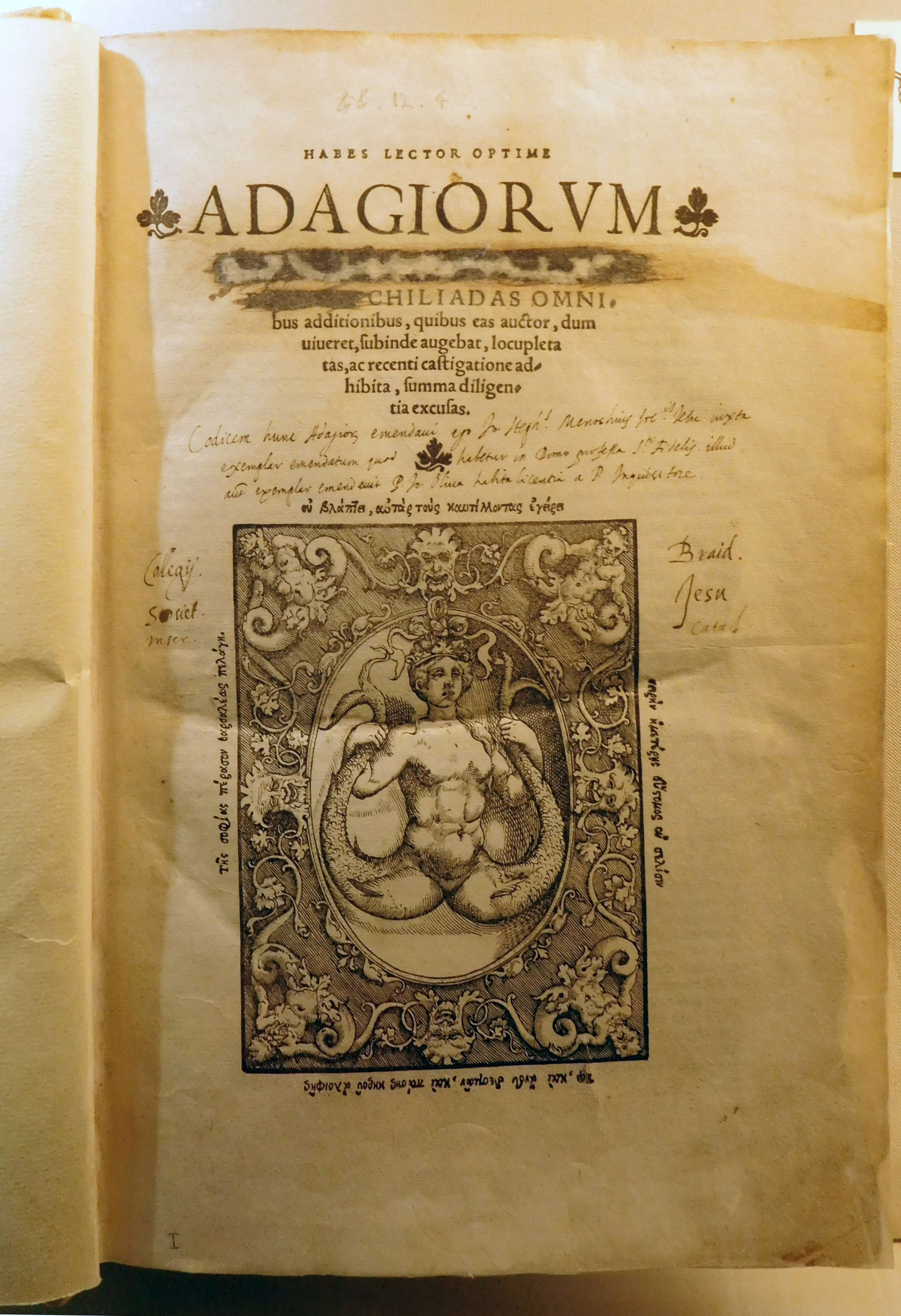
Adagia title page 1537 edition (V. Ravani e soci, Venice), author's name struck out by Jesuits. Biblioteca di Brera

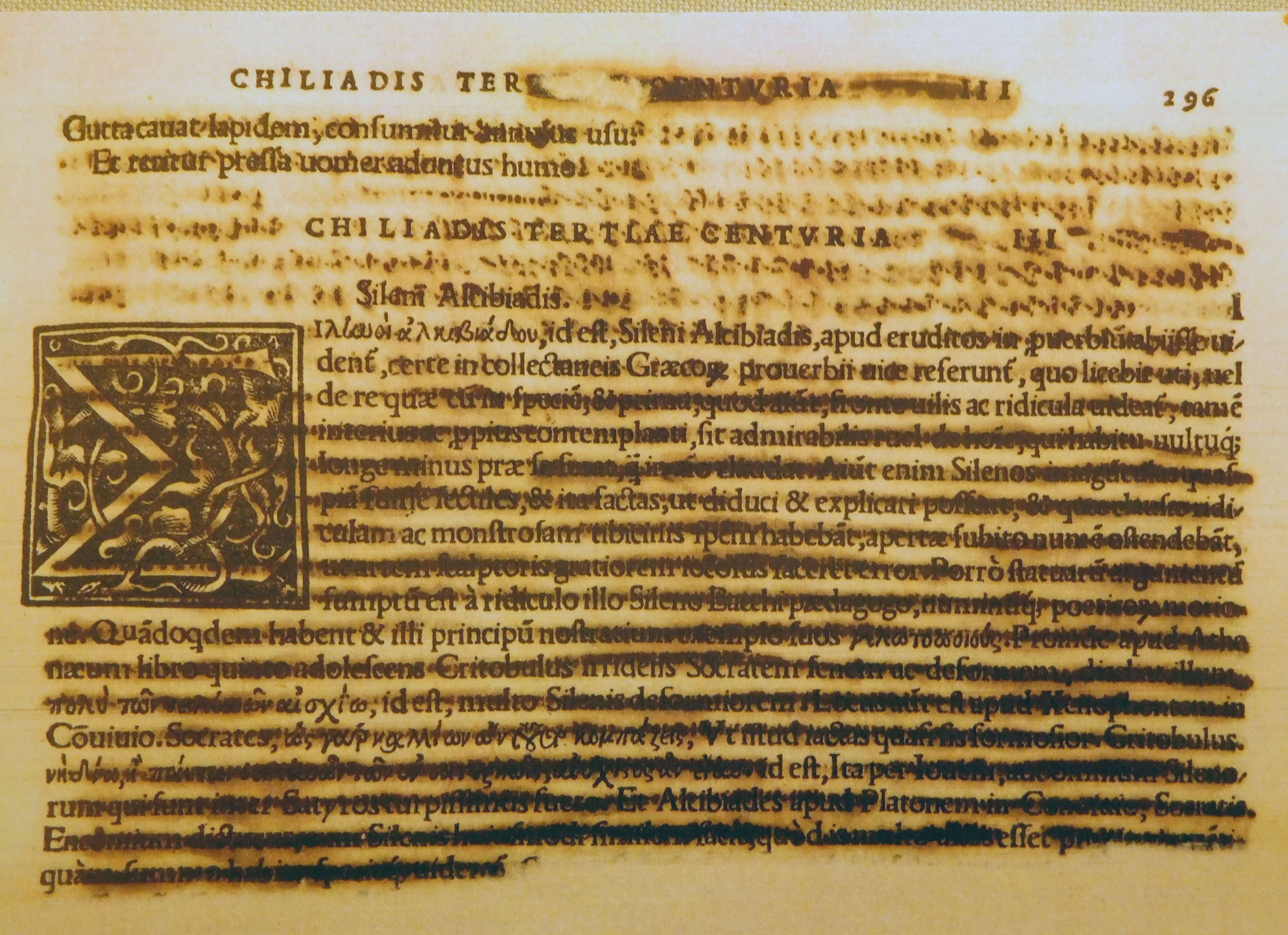
Adagia 1537 edition page 296, Sileni Alcibiadis, heavily censored by Jesuits

The work reflects a typical Renaissance attitude toward classical texts: to wit, that they were fit for appropriation and amplification, as expressions of a timeless wisdom first uncovered by the classical authors. It is also an expression of the contemporary humanism; the Adagia could only have happened via the developing intellectual environment in which careful attention to a broader range of classical texts produced a much fuller picture of the literature of antiquity than had been possible in medieval Europe. In a period in which sententiæ were often marked by special fonts and footnotes in printed texts, and in which the ability to use classical wisdom to bolster modern arguments was a critical part of scholarly and even political discourse, it is not surprising that Erasmus' Adagia was among the most popular volumes of the century.

Erasmus originally intended to include Biblical adages, parables and imagery, however this was too ambitious; he later addressed these with his New Testament Annotations and Paraphrases.

Source: Erasmus, Desiderius. Adages in Collected Works of Erasmus. Trans. R.A.B Mynors et al. Volumes 31–36. Toronto: University of Toronto Press, 1982–2006. (A complete annotated translation into English. There is a one-volume selection: Erasmus, Desiderius. Adages. Ed. William Barker. Toronto: University of Toronto Press, 2001.)

=== Between friends all is common ===
The place of honour as first entry of the Adagia is (Latin: amicorum communia omnia.) Erasmus' commentary goes beyond friendship to discussion of the attitude towards property and communal ownership by classical Greek philosophers and Christ. Not surprising for someone under a religious vow of poverty and common ownership, Erasmus comes down on the side of friendly sharing of life and property.

=== Sileni Alcibiadis (The Sileni of Alcibiadis) ===
An unprepossessing exterior may hide a beautiful interior (and vice versa.) The incarnation of Christ is the highest example.

=== Bidden or unbidden, God is always there ===
Erasmus traces this back through the Romans (Latin: Vocatus atque non vocatus, Deus aderit) to a Spartan saying. Carl Jung reputedly had this enscribed on his study door.
