= An Equal Music =

1999 novel by Vikram Seth

- First edition cover
- Author: Vikram Seth
- Language: English
- Genre: Romance
- Publisher: Phoenix House
- Publication date: 8 April 1999
- Publication place: United Kingdom
- Media type: Print (hardback & paperback)
- Pages: 383 pages (first edition, hardcover), 400 pages (hardcover edition) & 400 pages (paperback edition)
- ISBN: 1-86159-117-9 (first edition, hardcover), (ISBN 0-7679-0291-2 (hardcover edition) & ISBN 0-375-70924-X (paperback edition)
- OCLC: 41381950
- LC Class: PR9499.3.S38

An Equal Music (1999) is a novel by Vikram Seth.

== Plot ==
The plot concerns Michael, a professional violinist, who never forgot his love for Julia, a pianist he met as a student in Vienna. They meet again after a decade, and conduct a secret affair, though she is married and has one child. Their musical careers are affected by this affair and the knowledge that Julia is going deaf.

A recurring element throughout the plot is the pair's performance of Beethoven's Piano Trio Opus 1 No.3, which they first perform in their college days.

Seth together with Philippe Honoré marketed a double CD of the music mentioned in An Equal Music, performed by Honoré.

== Reception ==
The book was especially well received by musical fans, who noted the accuracy of Seth's descriptions of music.

Paolo Isotta, one of Italy's most significant music critics, wrote in the influential newspaper Il Corriere della Sera of the Italian translation that no European writer had ever shown such a knowledge of European classical music, nor had any European novel before managed to convey the psychology, the technical abilities, even the human potentialities of those who practise music for a living.

== Works referenced ==
Several musical works figure prominently in An Equal Music. Among these are the Trout Quintet by Franz Schubert, the String Quintet in C minor by Ludwig van Beethoven, and The Lark Ascending by Ralph Vaughan Williams.
