= Three Chinese Poets =

Collection of translated poetry

First edition (publ. Penguin/Viking)

Three Chinese Poets is a 1992 collection of Vikram Seth's English translations of poetry by Wang Wei, Li Bai and Du Fu.

These three poets were contemporaries and are considered to be among the greatest Chinese poets by many later scholars. The three have been described as a Buddhist recluse, a Taoist immortal and a Confucian sage respectively. Though this trichotomy has been criticised as simplistic and artificial, it can act as a guiding approximation. They lived in the Tang dynasty and the political strife at that time affected all of their lives very much and this impact is evident in the poetry of all three. It is not clear whether Wang Wei and Li Bai ever met, but they had a mutual friend in Meng Haoran. Li Bai and Du Fu did meet and Du Fu greatly admired Li Bai.

In the introduction to Three Chinese Poets, Seth, who has a Stanford ABD in Chinese studies and has translated other Chinese works, talks about the influence of translations on his life and work. He highlights Charles Johnston's translation of Aleksandr Pushkin's Eugene Onegin, Richard Wilbur's translation of Molière's Tartuffe and Robert Fitzgerald's translation of the Iliad. He writes that he wanted to avoid the approach taken by Ezra Pound, which was to prioritise creating a good poem, using an approximate translation based on the translator's deep understanding of the poem. Seth preferred to follow the example of the translators he admired, prioritising fidelity and preserving formal features such as rhyme. He stresses the difficulty of preserving meaning and word associations when translating poetry. He also notes that any satisfaction derived from the tonality of the original poems is necessarily lost because of the non-tonality of English.

Eleven of Seth's translations of Du Fu from this volume were later included in the first section of The Rivered Earth (2011), a collection of libretti written by Seth and set to music by Alec Roth.

== Contents ==
- Wang Wei
  - Deer Park
  - Birdsong Brook
  - Lady Xi
  - Grieving for Meng Haoran
  - Remembering my Brothers in Shandong on the Double-Ninth Festival
  - The Pleasures of the Country
  - Autumn Nightfall in my Place in the Hills
  - Zhongnan Retreat
  - Living in the Hills: Impromptu Verses
  - Lament for Lin Yao
  - Ballad of the Peach Tree Spring
- Li Bai
  - In the Quiet Night
  - A Song of Qui-pu
  - The Waterfall at Lu Shan
  - Question and Answer in the Mountains
  - Seeing Meng Hoaran off to Yagzhou
  - Listening to a Monk from Shu Playing the Lute
  - The Mighty Eunuchs' Carriages
  - Drinking Alone with the Moon
  - Bring in the Wine
  - The Road to Shu is Hard
- Du Fu
  - Thoughts while Travelling at Night
  - Spring Scene in Time of War
  - Moonlit Night
  - The Visitor
  - Thoughts on an Ancient Site: The Temple of Zhu-ge Liang
  - The Chancellor of Shu
  - An Autumn Meditation
  - Dreaming of Li Bai
  - To Wei Ba, who has Lived Away from the Court
  - The Old Cypress Tree at the Temple of Zhu-ge Liang
  - A Fine Lady
  - Grieving for the Young Prince
  - Ballad of the Army Carts
