= The Humble Administrator's Garden =

1985 book by Vikram Seth

- The Humble Administrator's Garden first edition cover.
- Author: Vikram Seth
- Cover artist: Stephen Raw
- Language: English
- Genre: Poetry
- Publisher: Carcanet Press Ltd.
- Publication date: 1985
- Publication place: United Kingdom
- Media type: Print
- Pages: 62 pp
- ISBN: 0-85635-583-6
- OCLC: 60051986
- LC Class: MLCS 89/19156 (P)

The Humble Administrator's Garden is a collection of poetry written by Vikram Seth. It is his first collection, published in 1985 by Carcanet.

== Sections ==
The book has three sections, each containing works on a geography of Seth's life. The first section, titled Wutong, is inspired by his years of study and travel in China. Neem, the second section, has poems with themes from his native India, and the last is Live-Oak, with California-based topics.

== Contents ==
- Wutong
  - A Little Night Music
  - The Master-of-Nets Garden
  - The Humble Administrator's Garden
  - The North Temple Tower
  - The Gentle Waves Pavilion
  - The Tarrying Garden
  - The Great Confucian Temple, Suzhou
  - Nanjing Night
  - Evening Wheat
  - The Accountant's House
  - Research in Jiangsu Province
  - From a Traveller
  - A Little Distance
  - A Hangzhou Garden
  - From an "East is Red" Steamer
- Neem
  - Profiting
  - The They
  - The Comfortable Classes at Work and Play
  - The Gift
  - Homeless
  - From the BaburNama: Memoirs of Babur, First Moghul Emperor of India
- Live-Oak
  - Curious Mishaps
  - Song: "Coast Starlight"
  - From California
  - Song: "Waiting"
  - Between Storms
  - And Some Have Madness Thrust Upon Them
  - Spring of Content
  - Moonlight
  - Abalone Soup
  - Love and Work
  - Ceasing upon the Midnight
  - Unclaimed
