= All You Who Sleep Tonight =

- Author: Vikram Seth
- Language: English
- Genre: poetry
- Publisher: Vintage
- Publication date: June 18, 1991
- Pages: 61 pages
- ISBN: 9780679730255

All You Who Sleep Tonight is a 1990 collection of poems by Vikram Seth.

British composer Jonathan Dove set eight of the quatrains and five other poems to music for Nuala Willis in a 1996 song cycle of the same name.

== Contents ==
The collection is grouped into five sections:

- Romantic Residues, poems which reflect on feelings of love and their effects, or after-effects
- In Other Voices, poems from the viewpoint of people in other times and places, such as a doctor in Hiroshima on the day of the atomic bomb
- In Other Places, poems about places and people encountered in his travels
- Quatrains, four-line poems on themes as diverse as insomnia and table manners
- Meditations of the Heart, ranging from admiration of the Russian dissident poet Irina Ratushinskaya to the title poem of the volume.

A selection of the poems has been set by British composer Jonathan Dove, and recorded on an award-winning CD for the Naxos label by mezzo-soprano Patricia Bardon and pianist Andrew Matthews-Owen.

== Title Poem ==
All You Who Sleep Tonight
All you who sleep tonight
Far from the ones you love,
No hand to left or right
And emptiness above—

Know that you aren't alone.
The whole world shares your tears,
Some for two nights or one,
And some for all their years.
