= A Suitable Girl (novel) =

Novel by Vikram Seth

- Author: Vikram Seth
- Language: English
- Publisher: Weidenfeld & Nicolson
- Publication date: Unannounced
- Publication place: India
- ISBN: 978-1780227887

A Suitable Girl is an upcoming novel by Vikram Seth that is a sequel to his 1993 book A Suitable Boy. Seth has said the book will be set in the present, rather than in 1952 when A Suitable Boy finished, and will therefore be what Seth calls a "jump sequel". The book was announced in 2009 but has yet to be completed.

After Seth missed a deadline to submit the manuscript to Penguin Publisher in June 2013, it was announced that the new novel would be published in autumn of 2016 by Orion Publishers, which had published A Suitable Boy. In May 2015, it was reported that Seth was hoping to finish writing the book in 2016, for publication in 2017. Seth explained that he had missed the Penguin deadline due to suffering from writer's block as a result of the failure of a romantic relationship. As of 2023 the novel was still unfinished though Seth confirmed in a 2018 interview that he was still working on the book as well as more material in the A Suitable Boy universe to be collectively called A Bridge of Leaves.
