= The Hare and the Hedgehog =

Well-known German fairy tale recorded by the Brothers Grimm in 1843

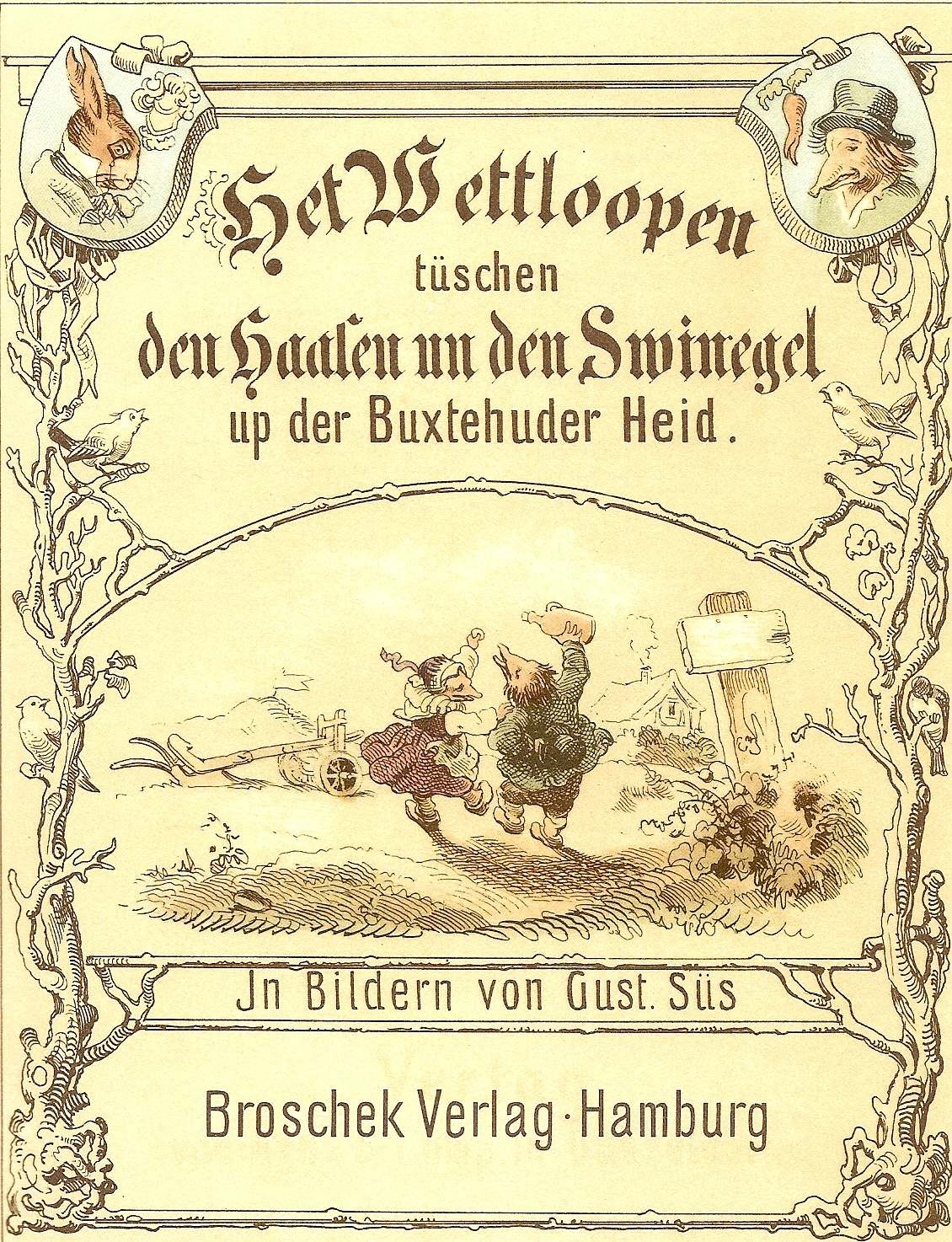
- Cover of a low-saxon edition published 1855 with illustrations by Gustav Süs.

Folk tale
- Name: The Hare and the Hedgehog
- Region: Germany
- Published in: Kinder- und Hausmärchen, by the Brothers Grimm

"The Hare and the Hedgehog" or "The race between the Hare and the Hedgehog" (Low Saxon: Dat Wettlopen twischen den Hasen un den Swinegel up de lütje Heide bi Buxtehude; German: Der Hase und der Igel) is a Low Saxon fable. It was published 1843 in the 5th edition of Grimms' Fairy Tales by the Brothers Grimm in Low Saxon (KHM 187) and in 1840 in Wilhelm Schröder's Hannoversches Volksblatt under the full title Ein plattdeutsches Volksmärchen. Dat Wettlopen twischen den Hasen un den Swinegel up de lütje Heide bi Buxtehude. Ludwig Bechstein also published it in German in his Deutsches Märchenbuch (1853).

== Synopsis ==
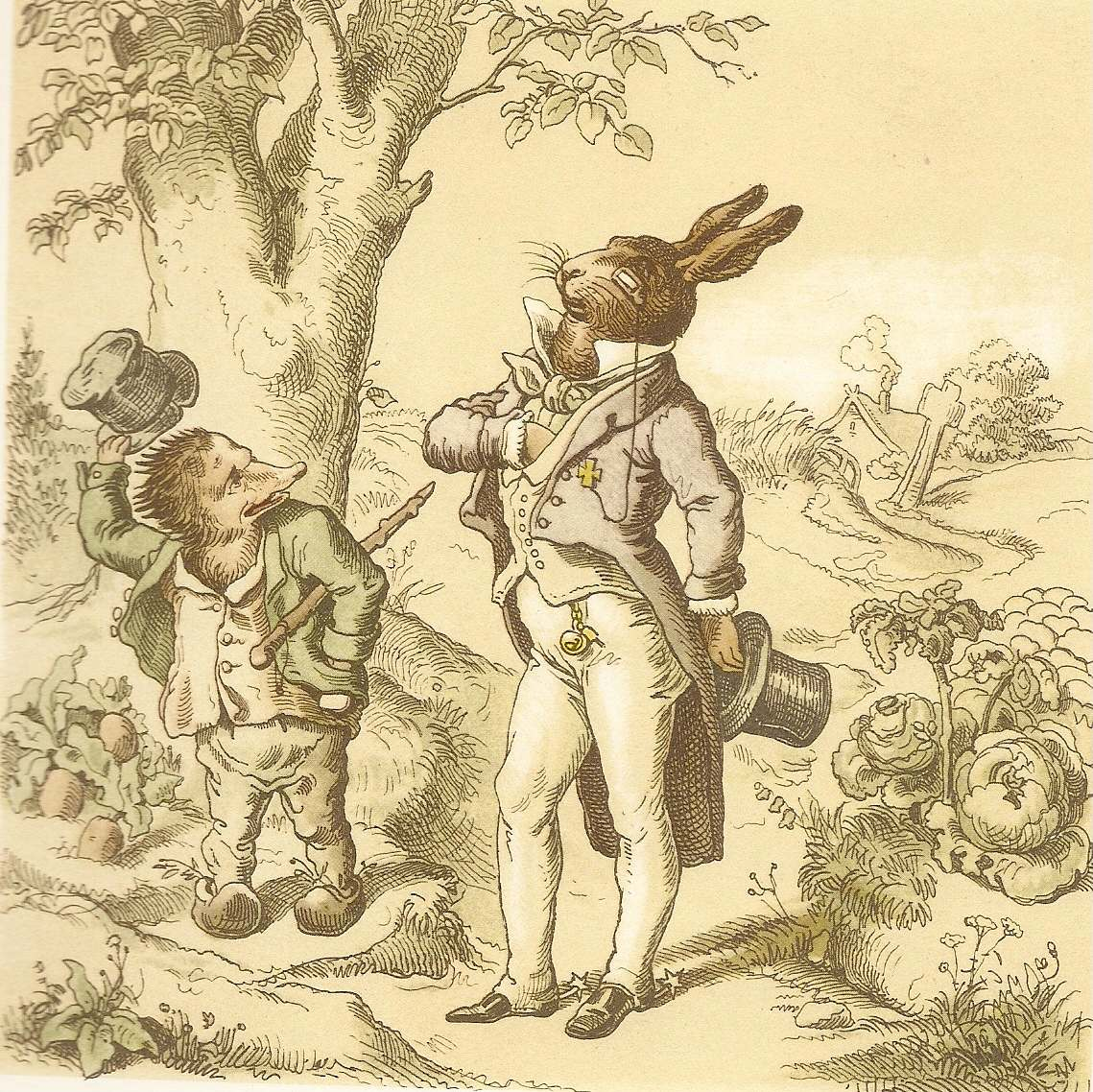
"Go'n Morgen"

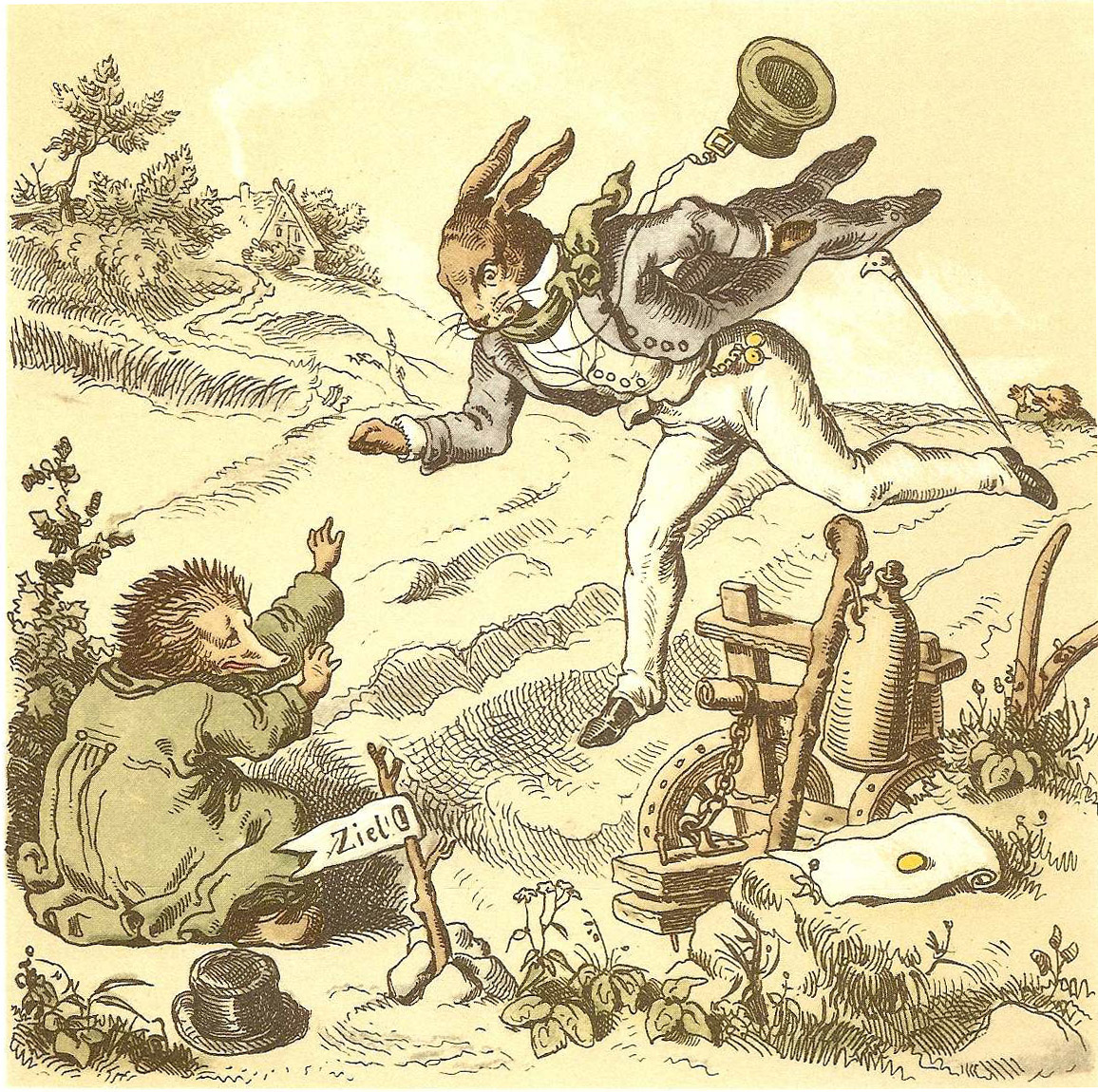
"Ick bün all hier"

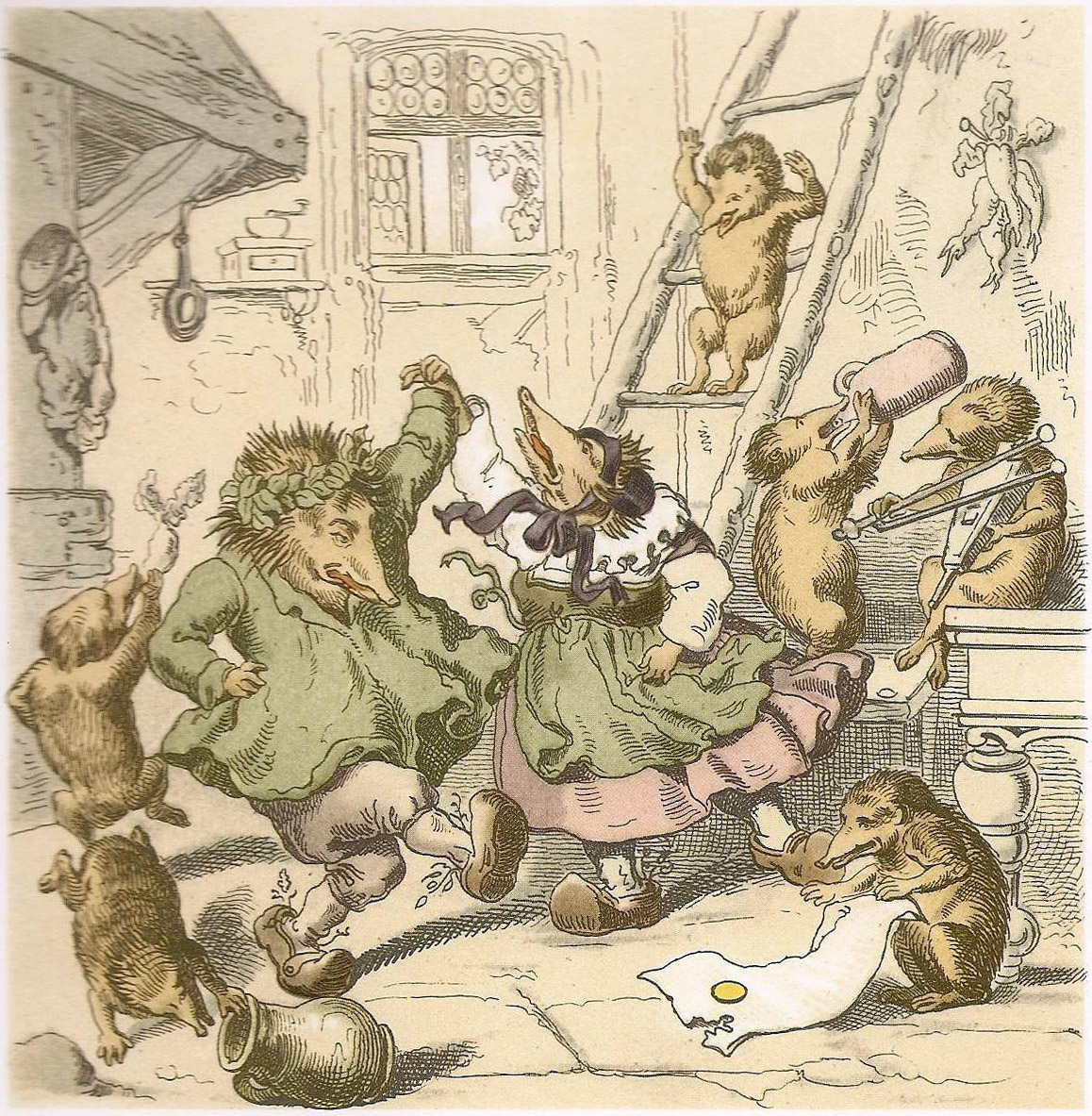
"…un wenn se nich storben sünd, lewt se noch"

One fine morning, the hare makes fun of the hedgehog's crooked legs, whereupon the hedgehog challenges him to a race to win a golden "Lujedor" (Louis d'or) and a bottle of brandy.

When the race in the field begins, the hedgehog only runs a few steps, but at the end of the furrow he has placed his wife, who looks very much like him. When the hare, certain of victory, storms in, the hedgehog's wife rises and calls out to him: "Ick bün all hier!" ("I'm already here!").

The hare cannot understand the defeat, he demands revenge and conducts a total of 73 runs with always the same result. In the 74th race he collapses exhausted and dies.

== Style ==
The narrator begins mischievously, saying that the story is "to be told lying", but his grandfather has said that it must be true, otherwise one could not tell it ("Wahr mutt se doch sein, mien Söhn, anners kunn man se jo nich vertellen"), and tells comfortably how the "Swinegel" sings a song in the morning wind and looks for the turnips. The hare's remark about his legs annoys him, because they are so by nature. The moral is not to make fun of an ordinary man and marry someone who looks the same.

== Remarks ==
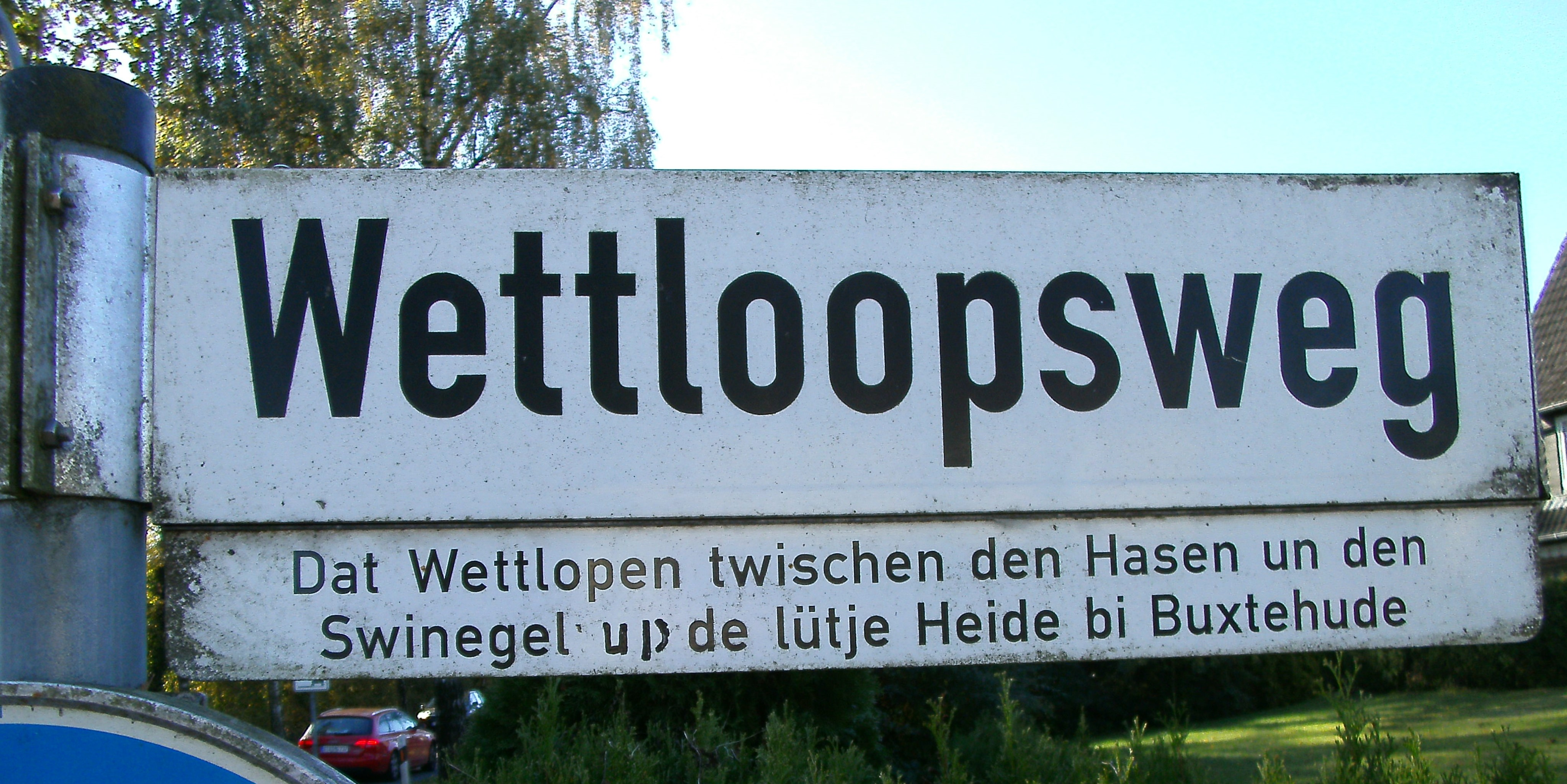
Streetsign „Wettloopsweg“ in Buxtehude

The setting on the Buxtehude Heath is Schröder's idea. Originally, he had heard the fairy tale in Bexhövede, which is about 70 kilometers away from Buxtehude near Bremerhaven. Schröder's reasons for relocating the action are not known with certainty. The term Schweinigel or Swienegel in Low German is a common term for the hedgehog, not a pejorative one.

The statement "in the area of Osnabrück" can be traced to an error by Wilhelm Grimm.

Unusual for a fairy tale is the self-ironic introduction: "Disse Geschicht is lögenhaft to vertellen, Jungens, aver wahr is se doch! Denn mien Grootvader, van den ick se hew, plegg jümmer, wenn he se mi vörtüerde, dabi to seggen: ‚Wahr mutt se doch sien, mien Söhn, anners kunn man se jo nich vertellen!" ("This story is a lie to tell, boy, but it is true, because my grandfather, who gave it to me, used to say when he told it to me: 'It must be true, my boy, otherwise you couldn't tell it.").

== Backgrounds ==
The hedgehog is the "common man" who used to eat the turnips near his house, therefore he considered them his own. The hare, on the other hand, is a distinguished gentleman and cruelly lofty to boot. The protagonists thus play the role of a farmer and a landowner. The two moral conclusions are also aimed at this social background; for the hare: One should not make fun of supposedly inferior people - and for the hedgehog: When you marry, you should choose a woman from your own class, preferably one with a similar mentality to yourself: "So if you are a Swinegel, you should be glad that your wife is also a Swinegel".

== Origin ==
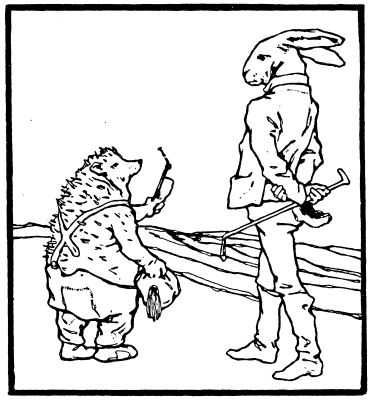
Illustration by Otto Ubbelohde, 1909

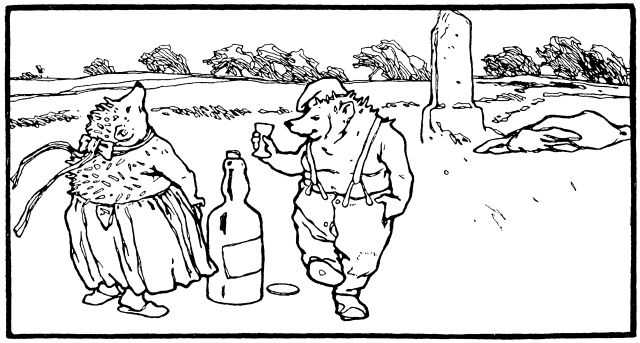
Illustration by Otto Ubbelohde, 1909

Grimm's text follows exactly the one in the Hannoversches Volksblatt No. 51 of April 26, 1840, a copy of which Karl Georg Firnhaber made available to them in November 1840. Only a few spellings of the dialect were changed or provided with a translation in brackets. Only the title is now High German and short.

Even ancient tales know fables about the race between slow and fast animals. One example is Aesop's The Tortoise and the Hare. According to Lutz Röhrich, in Africa the turtle outsmarts the elephant in a very similar way.

== Reception ==
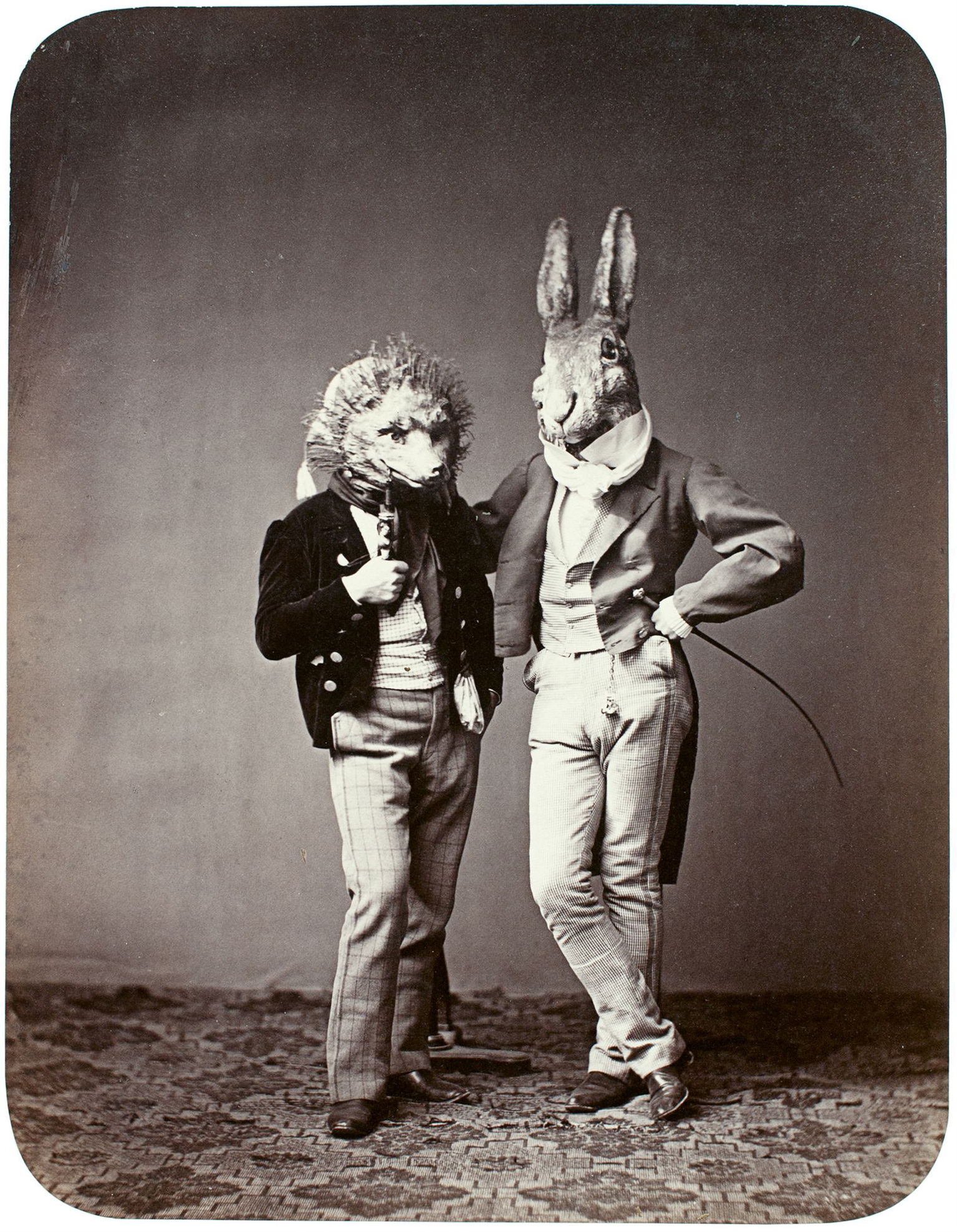
Participants at a fairy tale ball, depicting the race of the hedgehog and the hare (Joseph Albert, Munich, 1862)

The situation "hare and hedgehog" as well as the shout "I am already here!" became proverbial in Germany and are still quoted in comparable situations today. Usually the perspective of the "rabbit" is described, which, when repeatedly confronted with the same competitor, always comes to the same frustrating result. Obviously, the image is used in sports, but also in business and politics.

== Adaptations ==
Günter Grass wrote a short story of the same name.

Fredrik Vahle sings the song of the rabbit Augustin on his children's song record Die Rübe, which was released in 1973. The second part is a musical version of the fairy tale of the hare and the hedgehog. The story is similar to the fairy tale, but somewhat shortened.

The Hare and Tortoise is a board game invented in 1973 by the Englishman David Parlett which was the first game to be awarded the German Game of the Year prize in 1979 under the name Hase und Igel. The original English title Hare and Tortoise refers to Aesop's fable.

A Movie Der Wettlauf zwischen dem Hasen und dem Igel was released in 1921 based on a script by Johannes Meyer.

Der Hase und der Igel is a German fairy tale movie from 1982.

Grimm's Fairy Tale Classics, a Japanese anime series from 1987, tells the story of the race between the hare and the hedgehog in episode 41 with the Hare voiced by Robert Axelrod in the English dub and the Hedgehog voiced by Steve Kramer in the English dub.

It also adopted in Slovakia for their Vecernicek called Sedem výmyselných budíkov for their episode called Skoré a neskoré jablká featuring the hare and hedgehog.

== Literature ==
- Heinz Rölleke (Hrsg.): Grimms Märchen und ihre Quellen. Die literarischen Vorlagen der Grimmschen Märchen synoptisch vorgestellt und kommentiert (= Schriftenreihe Literaturwissenschaft. Band 35). 2. Auflage. Wissenschaftlicher Verlag Trier, Trier 2004, ISBN 3-88476-717-8, S. 454–461, 579–580.
- Hans-Jörg Uther: Handbuch zu den Kinder- und Hausmärchen der Brüder Grimm. de Gruyter, Berlin 2008, ISBN 978-3-11-019441-8, S. 384–386.
