= There's many a slip 'twixt the cup and the lip =

English proverb

"There's many a slip 'twixt the cup and the lip" is an English proverb. It implies that even when a good outcome or conclusion seems certain, things can still go wrong, similar in meaning to "don't count your chickens before they hatch". It also refers to truths or lies spoken by a drinker, as in "there's many a slip of the tongue that occurs whilst drinking."

The modern proverb dates to the late 18th century, with English-language predecessors dating back to the 16th century, based on Latin and Greek templates reaching back to at least the 2nd century.

== Origin ==
There is a reference to the many things that can intervene between cup and lip already in an iambic verse by Lycophron (3rd century BC). Erasmus noted in his Adagia that the Greek and Latin versions of the proverb had been recorded by the Carthaginian grammarian Sulpicius Apollinaris (fl. 2nd century C.E.), as quoted in Aulus Gellius's Attic Nights: "πολλὰ μεταξὺ πέλει κύλικος καὶ χείλεος ἄκρου" ("much takes place between the (wine) cup and the upper lip") and "multa cadunt inter calicem supremaque labra" ("many things fall between the chalice, and the upper lips").

There is a slight similarity between the wording of the proverb and that of an unattributed Greek iambic trimeter verse quoted by Cicero in one of his letters Ad Atticum (51 BC), but here refers to the geographical distance between Cicero and his correspondent.

The Greek verse is attributed to Palladas in The Greek Anthology (X, 32), but that is manifestly erroneous, since Palladas lived in the 4th century, two centuries after Aulus Gellius. The Loeb Classical Library edition of the Anthology says that the verse is "a very ancient proverb, by some attributed to Homer".

The Greek proverb is mentioned in a scholium on the Argonautica. In this account, the verse was a comment by a seer who told Ancaeus, who was setting out on the perilous enterprise of the Argonauts, that he would never taste wine from his newly planted vineyard. On his safe return, Ancaeus filled a cup with the first wine from his vineyard and reproached the seer for what appeared to be a false prophecy. The seer responded with the verse and just then an alarm was raised that a wild boar was destroying the vineyard. Without tasting the wine, Ancaeus rushed out and was killed by the boar. Hence, the prophecy came to be true.

The proverb is referenced in the anonymous 13th-century French work De l'oue au chapelain,

The Latin proverb is quoted in Robert Burton's The Anatomy of Melancholy (1621).

== English proverb ==
An English translation of Erasmus's 1523 work by Richard Taverner in 1539 rendered the proverb as "Many thynges fall betwene the cuppe and the mouth ... Betwene the cuppe and the lyppes maye come many casualties".

The proverb appears in English also in William Lambarde's A Perambulation of Kent in 1576: "[M]any things happen (according to the proverbe) betweene the Cup and the Lippe". In the same year, George Pettie added to it: "Many things (as the saying is) happens betweene the cup and the lip, many thinges chaunce betweene the bourde and the bed" in Petite Palace. The version "many thinges fall betweene the cup and the lip" appears in 1580 in John Lyly's Euphues and His England. In Ben Jonson's play, A Tale of a Tub (1633) the Latin proverb is partly mentioned, then explained: "But thus you see th' old Adage verified, / Multa cadunt inter—you can guess the reſt. / Many things fall between the Cup and Lip: / And though they touch, you are not sure to drink."

The Macmillan Book of Proverbs erroneously states that Miguel de Cervantes referenced the proverb in Don Quixote in 1605. However, although some English translations use the proverb, what is in the original text is a different, though similar, proverb: "Del dicho al hecho hay gran trecho" (More easily said than done).

The modern form of the English proverb where the word slip is used to rhyme with lip developed in the late 18th and early 19th century. For example, an early record is in Catharine Maria Sedgwick's The Linwoods: or, "Sixty Years Since" in America (1835), in the form "there is many a slip between the cup and the lip". The proverb is also alluded to in the voice of one of the characters earlier in the novel – the leader of a group of banditti drops a bottle of brandy while ransacking a house; it shatters and he says, "Ah, my men! there's a sign for us—we may have a worse slip than that ''tween the cup and the lip:' so let's be off— [...]".

Subsequently, "there is many a slip 'tween the cup and the lip" appears in David Macbeth Moir's The Life of Mansie Wauch (new edition, 1839). The variant reading using 'twixt in place of 'tween is recorded in 1828: "There's many a slip 'twixt the cup and the lip." James F. O'Connell (1836) has "many a slip 'twixt cup and lip", while R. H. Barham's The Ingoldsby Legends: Lady Rohesia (1840) has "There is many a slip 'twixt the cup and the lip".

The proverb became very popular from the 1840s onward and throughout the later 19th century. Slight variants in wording persist into current usage; this concerns mainly alteration between 'twixt, betwixt, 'tween and between on one hand, and optional use of the definite articles, the cup and the lip vs. cup and lip, on the other. From the earliest days of its popularity, the proverb was often described as old and somewhat trite. One of the earliest attestations of its modern form, in 1835, already describe it as "somewhat musty". The Encyclopædia Americana of 1847 cites it as an example for the triteness of proverbs in general: "a public speaker could not use the proverb "'Twixt cup and lip is many a slip," at least, not without some apology for its triteness".

== Usage since 1850 ==
- 1850: The proverb is used in William Makepeace Thackeray's Pendennis.
- 1855–1867: The phrase appears numerous times in the Chronicles of Barsetshire series (1855–1867) by Anthony Trollope, especially in connection with the engagement of Lily Dale to Adolphus Crosbie in The Small House at Allington (1862–1864) and the engagement of Grace Crawley to Major Grantly in The Last Chronicle of Barset (1867).
- 1864: "The Cup and the Lip" is the title of the first of four books of Our Mutual Friend (1864–1865) by Charles Dickens.
- 1883: The phrase was used by the author Howard Pyle in his novel The Merry Adventures of Robin Hood when Robin is attempting to return to Sherwood Forest while being pursued by King Henry's men.
- 1905: "Many a slip 'twixt the cup and the lip" is said in Natsume Sōseki's 吾輩は猫である (wagahai wa neko de aru, I Am a Cat) by Mr. Sneaze (苦沙彌, kushami, sneeze), recounting a story about his wife not understanding English.
- 1965: The phrase: "There's many a slip betwixt the cup and the lip" is spoken by the fictional character Eliot Rosewater in the Kurt Vonnegut, Jr. novel "Godbless You, Mr. Rosewater."
- 1967: The American pop group The Present recorded a song called "Many's the Slip Twixt the Cup and the Lip (or Baby the World Really Turns)" in 1967. The song, written by George Fischoff and Tony Powers, was released as a single on the Philips label but failed to chart.
- 1981: In Mario Vargas Llosa’s novel The War of the End of the World, the proverb is said by a war correspondent as the army begins its offensive on Canudos.
- 1988: The proverb is said by Emilio Estevez as Billy the Kid in the film Young Guns.
- An allusion to the proverb is anecdotally attributed to Willard Van Orman Quine (1908–2000), in the form "There is many a slip betwixt subjective cup and objective lip."
- 2025: Landman Season 2 Episode 5
