= Albertype =

Photographic process

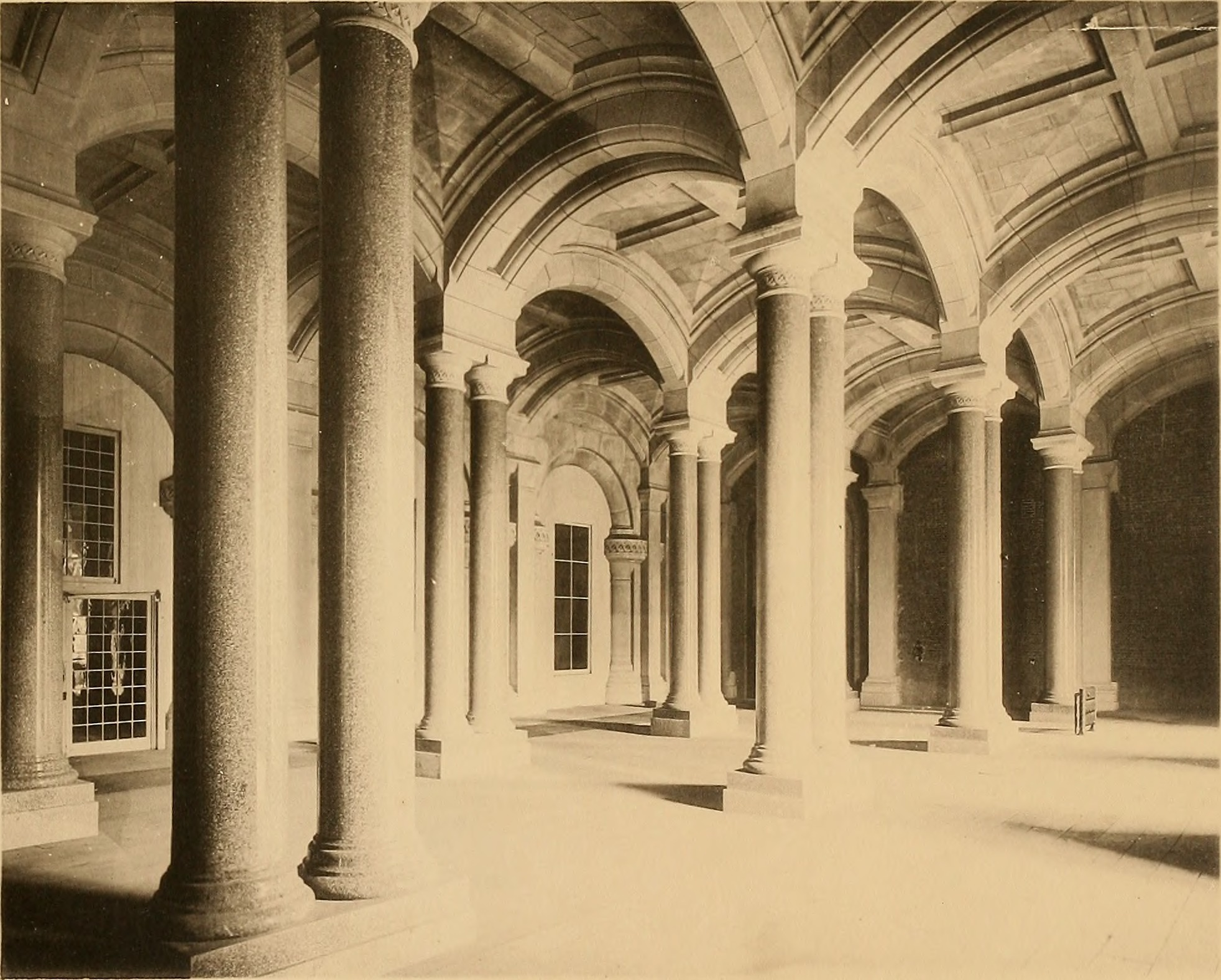
A print made using the Albertype process

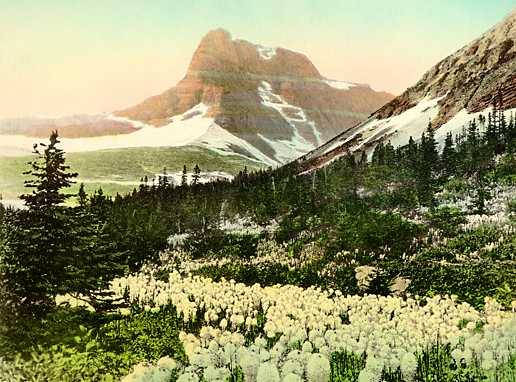
1920 hand-colored Albertype of Glacier National Park in the United States

An Albertype is a picture printed from a type of gelatine-coated plate produced by means of a photographic negative. The process was invented by Josef Albert, a German photographer who owned and directed a studio and photo lab in Augsburg, Germany.

The technique is similar to collotype, but substitutes the gel plate for the lithographic stone used in collotype. Heliotype, invented in 1871 by Edwards, is another similar process.

Albert's innovation was to replace the copper or stone with glass, construct a mechanical press, and cover it with another gel layer, silicate mixed with gelatin, in order to produce about two thousand prints from each plate using etching presses and hand rollers. This new process was presented at the 1868 Photographic Exhibition in Hamburg and "albertype" was the name given by Joseph Albert. This technique was adopted by publishers creating thousands of postcards and viewbooks.

In 1890, Adolph and Herman L. Wittemann founded the Albertype Company, a postcard and viewbook publishing company in Brooklyn, New York City. This company began to use what were then "new technologies" such as the albertype to reproduce photo-mechanical images. At that time they were able to collect negatives from the cities and towns of the United States and came to create more than 25,000 prints from 1890 to 1952.
