= Vikram Seth =

Indian novelist and poet (born 1952)

Vikram Seth CBE FRSL
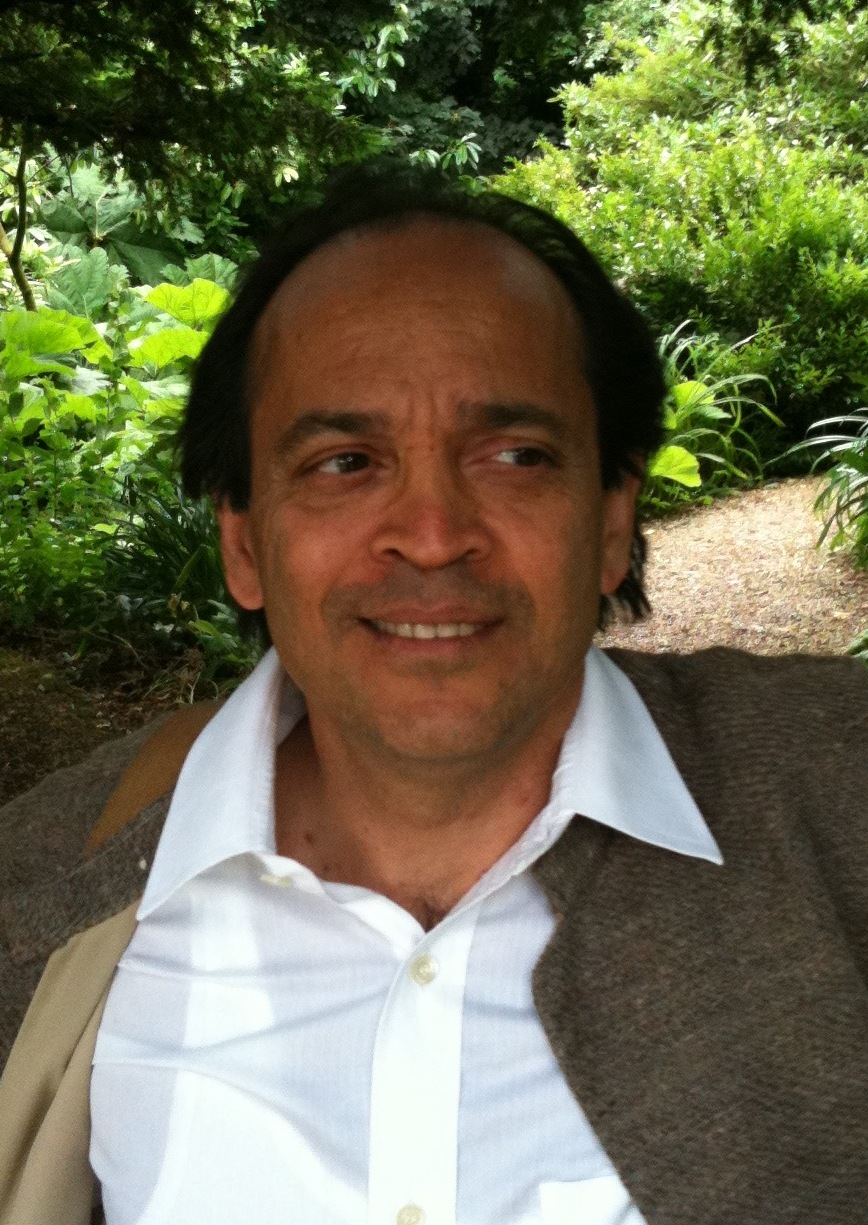
- Seth in 2009
- Born: 20 June 1952 (age 74); Calcutta, West Bengal, India
- Education: Corpus Christi College, Oxford; Stanford University
- Occupations: Novelist; poet
- Writing career
- Period: 1980–present
- Genres: Novels, poetry, libretto, travel writing, children's literature, biography/memoir
- Notable works: A Suitable Boy; The Golden Gate; An Equal Music
- Notable awards: Padma Shri; Sahitya Akademi Award; Stegner Fellowship; Guggenheim Fellowship; FRSL; Commonwealth Writers' Prize
- Vikram Seth's voice from the BBC programme Desert Island Discs, 22 January 2012.
- Website: www.vikramseth.net

Vikram Seth (born 20 June 1952) is an Indian novelist and poet. The author of three novels and several collections of poetry, he is a recipient of the Padma Shri, a Sahitya Akademi Award, the Pravasi Bharatiya Samman, the WH Smith Literary Award and the Crossword Book Award. Seth's collections of poetry such as Mappings and Beastly Tales are notable contributions to the Indian English language poetry canon.

== Early life ==
Seth was born on 20 June 1952 in Calcutta. His father, Prem Nath Seth, was an executive of Bata Shoes and his mother, Leila Seth, a Barrister by training, became the first female judge of the Delhi High Court and first woman to become Chief justice of a state High Court in India.

Seth was educated at the all-boys' private boarding school The Doon School in Dehradun, where he was editor-in-chief of The Doon School Weekly. At Doon, he was influenced by his teacher, the mountaineer Gurdial Singh, who taught him geography and according to Leila Seth, "guided Vikram in many ways...encouraged him to appreciate Western classical music and instilled in him a love of adventure and daring." Singh later described Seth as an "indefatigable worker, and he maintains without difficulty his distinguished level in studies...he has put in an enormous amount of energy in other spheres of school life, in dramatics, in debating, in first aid, in music, and in editing the Doon School Weekly." After graduating from Doon, Seth went to Tonbridge School, England, to complete his A-levels. Later he read Philosophy, Politics and Economics at Corpus Christi College, Oxford. He then pursued a PhD in Economics at Stanford University, though he never completed it.

== Views ==
Seth commented on the Indian general elections held during the summer of 2024 saying that "we live in a better situation now than we lived a month ago". He made this comment less than a month after the elections were over and a new coalition government had been sworn in. Seth said "at least now there is somewhat of limitation on autocracy."

On the recent sanction to prosecute the author Arundhati Roy, he noted that it was "craziness."

== Personal life ==
Seth is bisexual. He was in a relationship with the violinist Philippe Honoré for ten years and dedicated his novel An Equal Music to him. In 2006, he became a leader of the campaign against Section 377 of the Indian Penal Code, a law against homosexuality. When Section 377 was reinstated in 2013, Seth continued campaigning against the law.

Seth divides his time between the United Kingdom, where he bought and renovated the former home of the Anglican poet George Herbert near Salisbury, and India, where he has a family home in Noida, Uttar Pradesh.

== Works ==
=== Novels ===
- The Golden Gate (1986)
- A Suitable Boy (1993)
- An Equal Music (1999)
- A Suitable Girl (planned)

=== Poetry ===
- Mappings (1980)
- The Tale of Melon City (1981)
- The Humble Administrator's Garden (1985)
- All You Who Sleep Tonight (1990)
- Beastly Tales (1992)
- Three Chinese Poets (1992)
- The Frog and the Nightingale (1994)
- Summer Requiem: A Book of Poems (2015)
- A Doctor's Journal Entry for 6 August 1945
- Elephant and the Trapogan

=== Translation ===
Hanuman Chalisa

=== Children's fiction ===
- Arion and the Dolphin (1994)
- The Louse and the Mosquito (2020)

=== Non-fiction ===
- From Heaven Lake: Travels Through Sinkiang and Tibet (1983)
- Two Lives (2005)
- The Rivered Earth (2011)

=== Appearances in poetry anthologies ===
- The Oxford India Anthology of Twelve Modern Indian Poets. Ed. Arvind Krishna Mehrotra. New Delhi: Oxford University Press, 1992.
- The Golden Treasure of Writers Workshop Poetry. Ed. Rubana Huq. Calcutta: Writers Workshop, 2008.

== Awards and honours ==
- 1983 – Thomas Cook Travel Book Award for From Heaven Lake: Travels Through Sinkiang and Tibet
- 1985 – Commonwealth Poetry Prize (Asia) for The Humble Administrator's Garden
- 1988 – Sahitya Akademi Award for The Golden Gate
- 1993 – Shortlisted, Irish Times International Fiction Prize for A Suitable Boy
- 1994 – Commonwealth Writers Prize (Overall Winner, Best Book) for A Suitable Boy
- 1994 – WH Smith Literary Award for A Suitable Boy
- 1994 – Elected Fellow of the Royal Society of Literature
- 1999 – Crossword Book Award for An Equal Music
- 2001 – Commander of the Order of the British Empire
- 2001 – EMMA (BT Ethnic and Multicultural Media Award) for Best Book/Novel for An Equal Music
- 2005 – Pravasi Bharatiya Samman
- 2007 – Padma Shri in Literature & Education
- 2013 – NDTV's 25 Greatest Global Living Legends In India

== See also ==
- List of Indian writers
- List of trustees of the British Museum

== Sources ==
- Chaudhuri, Amit (ed.). "Vikram Seth (born 1952)." The Vintage Book of Modern Indian Literature. New York: Vintage, 2004:508–537.
