= Beastly Tales =

1991 collection of ten fables in poetry

Beastly Tales from Here and There
- First Indian edition (publ Viking)
- Author: Vikram Seth
- Publication date: January 1, 1992
- ISBN: 978-0-7538-1034-7 UK edition

Beastly Tales from Here and There is a 1992 collection of ten fables in poetry written by Vikram Seth. In the introduction, Seth states,"The first two come from India, the next two from China, the next two from Greece, the next two from Ukraine. The final two came directly to me from the Land of Gup."

== Contents ==
1. The Crocodile and the Monkey
2. The Louse and the Mosquito
3. The Mouse and the Snake
4. The Rat and the Ox
5. The Eagle and the Beetle
6. The Hare and the Tortoise
7. The Cat and the Cock
8. The Goat and the Ram
9. The Frog and the Nightingale
10. The Elephant and the Tragopan

== Poems ==
"The Tortoise and the Hare" depicts Seth's sense of humour. In his version, the loser, being a celebrity, is feted and the winner ignored.

"The Frog and the Nightingale" is a fable about a nightingale who gets singing lessons from a frog while the frog tries to commercialize her voice.

== Adaptions ==
Poems from the book have been performed by Naseeruddin Shah, Ratna Pathak, Heeba Shah, and Kenneth Desai.
