= God's Mischief =

1989 novel by M. Mukundan

daivathinte Vikrtikal (english edition)
- Author: M. Mukundan
- Original title: Daivathinte Vikrithikal
- Translator: Prema Jayakumar
- Language: Malayalam
- Genre: Novel
- Publisher: Penguin Books India, DC Books
- Publication date: 13 December 1989
- Publication place: India
- English publication date: 30 October 2002
- Pages: 254
- Awards: Kendra Sahitya Akademi Award; N. V. Prize

God's Mischief (Malayalam: ദൈവത്തിന്റെ വികൃതികള്‍, Daivathinte Vikrithikal) is a 1989 Malayalam novel written by M. Mukundan. Like most of Mukundan's works, this novel too is based in Mayyazhi, better known once as Mahé, the French colony after it was decolonised. The story centres on a magician, Father Alfonse, his daughter, Elsee and an Ayurveda Vaidyar Kumaran and his two twin sons and how their life changes after the land is decolonised. The novel won the Sahitya Akademi Award and the N. V. Prize. It was adapted into a film by noted director Lenin Rajendran in 1992.

== Plot summary ==
The story begins in 1950s, when the French, the colonial rulers were packing off from Mahé, a coastal town in North Malabar, after 230 years, leaving behind remnants of a cultural history. Those, who considered themselves as belonging to Francophone culture, jumped onto the first available vessel to France. And many of the older generation, orphaned by the departure of the French, struggle to eke out a living even as they remember their days of plenty under their foreign masters. Caught up in their suffering, Kumaran Vaidyar does everything he can to keep the people of his beloved Mayyazhi from starving, but entrusts his own children to the care of his wife, who is no more. Meanwhile, Father Alphonse waves his magic wand and changes pebbles into candy and waits for his good-looking son to return. Through all this, untroubled by the woes of the elders, Shivan, Shashi and Elsie spend an idyllic childhood in sunny, sleepy Mayyazhi. Until the day of reckoning catches up with them and they pay the price of growing up.

== Translation ==
The English translation of the book by Prema Jayakumar was released by Penguin Books India on 30 October 2013. India Today wrote: "The translation is brilliant, losing none of the linguistic subtleties of prose and colour of the original Malayalam. The translator has ensured that the delicacy of interlocking relationships, situations and their nuances have been preserved in all their complexity as the book tsunamis towards its climax." A Bengali translation is also available published by Sahitya Academy translated by Basabi Chakrabarty - 'ভগবানের দুষ্টুমি'

== Film adaptation ==
In 1992, a film adaptation of the novel was released, starring Raghuvaran as Alfonso, Rajan P. Dev as Arupurayil Kadungun, Thilakan as Kumaran Vysyar, Srividya as Maggi, Malavika Avinash as Elsee, Vineeth as Sasi, Sudheesh as Sivan and directed by Lenin Rajendran. Mukundan assisted with writing the screenplay and with other production tasks. The film was critically well acclaimed and won the Kerala State Film Award for Best Film.

== See also ==
- Delhi Gathakal
- Mayyazhippuzhayude Theerangalil
