= Bhushita Vasistha =

Nepali writer (born 1990)

- भूषिता वशिष्ठ
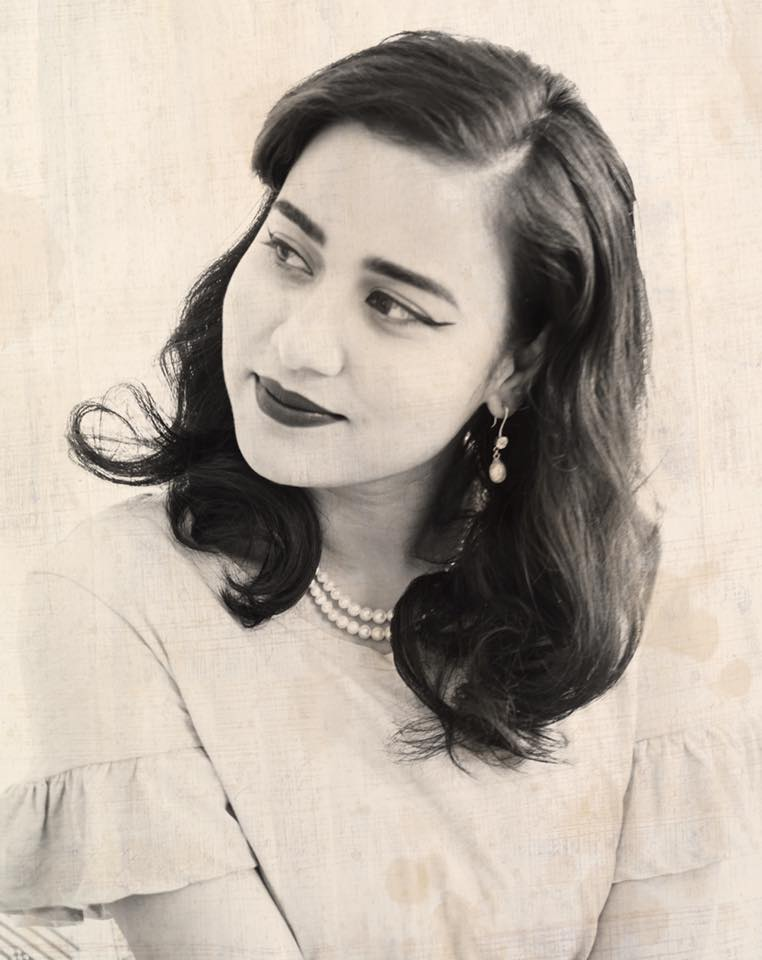
- Bhushita shooting for Beni Waiba in 2019 in Kathmandu
- Born: Bhushita Bhattarai; Diktel, Khotang District, Nepal
- Education: Tribhuvan University; San Jose State University
- Occupations: Writer, editor, journalist, poet, performer
- Notable work: Bathtub (Play) (2019)
- Parents: Bharat Sernali (Father); Bhagawati Bhattarai (Mother)
- Awards: Fulbright Scholar 2022
- Website: www.tumblr.com/bhushita

Bhushita Vasistha (Nepali: भूषिता वशिष्ठ; born Bhushita Bhattarai, 1990) is a Nepali writer, editor, literary historian, poet, journalist, and performer. She is a Fulbright Scholar and holds an MFA in Creative Writing from San José State University.

== Career ==
Vasistha began her journalism career as a stringer for The Kathmandu Post, one of Nepal's leading English-language daily newspapers, in 2005. She has contributed to literary journals including River Teeth , Mithila Review,The Reed Magazine, and Clay. She has served as fiction editor at Reed Magazine and as copy chief at Nepalaya Publication in Kathmandu. Her writings, talks, and performances engage with literature, feminism, and Sanskrit poetics.

In 2025, she delivered a lecture on South Asian postcolonialism at the SAARC Cultural Centre and has been a speaker at literary festivals including the Janakpur Literature Festival, Nepal Literature Festival, and Kalinga Literary Festival. She also took part in the joint launch of Chuden Kabimo's novel Faatsung.

== Performance and media ==
She is recognized for performing traditional Nepali Chhanda poetry at events, including the Paleti musical series in Kathmandu. She acted in the play Bathtub by Kumar Nagarkoti. The play was listed as one of the top five plays of the year 2019 by Republica.

She has hosted the Nepalaya Book Talk Show, which featured conversations with authors and cultural figures such as Ani Choying Drolma, Kumar Nagarkoti, Nayan Raj Pandey, and Narayan Wagle. She has appeared on television talk shows both as a guest and as a host. Some other notable personalities she has interviewed include Rajesh Hamal , and Dzongsar Jamyang Khyentse Rinpoche.

== See also ==
- Ani Choying Drolma
- Kumar Nagarkoti
- Chuden Kabimo
- Nayan Raj Pandey
- Narayan Wagle
- Dzongsar Jamyang Khyentse Rinpoche
