= Nemat Khana =

2022 book by Khalid Jawed

- Author: Khalid Jawed
- Original title: نعمت خانہ
- Language: Urdu
- Publisher: Arshia
- Publication place: India

Nemat Khana (Urdu: نعمت خانہ, Hindi: नेमत ख़ाना, English: The Paradise of Food) is an Urdu-Language novel written by Khalid Jawed. It was first published in June 2014 by Arshia publication, Delhi. It has been translated in Hindi and English. The English translated work of Nemat Khana is titled as The Paradise of Food, which won the JCB prize for literature 2022.

== Plot & Themes ==
The novel is set against the 50-year lifespan of an orphan child named Zaheeruddin Babr alias Guddu Miyan. He lives in a middle-class joint family in the northern region. The storyline is running from his narration and provides the story in the form of a memoir. The story reveals unique habits of his family members with the changes in the societal framework. The kitchen and its tools are used as a metaphor for exploring the human attitude.

The novel explored themes like Disgust & Desire, Kitchen as a battleground, Lust and Taboo. The narrative style of this Novel has explored the darkness of the human existence.

== Translation and publication history ==
The Urdu novel was first published in June 2014 by Arshia Publication, Delhi. Later, it was translated into English by Prof Baran Farooqi and published by Juggernaut Publications in 2022. The Hindi translation was done by Zaman Tarif and published by Surya Prakashan Mandir in 2022 only. Once it received the critical acclaim in among the critics and readers, Rekhta Foundation also brought the Hindi translation of this Novel in 2024.

== Critical reception ==
Shuma Raha of Deccan Chronicle wrote "The Paradise of Food is a complex work that will fill you with disquiet, but if you read it, it will likely leave an indelible impression on you.", Chintan Girish Modi of Moneycontrol wrote "Pick up this book if you do not mind reading about worms in intestines, people spitting phlegm, lizards falling into boiling milk, and bloodstains that look like korma gravy." and Saloni Sharma of Scroll.in wrote "Despite its eschewal of realism, this novel is a text cognisant of the political climate it has been written in.".

The book has been also reviewed by Ekram Khawar of The Indian Wire, Syed Saad Ahmed of Hindustan Times, Bindu Menon of The Tribune India and The Times of India.

== Award ==
The English translation of this book titled as The Paradise of Food was awarded JCB Prize for Literature 2022.
