= Manjaveyil Maranangal =

2011 novel by Benyamin

- Author: Benyamin
- Language: Malayalam
- Genre: Crime, Thriller
- Publisher: DC Books
- Publication date: 2011
- Publication place: India
- English publication date: November 25, 2015
- Pages: 349

Manjaveyil Maranangal is a 2011 Malayalam language novel written by Benyamin. An English translation was published in 2015 under the title Yellow Lights of Death.

== Characters ==
- Christy
- Jesintha
- Senthil
