= Sudhanshu Chaturvedi =

Indian writer (Born: 1943)

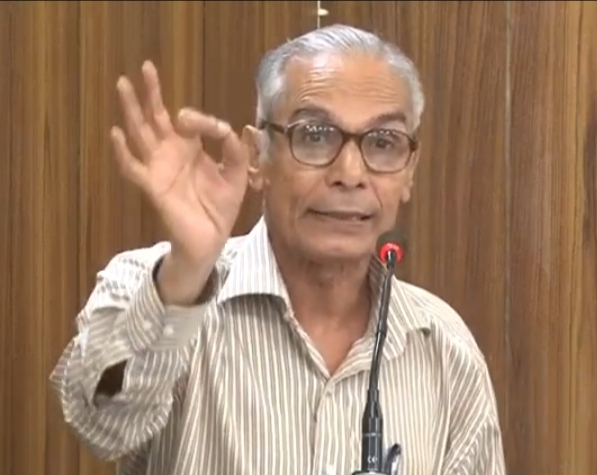
- Born: 15 February 1943 (age 83); Madhonagar, United Provinces, British India
- Education: University of Delhi, University of Kerala
- Occupations: Writer, Translator, Academic
- Writing career
- Notable awards: Sahitya Akademi Award; Kerala Sahitya Akademi Award; Indian Council for Child Education Award; Rangeya Raghav Paryatan Puraskar; Uttar Pradesh Hindi Sansthan Souhard Samman

Sudhanshu Chaturvedi is a writer, translator and academic from Uttar Pradesh, India. He has authored or translated over 120 books in Malayalam, Hindi, Sanskrit and English. Even though his mother tongue is Hindi, he has written most of his books in Malayalam.

He is a former member of the Official Language Committee of the Ministries of Defense, Railways, Urban Development and Poverty Alleviation and is currently the Director of the National Literary Academy.

He has received many awards including Sahitya Akademi Award for translation (1995, for Rassi, translation of Malayalam novel Kayar), Kerala Sahitya Akademi Award for Scientific Literature, Indian Council for Child Education Award for children's literature, Rangeya Raghav Paryatan Puraskar and Uttar Pradesh Hindi Sansthan Souhard Samman.

Nilayilekkozhukiya ganga is the biography of Sudhanshu Chaturvedi written by E. Jayachandran and published by Kerala Bhasha Institute.

== Biography ==
He was born on 15 February 1943 in Madho Nagar, near Kanpur in Kannauj district of Uttar Pradesh.

In 1962, Sudhanshu met Jawaharlal Nehru, the first Prime Minister of India, to demand that Hindi be made the national language of India. He told Nehru that, speakers of other languages should be strictly instructed to learn Hindi by 1965. In response, Nehru rejected his proposal and said that he had to satisfy the entire people of India. Nehru then asked him to study one of the difficult Dravidian language Malayalam. He took up Nehru's challenge and joined the University of Delhi for his master's degree in Malayalam and from there graduated in 1964. He also holds Masters in Sanskrit and Hindi. After completing his MA in 1964, he came Kerala and was appointed Hindi Lecturer at Sri Kerala Varma College, Thrissur. He remained there and retired as department head and college principal. He holds a doctorate in Hindi and Malayalam from the University of Kerala. He is the first D.Lit graduate from the University of Kerala.

Sudhamshu, who spent 43 years in Kerala, has settled in Delhi after his retirement.

== Literary contributions ==
He has authored or translated over 120 books in Malayalam, Hindi, Sanskrit and English. His first translation was a book on Russian Constitution written by Dr. V. R. Sahni, which he translated to Hindi. In 1964 he translated first Malayalam novel to Hindi, which was Odayil Ninnu by P. Kesavadev (Hindi title Nale Se). His book named Sankshiptam Balakandam was a prescribed text for B.A. and B.A. (Hons.) degree. He also published two dictionaries, Hindi-Hindi-Malayalam and Malayalam-Malayalam-Hindi.

=== Translated from Sanskrit to English ===
- Kalidasa Sahityasarvaswam - Complete works of Kalidasa
- Bhasa Nataka Sarvaswam -Complete works of Bhasa

=== Translated from Sanskrit into Malayalam ===
- Kalidasa Sahityasarvasvam - Complete Works of Kalidasa
- Bhasa Nataka Sarvasvam - Complete Drama Works of Bhasa
- Srimad Valmiki Ramayana (4 volumes) Literal Translation

=== Translated from Hindi to Malayalam ===
He has translated many works from Hindi to Malayalam, including Akannupoya chithrangal, Ara divasam and Amruthum vishavum.

=== Translated from Malayalam to Hindi ===
He has translated over forty best Malayalam works into Hindi, including Chinthavishtayaya seetha (Kumaranasan), Sandhya, Balyakalasakhi (Vaikom Muhammad Basheer), Odayil Ninnu (P. Kesavadev), Ayalkkar (P. Kesavadev), Himagiri Viharam (Tapovanaswamy), Enippadikal (Thakazhi Sivasankara Pillai), Sundarikalum Sundaranmarum (Uroob), Professor, Kanyaka, Kanchana Sita (C. N. Sreekantan Nair), Indulekha (O. Chandhu Menon), Agnisakshi (Lalithambika Antharjanam), Kayar (Thakazhi Sivasankara Pillai), Tathvamasi (Sukumar Azhikode), Mayyazhippuzhayude Theerangalil (M. Mukundan), Veluthampi dalava (Kainikkara Padmanabha Pillai).

=== Other works ===
- Nadi samdrathilekk thanne (His first independent Malayalam novel)
- Theerabhoomi(Malayalam novel)
- Janmaantharam (Malayalam novel)
- Navabharatha shilpikal
- Bharatheeya prathibhakal
- Anthyabhilasham(Malayalam novel)
- Chinnichithariya Mohangal(Malayalam novel)
- Karmadheerante kaalppadukal (Biography of Lal Bahadur Shastri)
- Sumaanjali (Hindi poetry collection)
- Kavithayute Kallukal (Malayalam poetry collection)

== Awards ==
- Sahitya Akademi Translation Prize (for his translation Kayar to Hindi)
- Rangeya Raghav Paryatan Puraskar
- Kerala Sahitya Akademi Award for Scientific Literature
- Dr. Gargi Gupta Anuvad Shree Award for Outstanding Contribution to Translation
- Indian Council for Child Education Award for children's literature
- Uttar Pradesh Hindi Sansthan Souhard Samman
- Vachaspati Award
- Rashtrabhasha Ratna Rashtriya Samman
- Manumitra Award
- Sahitya Ratnam
- Vidyavaridhi Puraskaram
