= Gods and Ends =

Novel by Lindsay Pereira

- Author: Lindsay Pereira
- Language: English
- Publisher: Penguin Random House India
- Publication date: March 2021
- Publication place: India
- Pages: 256
- ISBN: 9780670094387
- Website: www.lindsaypereira.com

Gods and Ends is the debut novel by writer Lindsay Pereira. It was published by Penguin Random House India in March 2021. Set in Orlem, Malad, a suburb of Mumbai populated by a large Roman Catholic community. It is described as a book about invisible people in a city of millions, and the claustrophobia they rarely manage to escape from. The title is a reference to people who are twice marginalized—for being a minority community and living in a small, lesser-known part of a large suburb.

== Reception ==
The novel was described by The Hindu as "a stark and fearless portrayal of the Roman Catholic community in the Bombay of yore." The publication Firstpost described it as "stark in its simplicity," adding that the writer "uses dialogue and narration with good effect, giving each character enough space to tell their story." The newspaper Mid Day said "Pereira’s chronicling subtly encapsulates their eccentricities, including the diction and acerbic humour, all of which will resonate with not just Bombaywallahs."

Platform Magazine wrote: "The tragedy of this book and its characters is real, and the narrative manages to create necessary space for the lives and stories of people, who are generally erased from our imagination of the limitless city of Bombay." Janhavi Acaharekar, reviewing the book, wrote: "Pereira’s well-crafted characters are born of a familiarity with the milieu he writes about, and his honesty is brutal." A review in the Mint Lounge called it "an acerbic, funny and, at times, brutally honest portrayal of Goan Catholics settled in the suburb of Orlem."

== Awards ==
Gods and Ends was short-listed for the 2021 JCB Prize for Literature. A citation from the judges said: "With a biting sense of humour and a quirky voice, Lindsay Pereira puts forth an intriguing debut. Part of the attraction lies in its unconventional form and structure. Each of the residents of Obrigado mansion seem to be competing in being more malevolent and pathetic than the other, making each of them particularly foul, but Pereira doesn’t offer any excuses for them, making them all unforgettable."

The novel was also shortlisted for the Tata Literature Live! First Book Award for Fiction in November, 2021. It was also longlisted for the PFC-Valley of Words Book Awards 2022.

His second novel, The Memoirs of Valmiki Rao, was longlisted for the 2024 Crossword Book Awards for fiction in October. It won the Mumbai Literature Live! Literary Award for fiction book of the year in November, 2024.

== The author ==
Born in Orlem, Malad, Lindsay Pereira grew up in Bombay. He studied at St. Xavier's College and the University of Mumbai and obtained a PhD in literature for his work on gender attitudes implicit in nineteenth-century Indian fiction. He has worked as a journalist and writer for publications including The Huffington Post, The Globe and Mail, and New York Observer and has been a columnist with the daily Mid-Day since 2015.

He was also co-editor with the late poet Eunice de Souza of Women's Voices: Selections from Nineteenth and Early-Twentieth Century Indian Writing in English, published by Oxford University Press.

His second novel, The Memoirs of Valmiki Rao, was published by Penguin Random House India in August 2023. A retelling of the ancient Sanskrit epic Ramayana, it was described by translator and writer Arshia Sattar as "an elegy to a city wilfully destroyed by greed and cynicism, a lament to dreams that died and people that were murdered, a dirge that mourns the concerted dismantling of systems of thinking and being that upheld tolerance and compassion." The novel was also called "a clever reimagination of the Ramayana that terrifies and evokes pity." It won the Mumbai Literature Live! Literary Award for fiction book of the year in November, 2024.

In 2025, a collection of his short stories titled Songs Our Bodies Sing was published by Penguin Random House. A review in Scroll described it as 'an uneven yet memorable collection of stories about lives on the margins.' According to the Deccan Chronicle, 'though not all the stories in this collection work to equal effect, they suggest a writer admirably exploring newer, bolder horizons.' Telegraph India said the stories 'testify to the fact that the struggles to belong and other challenges to the human condition are universal.' Open Magazine said: 'Pereira's writing is lucid, his characters real, and the world he conjures up a reminder that there is, despite the gloom, the occasional ray of light too.'

His third novel, Super, was published by HarperCollins India. According to Open Magazine, "Set in a bleak world in which the most ordinary living seems out of bounds, there are no winners in Pereira’s novel. Its most decisive individual actions, even murder, are shaped by forces beyond one’s control." Mint Lounge called it "a dark cautionary tale, clinically documenting scams and the pitfalls of giving into them, offering not a glimmer of hope."

== Books ==
- Women's Voices: Selections from Nineteenth and Early Twentieth Century Indian Writing in English [Oxford University Press, Published November 2003, ISBN 978-0-19-566785-1]
- Gods and Ends [Penguin Vintage Books, Published March 2021, ISBN 978-0-14-345824-1]
- The Memoirs of Valmiki Rao [Penguin Vintage Books, Published August 2023, ISBN 978-0-670-09833-0]
- Songs Our Bodies Sing [Penguin Vintage Books, Published April 2025, ISBN 978-0-670-09834-7]
- Super [HarperCollins Fourth Estate, Published March 2026, ISBN 978-93-6569-926-5]
