= Christy (2023 film) =

- Theatrical release poster
- Directed by: Alvin Henry
- Screenplay by: Benyamin; G. R. Indugopan
- Story by: Alvin Henry
- Produced by: Sajai Sebastian; Kannan Satheesan
- Starring: Malavika Mohanan; Mathew Thomas
- Cinematography: Anend C. Chandran
- Edited by: Manu Antony
- Music by: Govind Vasantha
- Production company: Rocky Mountain Cinemas
- Release date: 17 February 2023
- Running time: 142 minutes
- Country: India
- Language: Malayalam

Christy is a 2023 Indian Malayalam-language romantic drama film directed by Alvin Henry in his directorial debut and written by Benyamin and G. R. Indugopan. The film stars Malavika Mohanan in the title role and Mathew Thomas in the lead role.

Based on a true story, the film was released in theaters on 17 February 2023 and received mixed reviews from critics. The movie was a box-office bomb.

== Plot ==
Roy, a 12th-grade student, lives in Poovar with his aunt for his studies, but frequently skips classes. His mother, Lissy, threatens to bring him home if he does not improve his academic performance, but his aunt hires a tutor named Christy for him. Roy visits Christy's house for tutoring and finds her distressed. He tells his aunt that something seems wrong with her and that he does not want to return. However, he agrees to continue being tutored by Christy because his mother has convinced the school administrator to allow him to take an important exam. Christy is unhappy, having gotten recently divorced. She has a tense relationship with her father, Joseph, because he frequently borrows large sums of money from her. Roy falls in love with Christy during their tutoring sessions. Their friendship grows and Roy passes the exam. Now a college student, Roy decides to confess his love to Christy. He learns that Christy wants to become a school teacher in the Maldives and she requires two lakhs for the job, which angers Joseph.

Roy proposes to Christy, leaving her startled and speechless. On her first day of work, Roy arrives at the airport with his friend, only to see her board the flight. Roy is on the bus when Christy calls, but he does not have enough money to return her call. On Roy's birthday, Christy gives him a camera. Roy tries to kiss Christy, but she rejects him. Over time, they rekindle their relationship and Roy becomes even more in love with Christy. Christy tells Roy that she has opened a new bank account to prevent her father from stealing her money. She asks Roy to check the account and confirm whether all the money she sends to it is received. Later, Roy is angry that Christy is late to meet him and they fight. At the end of the film, Roy returns to Poovar and uses the camera Christy gave him to take pictures of fish struggling to return to the sea.

== Cast ==
- Malavika Mohanan as Christy Joseph
- Mathew Thomas as Roy Johnny
- Joy Mathew as Joseph Tharian Kaithakkal, Christy's father
- Neena Kurup as Elizabeth Joseph, Christy's mother
- Veena Nair as Susie
- Muthumani as Malini
- Sajai Sebastian as Johnny Cherian, Roy's father
- Manju Pathrose as Lissie, Roy's mother
- Jaya Kurup as Laly Cherian
- Rajesh Madhavan as Father Shelly
- Savithri Sreedharan as Accama Tharian, Christy's grandmother
- Benyamin as Thomas (cameo)
- Alister Alex as Peter
- Arjun Aryan as Jenson
- Gokul Vinu as Glady
- Akhil Ashok as Econiyas
- Akshaya as Janet
- Rahul Reghu as Kiran
- Alvin Henry as Passenger, Uncredited (cameo)
- G.R. Indugopan as Air passenger, Uncredited (cameo)
- Vineeth Vishwam as Joji Joseph
- Drishya Padmanabhan as Soniya Mary Varghese, Joji's wife
- Urmila Krishnan as Hudha
- Aravind Deepu as Shameer
- Akhil Kavalayoor as Driver Surannan
- RJ Murugan as Garudan Sir
- Vincent Vadakkan as Abdul Rasheed
- George Kora as Sajan
- Cylex Abhram as Shamnad
- Kannan Satheesan as Airport staff member (cameo)
- Sibi Thomas as Auto driver (cameo)
- Noushad Shahul as Travel Agent
- Renjith Vijayan as Mobile Shopkeeper

== Production ==
Principal photography for the film began on 21 September 2022 with a pooja held at Hotel Geethu International in Poovar, near Thiruvananthapuram, and in the Maldives. Christy is the directorial debut of Alvin Henry. The screenplay was written by Benyamin and G. R. Indugopan. The film was produced by Sajai Sebastian and Kannan Satheesan through the production company Rocky Mountains Cinemas. Anend C. Chandran was the cinematographer, Sameera Saneesh was the costume designer, and Govind Vasantha composed the music.

== Soundtrack ==
Govind Vasantha is the music director of the movie. He composed four songs and also provided the background scores for the film.

Song	Singer	Lyricist	Ref.
Paal Manam	Kapil Kabilan Keerthana Vaidyanathan	Vinayak Sasikumar	
Poovar	Govind Vasantha	Vinayak Sasikumar	
Oro Shwasavum	Govind Vasantha	Anwar Ali	
Maali Paattu	Govind Vasantha Kapil Kabilan	Vinayak Sasikumar	

== Release ==
The teaser for the film was released on 26 January. The trailer followed on 10 February, and the film was released in theaters on 17 February 2023.

The screenplay of the film, published by Manorama Books, was released on 14 February 2023 during the audio launch in Thiruvananthapuram.

The digital rights to the film were acquired by Sony LIV, and it began streaming on 10 March 2023.

== Reception ==
The film received mixed responses upon release. S. R. Praveen from The Hindu said that the film "portrays a unique relationship convincingly, but the shoddy writing and a poor third act does no justice to the soul of the story." Rating the film 3 out of 5, The Times of India's reviewer appreciated Malavika Mohanan's performance but felt that the "message conveyed by the film is questionable, and perhaps not even acceptable." Cinema Express' critic rated the film 3.5 out of 5, noting that it "is one of those love stories that spend enough time exploring the mental landscape of its principal characters." A reviewer from Malayala Manorama described the film as a "celebration of unconditional love." Rating the film 2.5 out of 5, India Today's reviewer appreciated the lead performances but felt that the film's portrayal of the romantic relationship was one-sided.
