= Prema Jayakumar =

Indian translator (born 1952)

- Born: 1952 (age 73–74); Kozhikode, Kerala
- Occupation: Translator
- Writing career
- Notable awards: Kerala Sahitya Akademi Award for Overall Contributions (2023)

Prema Jayakumar is an Indian translator from Kerala. She translated many noted works from Malayalam to English. She received the Kerala Sahitya Akademi Award for Overall Contributions in 2024.

== Biography ==
Prema Jayakumar was born in Kozhikode in 1952. He father B.K. Menon, a banker, was also a poet and writer. She holds a Master's degree in English Literature and worked as an officer in the State Bank of India for 20 years.

== Literary contributions ==
Prema translated the novel Aswathathmavu, written by writer and actor Madampu Kunjukuttan into English. That was her first translation. Writer N. N. Kakkad, who was also a family friend and who read it, encouraged her efforts at translation.

Later, Prema translated the historical novel "Theekdal Kadanju Thirumadhuram" written by novelist C. Radhakrishnan, about the life of the Ezhuthachan, into English under the title Nectar from the Sea of Fire. She translated Sethu's Marupiravi into English as The Saga of Muziris. Sethu's Pandavapuram was translated when she was advised to take bed rest during her pregnancy. Sethu's another work Niyogam was translated as The Wind from the Hills. This book was nominated for the Crossword Award in the Indian Language Fiction Translation category in 2008. Before that, in 2005, Prema was nominated for the Crossword Award for her translation of V.K. Madhavankutty's novel Aashreekaram (English title: The Unspoken Curse).

Her other major translations include English translations of M. Mukundan's Daivatthinte Vikrithikal (English: God's Mischief) and Haridwaril Manimuzhangumbol (English title: The Bells are Ringing in Haridwar), Malayattoor Ramakrishnan's Yakshi, Aram Viral (English title:Sixth Finger), and Mrithiyude Kavadam (English title:Doorways to Death), Sethu's Jalasamadhi, among others. The BBC has selected the translation of Yakshi for their 'Off the Bookshelf' radio programme.

C. V. Raman Pillai's epic novel Marthandavarma was translated into English by her father B.K. Menon in 1936. 62 years later, Prema revised this translation and it was reprinted by the Sahitya Akademi in 1998. She has also translated Rama Raja Bahadur by C. V. Raman Pillai.

Prema has also written many books based on Indian mythology and epics in children's literature genre.

== Works ==
=== Translations ===
- The saga of Muziris (1st ed.). New Delhi, India: Niyogi Books. December 14, 2016. ISBN 978-9385285578.
- The sixth finger. Delhi, India: Ratna Books. November 1, 2017. ISBN 978-9386600479.
- Nectar From Sea of Fire. HiTech Books. January 1, 2023. ISBN 9789381399460.
- Jalasamadhi and other stories: Short Stories. Ratna Books. February 20, 2020. ISBN 9789352907427.
- The Bells are Ringing in Haridwar: Three novellas. Ratna Books. February 20, 2020. ISBN 9789352907434.
- Rama Raja Bahadur. New Delhi: Sahitya Akademi. January 1, 2003. ISBN 978-8126017867.
- Yakshi. Amazon. June 22, 2023. Kindle edition (ASIN:B0C93WC548).
- The unspoken curse. New Delhi: India Research Press. April 30, 2006. ISBN 978-8187943846.
- Pandavapuram. Chennai: Mcmillan India. 1995. ISBN 978-0333923085.
- The Wind from the Hills. Tranquebar. January 1, 2008. ISBN 978-8189975647.
- God's mischief. New Delhi: Penguin Books. 2002. ISBN 978-0143028772.
- The Trial of the Mahatma: Novel. Yeti Books. 2002. ISBN 978-81-88330-07-2.
- Doorways to death: two novellas on death and rebirth. New Delhi: Penguin Books. 1995. ISBN 978-0-14-025561-4.

=== Children's literature ===
- Krishna. Partridge Publishing. November 29, 2013. ISBN 978-8126441457. Story of Krishna in simplified English for children.
- Karna. DC Books. December 1, 2012. ISBN 9788126436439. Story of Karna in simplified English for children.
- Mahabharata: The Roll of the Dice. DC Books. January 1, 2020. ISBN 9788126426201. A story from the Mahabharata, written in simplified English for children
- Mahabharata: The Great War. DC Books. January 1, 2022. ISBN 9788126426218. A story from the Mahabharata, written in simplified English for children.
- Mahabharata: The Final Battle. Real Reads. June 10, 2011. ISBN 9781906230333. A story from the Mahabharata, written in simplified English for children
- Ramayana. DC Books. December 1, 2011. ISBN 9788126425488. Simplified English translation of Ramayana for children.
- Shakuntalam. DC Books. January 1, 2022. ISBN 9788126429011. Simplified English translation of Shakuntala for children.

== Awards and honors ==
Prema received the Kerala Sahitya Akademi Award for Overall Contributions (for 2023) in 2024. She received the V. Abdullah Translation Award in 2024 for translating C. Radhakrishnan's Theekkadal Kadanju Thirumadhuram under the title Nectar from Sea of Fire. Her translation work Nectar from Sea of Fire also won the 2024 C.P. Menon Memorial Award. She was also shortlisted for the Crossword Prize three times.
