= Khalid Jawed =

Indian novelist

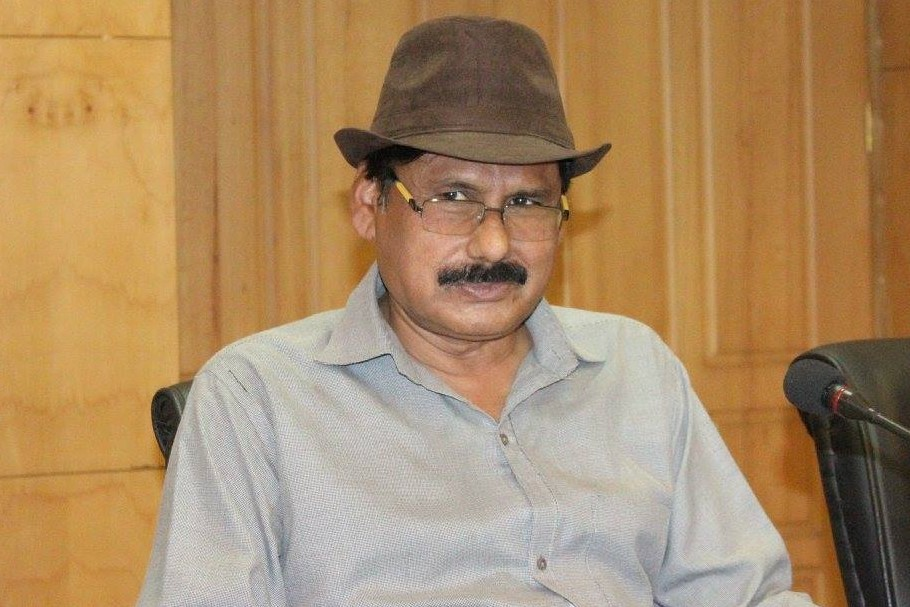
- Born: Khalid Jawed; 9 March 1960 (age 66); India
- Occupation: Novelist

Khalid Jawed (born 9 March 1960) is an Indian novelist. Some of his works include Aakhri Dawat, Nemat Khana and Maut ki Kitab, critically acclaimed for his unique style and narrative. He served as a professor at Jamia Millia Islamia, New Delhi. Jawed is also considered an expert on popular literature. He is equally popular in India and Pakistan.

== Career ==
Critic Shafe Qidwai said "Khalid Jawed does not bury the plot behind the heavy pall of magic realism technique and his style is imbued with a new artistic coherence and he weaves a series of memories and wistful experiences into a viable pattern. It is hoped that the Maut ki Kitab will be noticed in literary circles."

The English translation of Jawed's novel Nemat Khana, The Paradise of Food', won the JCB Prize for Literature in 2022.

== Bibliography ==
- Aakhiri Dawat, 2007, Penguin Books India.
- Tafreeh Ki Ek Dopehr, 2008, Scheherzade, Karaachi
- Kahani, Maut Aur Aakhiri Bidesi Zaban, 2008, Educational Publishing House, Delhi
- Gabriel Garcia Marquez: Fan Aur Shakhsiyat|2009|Karnataka Urdu Academy, Bangalore
- Gabriel Garcia Marquez: Fan Aur Shakhsiyat|2010|Scheherzade, karaachi
- Maut Ki Kitaab|2011|Arshia Publications, Delhi
- Milan Kundera|2011|Arshia Publications, Delhi
- Nemat Khana|2014|Arshia Publications, Delhi

== Translations ==
- Maut Ki Kitab,(Hindi), 2015, Dakhal Parkashan, Delhi
- Nemat Khana is translated in English as The Paradise of Food by Baran Farooqi, 2022, Juggernaut Publication, Delhi
- Ek Khanjar Paani Mein (Hindi) Setu Prakashan, 2022

=== Books on Khalid Jawed ===
Khalid Jawed: Shakhsiyat Aur Fan|2017|EDUCATIONAL PUBLISHING HOUSE, DEHLI ASIN: B072XKCCW9

== Awards ==
- Katha Award by Katha in 1997
- UP Urdu Academy Award, Lucknow in 2014
- Delhi Urdu Academy Award for Creative Prose in 2017
- UP Urdu Academy Fiction Award 2020
- JCB Prize for literature 2022
