= Jasmine Days =

2014 novel by Benyamin

- First edition (Malayalam)
- Author: Benyamin
- Original title: Mullappoo Niramulla Pakalukal
- Translator: Shahnaz Habib
- Language: English
- Genre: Fiction
- Publisher: Juggernaut Books
- Publication date: June 2018; 2014 (Original)
- Publication place: India
- Media type: Print (Paperback)
- Pages: 280
- ISBN: 9789386228741

Jasmine Days is a 2014 Malayalam novel by Benyamin and translated into English by Shahnaz Habib. It tells the story of Sameera Parvin, a young Pakistani woman who works as a radio jockey in an unnamed Middle Eastern country which is on the verge of revolution. First published in 2014 as Mullappoo Niramulla Pakalukal, the novel won the inaugural JCB Prize. It was published by Juggernaut Books.

== Development ==
Writer Benyamin has been living in Bahrain for 20 years and his novel Goat Days (2008) tells the story of an abused Indian migrant worker in Saudi Arabia. He said that the real-life incidents of the Arab Spring served as the inspiration for Jasmine Days. He also developed the main characters based on the personalities of his own friends and acquaintances.

== Reception ==
Trisha Gupta of Scroll.in felt that the novel has "more locales, many more characters and a much more complex political landscape" than Benyamin's previous work. She wrote: "But what Benyamin pulls off again is Sameera’s voice: the almost spoken-word simplicity with which this landscape is rendered makes it hard not to listen." C.P Surendran of The Hindu called it "a serious effort to come to terms with the world around us." But, he felt that the novel is "not exceptionally inspirational either in terms of writing or flow of the narrative."

Faizal Khan of The Financial Express wrote: "Benyamin’s craft of conversation-driven storytelling succeeds in revealing the tensions in a society starting to unravel. Nearly every character has a story from their tradition to add to the local narrative." Supriya Nair of Mint called, "The novel is told in first person, but it isn’t really concerned with interiority: it’s the great knock-about events of the story, its gasping pace of riots, deaths, family feuds and mourning, that imbalances our senses." Nandini Nair felt that the "power of Jasmine Days is that it tells a compelling story, but doesn't take sides."
