= Daivathinte Vikrithikal =

1992 film by Lenin Rajendran

- Directed by: Lenin Rajendran
- Screenplay by: M. Mukundan; Lenin Rajendran
- Story by: M. Mukundan
- Based on: Daivathinte Vikrithikal by M. Mukundan
- Starring: Raghuvaran; Srividya; Rajan P. Dev; Malavika
- Cinematography: Madhu Ambat
- Edited by: N. Gopalakrishnan
- Music by: Mohan Sitara; 13 AD (title track)
- Production company: Sowparnika Movie Arts
- Release date: 1992
- Running time: 120 minutes
- Country: India
- Language: Malayalam

Daivathinte Vikrithikal (transl. Mischiefs of God) is a 1992 Indian Malayalam-language drama film directed by Lenin Rajendran, who also co-wrote the screenplay with M. Mukundan, based on Mukundan's novel of the same name. The film tells the story of Alphonso, a man who chooses to suffer a slow, torturous life in his little village, Mahe, in preference to fortunes and pleasures away from it. The film stars Raghuvaran, Srividya, Rajan P. Dev and Malavika.

Raghuvaran was shortlisted for the National Film Award for Best Actor, along with Mithun Chakraborty (for Tahader Katha), but Chakraborty won the award.

== Cast ==
- Raghuvaran as Alphonso
- Srividya as Maggi
- Rajan P. Dev
- Malavika as Elsie
- Thilakan as Kumaran Vaidyar
- Vineeth as Sasi, Son of Kumaran Vaidyar
- Sudheesh as Sivan, Son of Kumaran Vaidyar
- Appa Haja
- Riza Bava as Micheal
- Anil Murali
- Siddique

== Awards ==
Kerala State Film Awards

- Kerala State Film Award for Best Film
- Kerala State Film Award for Best Actress: Srividya
- Kerala State Film Award for Best Story: M. Mukundan
- Kerala State Film Award for Best Costume Designer: Danda Pani

== Novel ==
The film is based on an award-winning novel of the same name by M. Mukundan. The novel, published in 1989 by D. C. Books, is considered a sequel to Mukundan's magnum opus Mayyazhipuzhayude Theerangalil. The novel won the Kendra Sahitya Akademi Award and N. V. Prize. It was translated to English under the title God's Mischief by Penguin Books in 2002.

== Trivia ==
The film featured a poem, Irulin Mahanidrayil, written and rendered by poet V. Madhusudanan Nair .
