= Akkapporinte Irupathu Nasrani Varshangal =

2008 novel by Benyamin

- Author: Benyamin
- Language: Malayalam
- Subject: Christian History
- Publisher: DC Books
- Publication date: August 2008
- Publication place: India
- Media type: Print
- Pages: 139
- ISBN: 978-81-264-2086-5
- Followed by: Manthalirile 20 Communist Varshangal

Akkapporinte Irupathu Nasrani Varshangal (transl. Twenty Years of Christian Quarrels) is a Malayalam novel written by Benyamin. The novel narrates years of long clash between two major Eastern Syrian Churches of Kerala. Through the course of the novel the reader gets the history of Christian Churches operating in Kerala and how they were separated from a common Syrian Parent Church and this novel was the first installment of Manthalir Trilogy series.

== Premise ==
The writer bases its content on a family and place named Manthalir wrapping many historical incidents necessary to do so. The novel follows an engaging narrative. Even though the novel is a fictional work most of the incidents depicted in the novel has overt historical connections.

== Sequel ==
Benyamin's novel Manthalirile 20 Communist Varshangal is a sequel to Akkapporinte Irupathu Nasrani Varshangal.
