= Pravasam =

2008 Malayalam novel by M. Mukundan

- Author: M. Mukundan
- Language: Malayalam
- Genre: Novel
- Publisher: DC Books
- Publication date: 23 August 2008
- Publication place: India
- Pages: 432
- ISBN: 9788126419890

Pravasam is a 2008 Malayalam novel written by M. Mukundan. According to the author, the novel is an attempt to re-define nostalgia which is thought to be the essence of life of non-resident Malayalis and to pay respect to hundreds of thousands of Malayalis living as non-resident Keralites in different parts of the world. It is a novel that travels through generations. It depicts a clear picture of the life stories of various persons living in various parts of the world as non-resident Keralites. It explains us about the different kinds of feelings of various kinds of people who had left their homeland for various reasons. These reasons include the emigration for the sake of seeking a better profession, for studies, for getting a better class of living and so on. But almost all of them dreams of returning to their homeland one day and enjoying the homeliness. One of the issues the books addresses is the question of cultural identity of the Malayali.

Malayalam author S. K. Pottekkatt is a major character in the narrative. In the beginning, the story is told by Pottekkatt; after his death, it was completed by Mukundan.

The novel was officially released on 23 August 2008 by former Kerala minister Binoy Viswam during the 6th World Malayali Conference held in Singapore. A formal release function was also held at Kerala on 18 September 2008. Former minister M. A. Baby handed over the first copy of the book to Sukumar Azhikode.

M. Mukundan won the Habeeb Valappad Award in 2009 for this novel. Also, the 2009 Mudranamikavu Awards for Excellence in Book Production, instituted by the Department of Printing and Publishing of Mahatma Gandhi University, was awarded to DC Books for the printing and production of Pravasam.
