= Kesavan's Lamentations =

1999 novel by M. Mukundan

- Author: M. Mukundan
- Original title: Kesavante Vilapangal
- Translator: A. J. Thomas
- Language: Malayalam
- Genre: Novel
- Publisher: DC Books, Rupa & Co.
- Publication date: 1999
- Publication place: India
- English publication date: 2006
- Awards: Vayalar Award; Crossword Book Award

Kesavan's Lamentations (original title: Kesavante Vilapangal) is a 1999 novel by M. Mukundan, originally written in Malayalam. It tells the story of a writer Kesavan who writes a novel on a child named Appukkuttan who grows under the influence of E. M. S. Namboodiripad.

== Plot summary ==
Written as a story within a story, the book recreates the internal and external chaos involved in the process of Kesavan's writing, as he pens his book, Appukkuttan's Lamentations. The story deals with the life and death of Kesavan as well as with the life and obsessions of the protagonist of Kesavan's book, the boy called Appukkuttan, who deifies E. M. S. Namboodiripad, under whose portrait's gaze he slept and woke as a child. The narrative travels back and forth between Kesavan and Appukkuttan.

== Awards ==
- 2003: Vayalar Award - M. Mukundan
- 2006: Crossword Book Award for Indian Language Fiction Translation - M. Mukundan and A. J. Thomas for the English translation

== Reception ==
Citation for the Crossword Book Award by H. S. Shiva Prakash, Subashree Krishnaswamy and Dilip Kumar:

"Kesavan’s Lamentations is a widely acclaimed work of contemporary fiction in Malayalam, which examines the mystique around E M S Namboodiripad, one of the major icons of Kerala politics. By telescoping divergent narrative positions and techniques in a variety of language registers, Mukundan has created a deeply fascinating novel. Serious and humorous at once, it appeals at different levels to a wide cross-section of readers - an achievement that has earned him the Hutch Crossword Book Award second time around. A J Thomas, well-known translator from Malayalam and an Indian English poet, has recreated successfully in English the resonances and nuances of the source text."

In 2026, Kallara Ajayan, writing in Kesari weekly, argued that Kerala's communists had misinterpreted the novel, praising it as a leftist work when, in fact, it ridicules communists. He also noted that Marxists had failed to recognise this, despite O. N. V. Kurup and others having previously pointed it out.
