= Orlem =

Neighbourhood in Mumbai

- Suburb
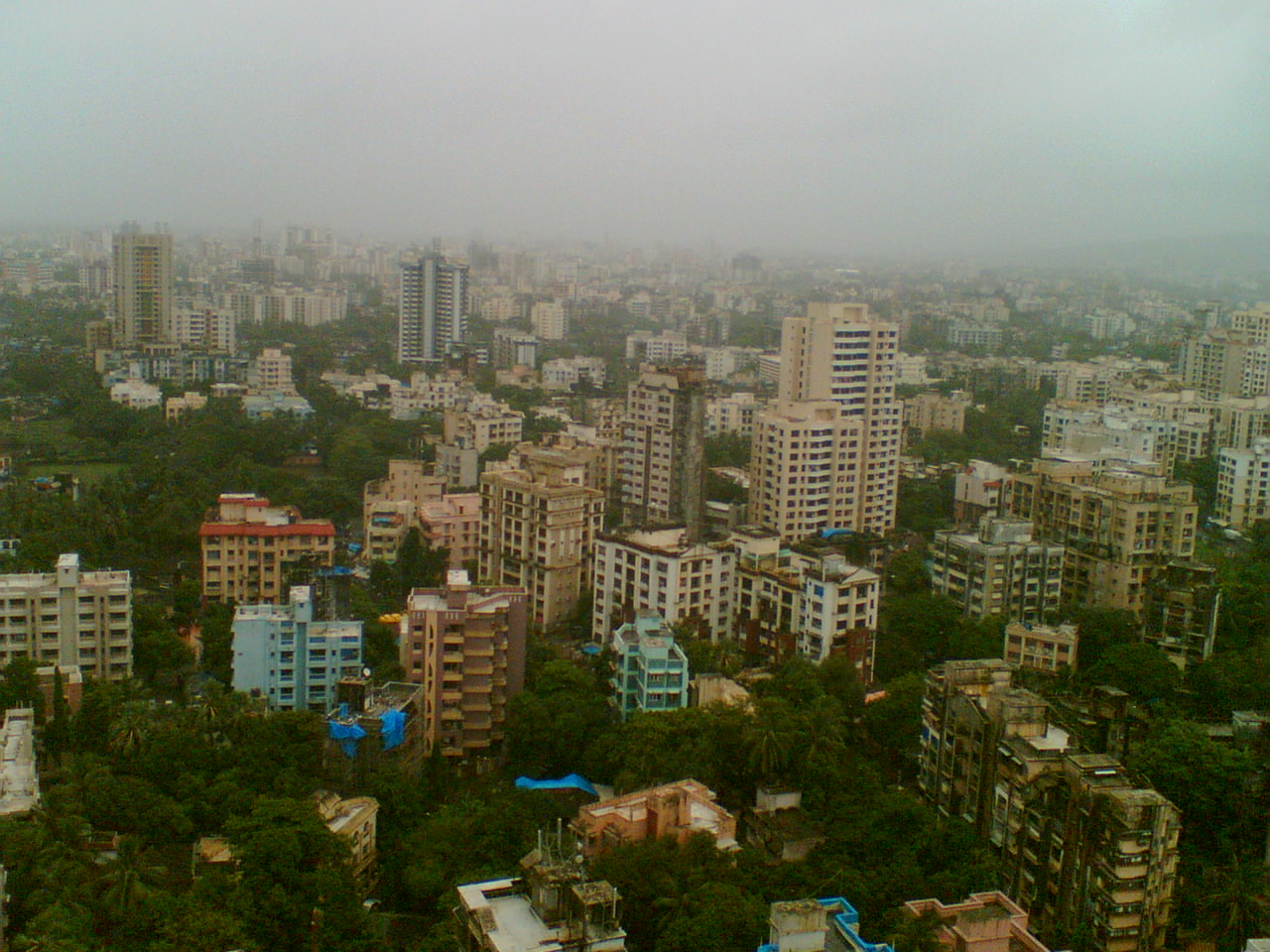

- Location within Mumbai
- Country: India
- State: Maharashtra
- District: Mumbai Suburban
- City: Mumbai

Government
  - Type: Municipal Corporation
  - Body: Brihanmumbai Municipal Corporation (MCGM)

Languages
  - Official: Marathi
- Time zone: UTC+5:30 (IST)
- PIN: 400064
- Area code: 022
- Civic agency: BMC

Orlem is a neighbourhood in Malad, a suburb of Mumbai. Its original name in the official language of the state (Marathi) is Valnai, a term used to describe the area as "Valan" meaning turn or curve. The village was settled on a path that curved. The postal zip code 400064 serves the neighborhood. According to a Church census conducted in 2004, it was the largest parish in the Archdiocese of Bombay.

== Location ==
Orlem is situated at the northern part of Mumbai in the western suburb of Malad. It branches from the main road called Marve Road, which is the main route to Marve beach from Swami Vivekanand Road. It is accessible from the Malad Railway station through the bus routes 210, 243, 270, 271, 272, 273, 281,345, 622 and 707

== Landmarks ==
Our Lady of Lourdes Church , established in 1916, is also known as Orlem Church. Many major B.E.S.T. bus routes stop here and some routes terminate here.

== Localities ==
Major zones in Orlem:

- Dominic Colony and Tank Colony
- Joe Braz Colony (J.B.C.)
- Lourdes Colony
- Baudi
- Mithchowki
- Evershine Nagar
- Somwar Bazar & Liberty Garden
- D'monte Lane

Orlem is the channel for many Mumbai beaches such as Marve Beach, Aksa Beach, Madh Island, Erangal, and Dana Pani.

== Demographics ==
Orlem was traditionally inhabited by the Bombay East Indians, Koli and SKP communities. According to a 2004 Church census, there were around 7,000 Tamil Catholics in the parish. With the huge boom of the call centre service industry in the 2000s, Orlem witnessed a large influx of young working class executives.

== Education ==
The major schools in Orlem are St. Anne's High School and Junior College, St. Anne International School, Shri Balaji/Pinnacle High International School, Carmel Of St. Joseph, and Orchids International School.

== Sports ==
Orlem is home to a vibrant sporting community, predominantly in the fields of hockey and football.

== Popular culture ==
The writer Lindsay Pereira's debut novel, Gods and Ends, is the first to be set in Orlem. It was published by Penguin Random House in March, 2021, and focuses on the Goan Catholic community, as well as the East Indian and Mangalorean population of the suburb. The book was described in The Hindu as "a stark and fearless portrayal of the Roman Catholic community in the Bombay of yore."

In the Hindi movie Merry Christmas, at the very beginning, Maria, a married women discloses to a stranger [whom she met by chance in a restaurant], that her husband had been spending the night in bed with his girl friend at Orlem.
