= Djinn Patrol on the Purple Line =

2020 novel by Deepa Anappara

- Cover of the first UK edition
- Author: Deepa Anappara
- Language: English
- Publisher: Chatto & Windus (UK); Random House (US); McClelland & Stewart (Canada); Penguin Books (India)
- Publication date: 30 January 2020 (UK 1st ed.)
- Media type: print
- Pages: 352 (UK 1st ed.)
- ISBN: 9781784743086 (UK 1st ed.)
- OCLC: 1140006998
- LC Class: PR6101.N325 D55 2020

Djinn Patrol on the Purple Line is a novel by Deepa Anappara, published in 2020. Her debut novel, it received wide praise and won the Lucy Cavendish College Fiction Prize in 2019. Djinn Patrol is shortlisted for the 2020 JCB Prize and was longlisted for the 2020 Women's Prize for Fiction. The novel won the 2021 Edgar Award for Best Novel.

== Book ==
Djinn Patrol depicts a young child who attempts to investigate a mystery involving the disappearance of children from an impoverished slum. It tells of children living in a slum in a fictional Indian city who set out to find a classmate who has disappeared. A reviewer for Kirkus compared the setting to that of Katherine Boo's Behind the Beautiful Forevers. Anappara's novel makes use of several genres, including detective fiction, mystery, satire, and Bildungsroman. A review in The New York Times noted that Djinn Patrol "announces the arrival of a literary supernova".

== Author ==
Anappara spent her early life in Palakkad, Kerala, India. She is an Indian writer and journalist. Anappara worked as a journalist in India, reporting on social issues in the state of Gujarat, and in Delhi and Mumbai. Her work has focused on studying the effects of violence and poverty, particularly on young people. Anappara wrote the novel while pursuing a master's degree in creative writing at the University of East Anglia. Djinn Patrol on the Purple Line was originally written as part of her dissertation for her Master of Arts degree. The manuscript and publication rights were sold at the Frankfurt Book Fair, and the novel was the subject of a "hard-fought auction" between multiple publishers, ultimately being sold to Chatto & Windus and Random House.

Her work has won several awards for journalism, including the Developing Asia Journalism Awards, the "Every Human has Rights" Media Awards, as well as the Sanskriti-Prabha Dutt Fellowship in Journalism. Djinn Patrol on the Purple Line was shortlisted for the JCB Prize for Literature in 2020.

Anappara is currently working towards a doctorate in historical fiction at the University of East Anglia.

== Awards and recognition ==
Some awards and recognition received by Anappara include:

- 2006: Developing Asia Journalism Award
- 2013: Second place in the Bristol Short Story Prize, for her story, 'The Breakdown'
- 2013: Asham Awards for Short Stories
- 2015: Dastaan Award for Short Stories, for her story, 'After a Hijacking'
- 2017: Bridport Peggy Chapman Andrews First Novel Award for Djinn Patrol on the Purple Line
- 2018: Lucy Cavendish Fiction Prize for Djinn Patrol on the Purple Line
- 2018: Deborah Rogers Foundation Writers Award for Djinn Patrol on the Purple Line
- 2020: JCB Prize for Literature shortlist: Djinn Patrol on the Purple Line
- 2021: Edgar Allan Poe Award for Best Novel
