= Kumar Nagarkoti =

Nepali writer (born 1974)

- कुमार नगरकोटी
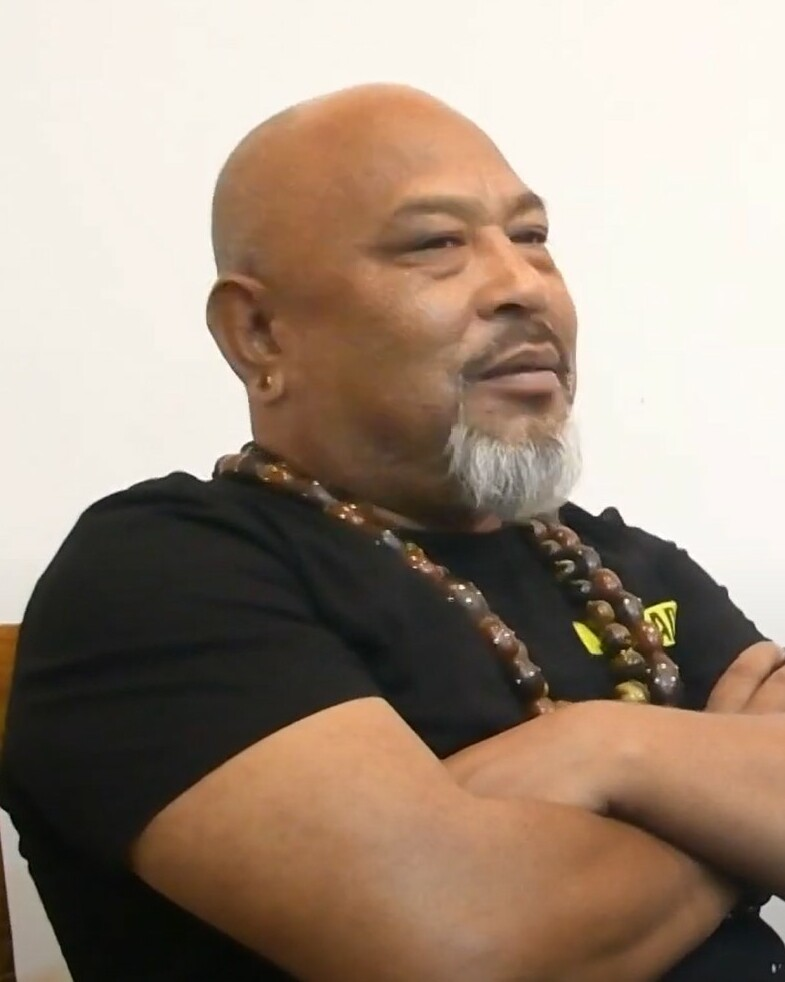
- Nagarkoti at a programme in Butwal (2019)
- Born: 2 December 1974 (age 51); Lalitpur, Nepal
- Other name: Nagarkoti
- Occupations: Writer, poet, columnist
- Notable work: Ghatmandu, Kalpa-Grantha, Mistika
- Style: Surrealism, Magical realism
- Spouse: Sabitri Karki
- Children: 1

Kumar Nagarkoti (Nepali: कुमार नगरकोटी; born 1974) is a Nepali writer, poet, dramatist, and columnist. His stories are known for their surrealistic elements and eccentric style that often mixes Nepali, English, Hindi, Nepal Bhasa, and other languages.

== Biography ==
Nagarkoti was born on 2 December 1974 (17 Mangsir 2031 BS) in Lalitpur, Nepal.

He began his literary career in 1999 with an English poem titled Sorry Buddha, I Cannot Follow You. He published his first story, Nikas, at the age of 21. The story was published in Sahakalam Sahitya, a literary paper that only printed works of established writers.

Nagarkoti's first book, Mokshanta: Kathmandu Fever, a collection of short stories, was published in 2011 by Ratna Pustak Bhandar. His second short story collection, Fossil, was published in 2013 by Nepalaya. Fossil won the 2013 Barsha Pustak (Book of the Year) award, awarded by the National Booksellers and Publishers Association of Nepal.

Nagarkoti next published a memoir titled Aksharganj in 2014. The memoir contained 30 essays with various magical realism and surrealistic elements. In 2015, he wrote a play called Coma - A Political Sex, which was staged at Shilpee Theatre and directed by the playwright Ghimire Yubaraj. The play is about a writer who goes into a coma while writing his book, because the constitution is not drafted on time.

His first novel, Mistika was published on 20 August 2015. In 2016, he published a collection of fiction and non-fiction writing titled Ghatmandu, which was shortlisted for the Padmashree Sahitya Puraskar.

A second memoir, Docha, was published in 2017. The book was not written in first person narrative as with most memoir but used animals, birds, and inanimate objects as narrators.

In 2018, he made a cameo in the Nepali film Lal Purja. The same year, he also published Gya, a novel, which was shortlisted for the prestigious Madan Puraskar the same year.

In 2019, his second play, Bathtub, was staged at Shilpee Theatre, once again directed by Ghimire Yubaraj. The play starred veteran actor Neer Shah and writers Brajesh Khanal and Bhushita Vasistha.

In 2021, published his tenth book, Kalpa-Grantha. The book is an example of ergodic literature consisting of 63 experimental tales including typographs, postcards, screen plays, etc. The book was produced by Book Hill Publications and only sold to preorders as a limited edition release. A first for Nepali literature and Nepali publication, the book was criticised for its cost and limited release. The book was also shortlisted for Madan Puraskar but lost to Limbuwanko Etihasik Dastavej Sangraha by Bhagi Raj Ingnam.

In 2023, Nagarkoti published Jogiyana, another memoir. Jogiyana was shortlisted for the Padmashree Sahitya Puraskar 2080.

Nagarkoti is also a prolific poet who regularly performs his own poetry.

He describes himself as a "fiction designer" rather than a fiction writer.

== Notable works ==
Books

Title	Genre	Publication date	Publisher	Note
Mokshanta: Kathmandu Fever	Short stories	2011	Ratna Pustak Bhandari (first edition); Book Hill Publications	Debut book
Fossil	Short stories	2013	Nepalaya Publication (first edition), subsequently Book Hill Publications	Winner of Barsha Pustak Award 2013
Aksharganj	Memoir	2014	Book Hill Publications	
Mistika	Novel	2015	Book Hill Publications	
Ghatmandu	Collected works	2016	Book Hill Publications	
Docha	Memoir	2017	Book Hill Publications	
Gya	Novel	2018	Book Hill Publications	Shortlisted for Madan Puraskar 2075 BS
Kalpa-Grantha	Short stories; ergodic literature	2021	Book Hill Publications	Shortlisted for Madan Puraskar 2077 BS
Jogiyana	Memoir	2023	Book Hill Publications	Shortlisted for Padmashree Sahitya Puraskar 2080 BS

Plays

Title	Publication date	Role	Director
Coma - A Political Sex	2015	Playwright	Ghimire Yubaraj
Bath-tub	2019	Playwright	Ghimire Yubaraj

Films

Title	Release date	Role	Character	Director
Lal Purja	2018	Actor	Sadhu (a mystic)	Nigam Shrestha

== Personal life ==
Nagarkoti is married to Sabitri Karki. They currently reside in Balkumari, Lalitpur with their son Grishmil Nagarkoti.

== See also ==
- Nayan Raj Pandey
- Buddhisagar
- Saru Bhakta
