= JCB Prize =

Indian literary award

JCB Prize for Literature
- Type: Literary Fiction
- Awarded for: Distinguished work of fiction by an Indian writer (original English novel or translated fiction).
- Sponsored by: JCB
- Country: India India
- Reward: ₹2,500,000 (US$27,000)
- Established: 2018
- First award: 2018

Highlights
- Total awarded: 5
- First winner: Benyamin (2018)
- Most recent winner: Upamanyu Chatterjee (2024)
- Website: www.thejcbprize.org

JCB Prize for Literature was an Indian literary award established in 2018. It was awarded annually with ₹2,500,000 (US$27,000) prize to a distinguished work of fiction by an Indian writer working in English or translated fiction by an Indian writer. The winners will be announced each November with shortlists in October and longlists in September. It has been called "India's most valuable literature prize". Rana Dasgupta is the founding Literary Director of the JCB Prize. In 2020, Mita Kapur was appointed as the new Literary Director.

The JCB Literature Foundation was established to maintain the award. It is funded by the English construction manufacturing group JCB. Publishers are allowed, per imprint, to enter two novels originally written in English and two novels translated into English from another language. Celebrated writers like Geetanjali Shree, Perumal Murugan, Geet Chaturvedi, Benyamin, and Upamanyu Chatterjee have all been featured on the longlists and shortlists of this prestigious award.

== Honourees ==
Winners indicated with a blue ribbon.

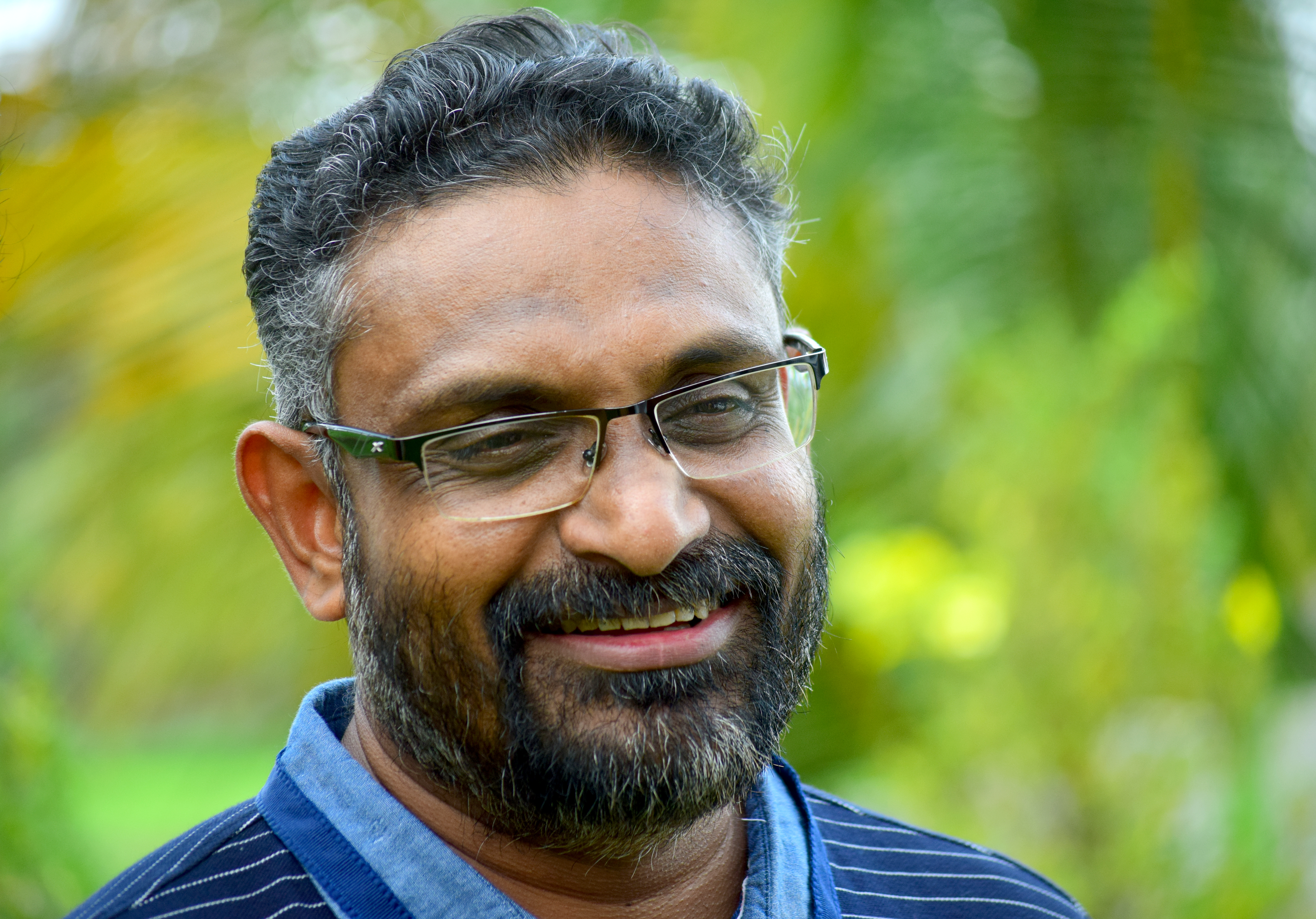
Benyamin won the prize for the year 2018 for his novel Jasmine Days, originally written in Malayalam and translated into English by Shahnaz Habib.

=== 2018 ===
The inaugural JCB Prize longlist was announced in September 2018. The 5-member shortlist was announced October 2018. The winner was announced October 25, 2018.

- Amitabha Bagchi, Half the Night is Gone
- Benyamin, Jasmine Days (Translated from Malayalam by Shahnaz Habib)
- Perumal Murugan, Poonachi (Translated from Tamil by N Kalyan Raman)
- Anuradha Roy, All the Lives We Never Lived
- Shubhangi Swarup, Latitudes of Longing

=== 2019 ===
The longlist was announced September 2019. The five-member shortlist was announced November 2019. The winner was announced November 5, 2019.

- Roshan Ali, Ib's Endless Search for Satisfaction
- Manoranjan Byapari, There's Gunpowder in the Air (Translated from Bengali by Arunava Sinha)
- Perumal Murugan, A Lonely Harvest and Trial by Silence (Both translated from Tamil by Aniruddhan Vasudevan)
- Hansda Sowvendra Shekhar, My Father's Garden
- Madhuri Vijay, The Far Field

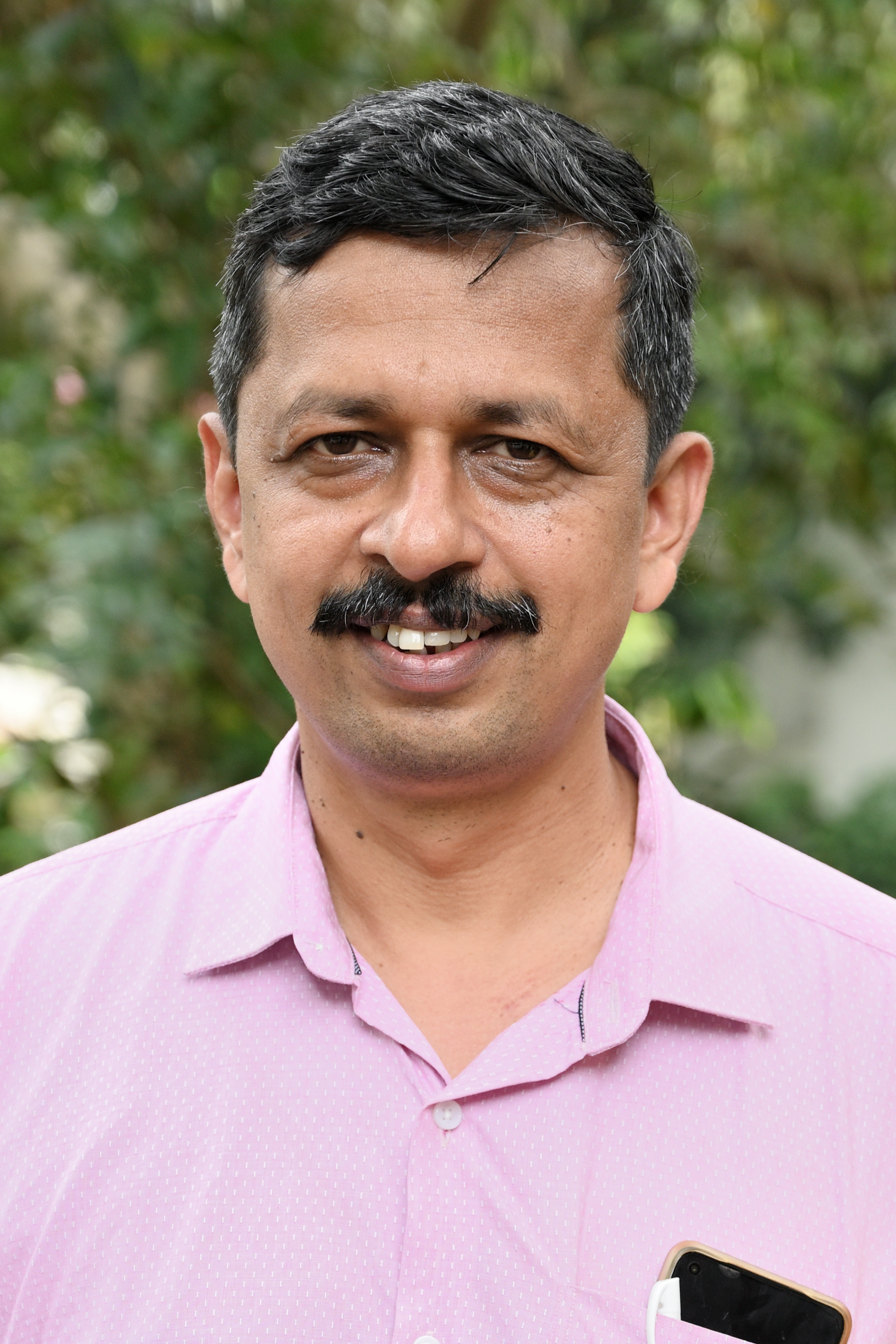
S. Hareesh won the prize for the year 2020 for his novel Moustache, originally written in Malayalam and translated into English by Jayasree Kalathi.

=== 2020 ===
The longlist was announced in September, 2020. The shortlist was announced on 25 September 2020. The winner was announced on November 7, 2020.

- Deepa Anappara, Djinn Patrol on the Purple Line
- Samit Basu, Chosen Spirits
- Dharini Bhaskar, These, Our Bodies, Possessed by Light
- S. Hareesh, Moustache (Translated from Malayalam by Jayasree Kalathil)
- Annie Zaidi, Prelude to a Riot

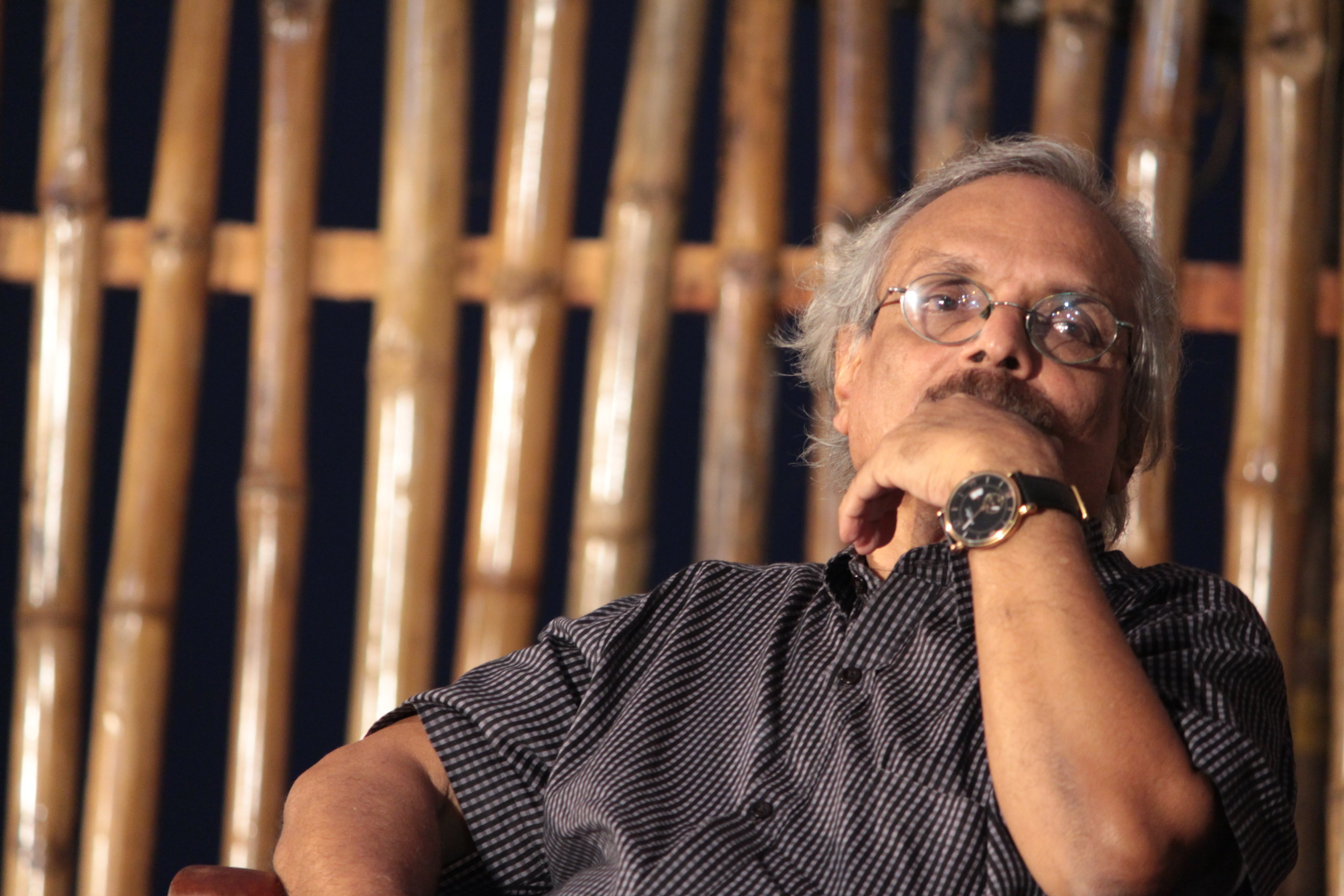
M. Mukundan won the prize for the year 2021 for his novel Delhi: A Soliloquy, originally written in Malayalam and translated into English by Fathima EV and Nandakumar K.

=== 2021 ===
The longlist was announced in September, 2021. The shortlist was announced on October 4, 2021. The winner was announced on November 13, 2021.

- VJ James, Anti-Clock (Translated from the Malayalam by Ministhy S)
- Daribha Lyndem, Name Place Animal Thing
- Shabir Ahmad Mir, The Plague Upon Us
- M Mukundan, Delhi: A Soliloquy (Translated from the Malayalam by Fathima EV and Nandakumar K)
- Lindsay Pereira, Gods and Ends

=== 2022 ===
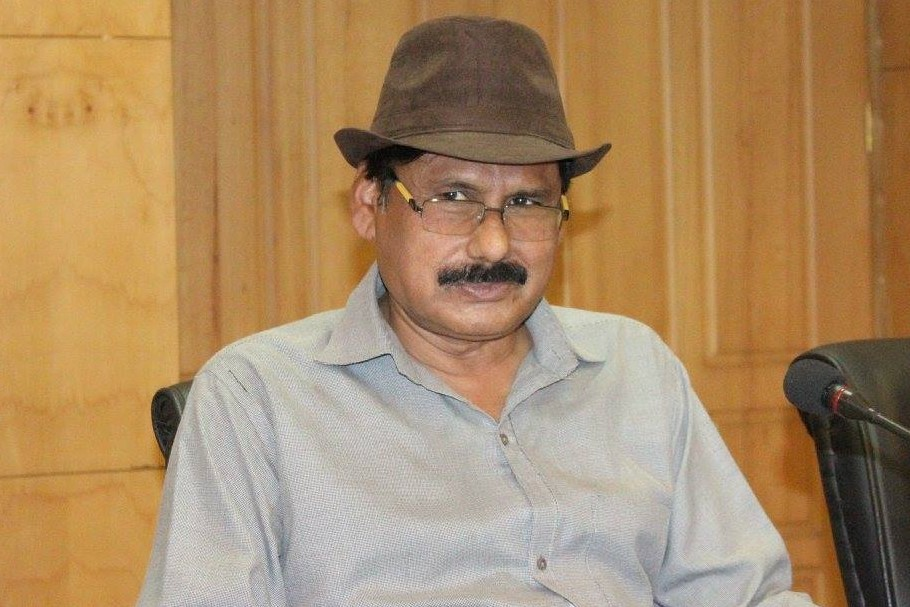
Khalid Jawed won the prize for the year 2022 for his novel The Paradise of Food, originally written in Urdu and translated into English by Baran Farooqi.

The longlist was announced on 3 September 2022. The shortlist was announced on 21 October 2022. For the first time in five years, all five books on the shortlist were translated books. The winner was announced on 19 November 2022.

- Manoranjan Byapari, Imaan (Translated from the Bengali by Arunava Sinha)
- Chuden Kabimo, Song of the Soil (Translated from the Nepali by Ajit Baral)
- Khalid Jawed, The Paradise of Food (Translated from the Urdu by Baran Farooqi)
- Geetanjali Shree, Tomb of Sand (Translated from the Hindi by Daisy Rockwell)
- Sheela Tomy, Valli (Translated from the Malayalam by Jayasree Kalathil)

=== 2023 ===
- Tejaswini Apte-Rahm, The Secret of More
- Manoranjan Byapari, The Nemesis (Translated from the Bengali by V. Ramaswamy)
- Perumal Murugan, Fire Bird (Translated from the Tamil by Janani Kannan)
- Vikramjit Ram, Mansur
- Manoj Rupda, I Named My Sister Silence (Translated from the Hindi by Hansda Sowvendra Shekhar)

=== 2024 ===
- Sharankumar Limbale, Sanatan (Translated by Paromita Sengupta into English from the Hindi translation of the original Marathi)
- Upamanyu Chatterjee, Lorenzo Searches for the Meaning of Life
- Saharu Nusaiba Kannanari, Chronicle of an Hour and a Half
- Sakyajit Bhattacharya, The One Legged (Translated from the Bengali by Rituparna Mukherjee)
- Sandhya Maria, Maria, Just Maria (Translated from the Malayalam by Jayasree Kalathil)
