= Song of the Soil =

2018 novel by Chuden Kabimo

Song of the soil
- First edition (Nepali)
- Author: Chuden Kabimo
- Original title: Faatsung (फातसुङ)
- Language: Nepali
- Genre: Historical fiction
- Published: 2019
- Publisher: FinePrint Publication (Nepal, Nepali and English); Sambodhan Publication (India, Nepali); Rachna Books (India, English); Balestier Press (UK, English); Monfakira (India, Bengali); Vani Prakashan (India, Hindi)
- Publication place: India, Nepal
- Media type: Print (paperback)
- Pages: 150
- Preceded by: 1986

Song of the Soil (Original title: Faatsung; Nepali: फातसुङ) is a 2019 Nepali novel by Chuden Kabimo. The novel is based on the Gorkhaland movement revolution that took place during 1980s in the northern part of West Bengal. The Nepali edition of the novel was initially published in 2019 by FinePrint Publication in Nepal and Sambodhan Publication in India.

Kabimo, a writer from Kalimpong district, is the winner of the Yuva Puraskar for Nepali language 2018 for 1986—a short story collection centering around the Gorkhaland movement issue.

== Synopsis ==
The original title Faatsung translates to 'story of the soil' In Lepcha language. Kabimo belongs to the Lepcha community, an ethnic group indigenous to eastern Nepal, Darjeeling, Kalimpong and Sikkim region. The story revolves around the friendship of an unnamed narrator with his friend Norden, on the backdrop of the movement.

One day, the narrator receives the news Ripden's death in a recent earthquake and decides to go back to his hometown in rural part of Nepali speaking region of West Bengal. As the narrator is going back to his hometown, he recalls his childhood with his friend. The narrator and Ripden are studying in a primary school, when one day Norden decides to go find his lost father, Norden. The narrator and Ripden then run away from their village to another village named Lolay, where they have heard Norden's friend lived. During the search of Norden, they come across a man called Nasim, who tell them the story of Norden and his involvement in the Gorkhaland movement of 1986.

== Reception ==
Charisma K. Lepcha in her review of the Nepali edition for Harvard–Yenching Institute wrote, “Written in a Darjeelingay style of Nepali, Kabimu’s voice is fresh and modern bringing back poignant memories of an era gone by.” Chitra Ahanthem in her review for Scroll.in of the English translation praised the book for its political and personal intimacy saying, “...it breathes an intimacy into fiction that is both political and personal.”. East Mojo, a digital news media platform focusing in the Northeast region of India, gave the book four stars (out of five) for its story and 4.5 stars for the translation, in its review of the English translation.

The book was shortlisted for Madan Puraskar, 2075 BS (c. 2018-2019), an prestigious award of Nepali literature.

The English translation of the novel was shortlisted for the JCB Prize, 2022. The shortlist was announced on 21 October 2022. On 3 September 2022, it was longlisted for JCB Prize, 2022. It is the first–ever book, originally written in Nepali language, to be listed for the award.

== Translations ==
The novel was translated into Bengali, with the same title as the original Nepali edition, by Samik Chakraborty, in October 2019.

In October 2021,the English translation of the novel was published. The book was translated by Ajit Baral and was published by FinePrint Publication in Nepal, Rachna Books in India and Balestier Press in the United Kingdom.

The Hindi edition of the novel, titled as Faatsung—Kahaani Mitti Ki, was published in February 2023 by Vani Prakashan, India. The novel was translated from Nepali to Hindi by Namrata Chaturvedi, an English literature professor at Zakir Husain Delhi College.

== See also ==
- Karnali Blues
- Basain
