= M. Mukundan =

Indian author

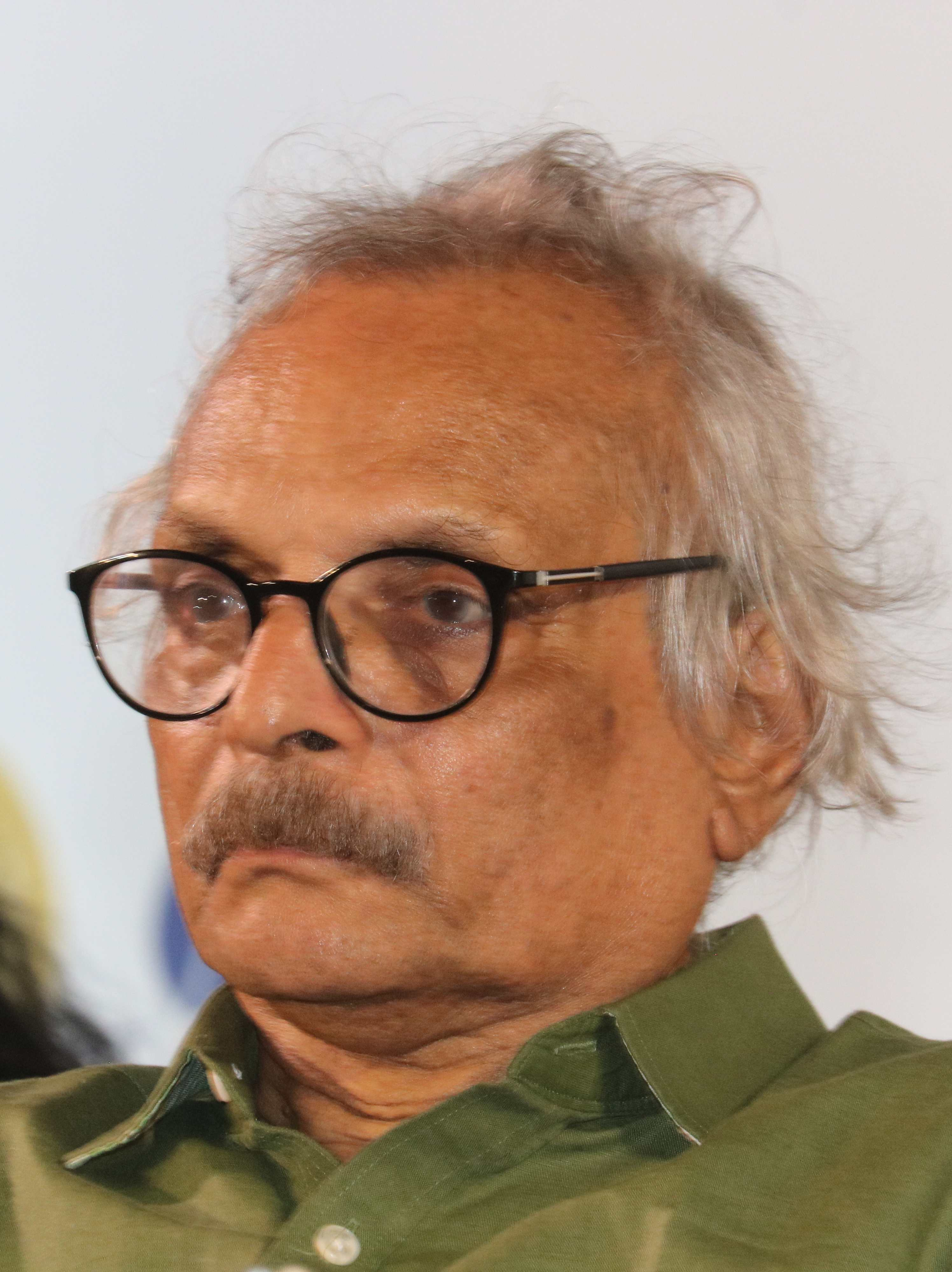
- Born: Maniyambath Mukundan; 10 September 1942 (age 84); Mahe, French India
- Citizenship: Indian
- Occupations: Writer; diplomat
- Writing career
- Period: 1961 – present
- Notable works: Mayyazhippuzhayude Theerangalil; Delhi Gadhakal; Daivathinte Vikrithikal
- Notable awards: Kerala Sahitya Akademi Award (1973); Sahitya Akademi Award (1992); Chevalier des Arts et des Lettres (1998); Crossword Book Award (2006); Ezhuthachan Puraskaram (2018); JCB Prize (2021)

Maniyambath Mukundan (born 10 September 1942) is an Indian author of Malayalam literature and a former diplomat. He worked as a cultural attaché at the Embassy of France in Delhi from 1961 to 2004, while concurrently working as an author. Many of his early works are set in Mahe (Mayyazhi), his homeland, which earned him the moniker Mayyazhiyude Kathakaaran (Mayyazhi's storyteller). He is known to be one of the pioneers of modernity in Malayalam literature. Some of his best known works include Mayyazhippuzhayude Theerangalil, Daivathinte Vikrithikal, Kesavante Vilapangal, and Pravasam.

He has received several literary awards, including Sahitya Akademi Award, Kerala Sahitya Akademi Award, Vayalar Award, Crossword Book Award, JCB Prize, and the Ezhuthachan Puraskaram (the highest literary award of the Government of Kerala). He is also a recipient of the Chevalier des Arts et des Lettres of the Government of France.

== Early life ==
Mukundan was born on 10 September 1942 at Mahe, then a French overseas territory and now a part of the union territory of Puducherry in South India. Mukundan worked as a cultural attaché at the New Delhi office of the Embassy of France in Delhi from 1961 to 2004. He concurrently worked as an author.

== Literary career ==
His first literary work was a short story published in 1961 while the first novel, Delhi was published in 1969. Mukundan has so far published 12 novels which include his later works such as Adithyanum Radhayum Mattu Chilarum, Oru Dalit Yuvathiyude Kadanakatha, Kesavante Vilapangal and Nritham and ten collections of short stories (which totals 171 in numbers till 2012). Adithyanum Radhayum Mattu Chilarum is a fictional story which dethrone the time from the narrative, it gives the readers a new method of writing. Oru Dalit Yuvathiyude Kadanakatha reveals how Vasundhara, an actress has been insulted in the course of acting due to some unexpected situations. It proclaims the postmodern message that martyrs are created not only through ideologies, but through art also. Kesavante Vilapangal (Kesavan's Lamentations) one of his later works tells the story of a writer Kesavan who writes a novel on a child named Appukkuttan who grows under the influence of E. M. S. Namboodiripad. Daivathinte Vikrithikal has been translated into English and published By Penguin Books India.

Three of his novels were made into feature films in Malayalam. He also co-wrote the screenplay of Daivathinte Vikrithikal (1992) for which he won the Kerala State Film Award for Best Story. His novel Pravasam (sojourn in non-native land) is the story of a Malayali whose journeys carry him around the world. Delhi Gadhakal (Tales from Delhi), a novel published in November 2011 is his recollections in India's capital city, New Delhi.

Mukundan served as the president of Kerala Sahitya Akademi from October 2006 until March 2010.

== Awards and honours ==
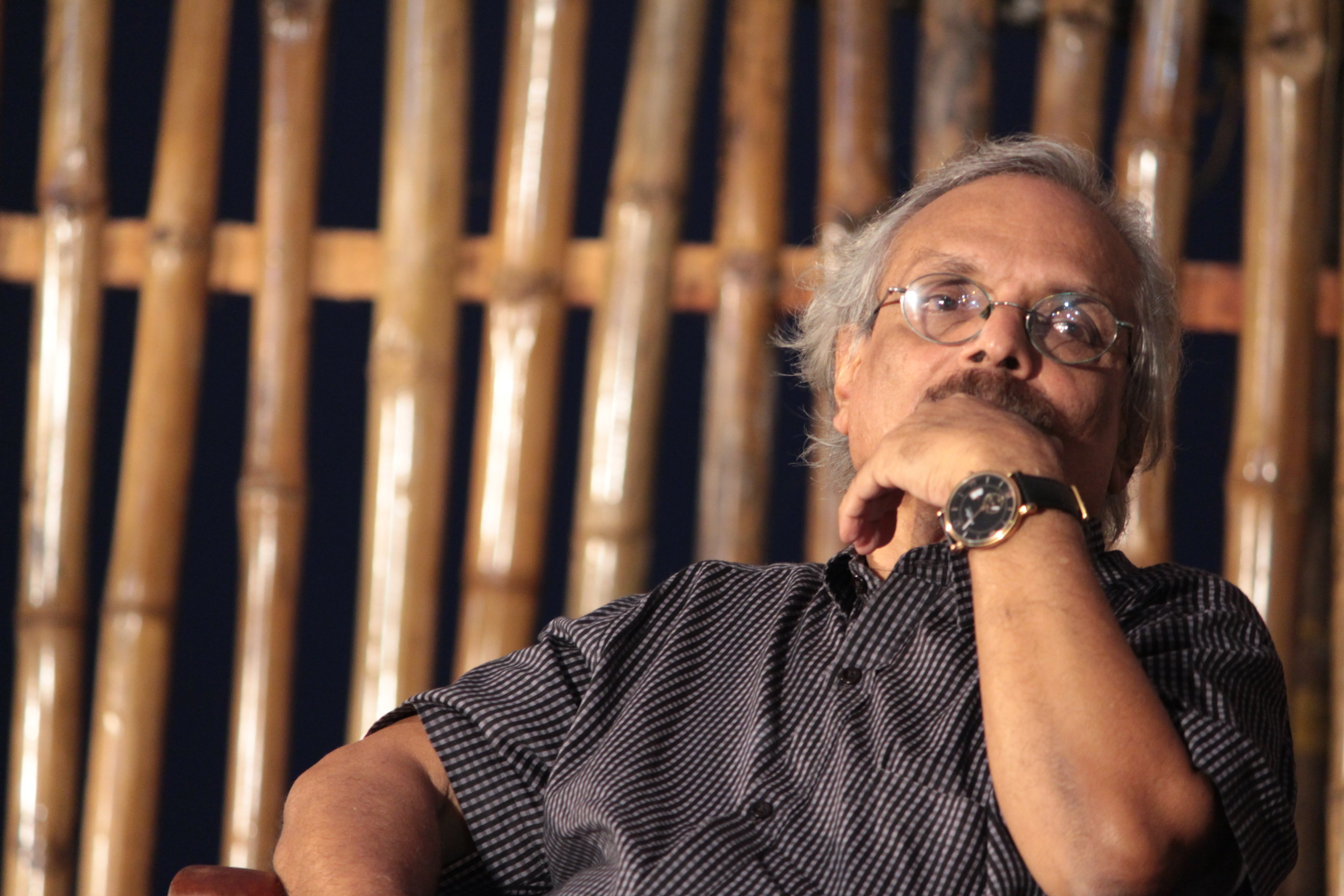

Mukundan received Kerala Sahitya Akademi Award for Novel in 1973 for Ee Lokam Athiloru Manushyan. This was followed by Sahitya Akademi Award in 1992 when Daivathinte Vikrithikal (God's Mischief) was selected for the award; the novel also received the N.V. Puraskaram. He received two honours in 1998, Chevalier des Arts et des Lettres of the Government of France and the Muttathu Varkey Award. He received the Vayalar Award in 2003, for Kesavante Vilapangal (Kesavan's Lamentations) and three years later, the English translation of Kesavan's Lamentations received the 2006 Crossword Book Award. The Government of Kerala awarded him their highest literary honour Ezhuthachan Puraskaram in 2018. He also received the Kerala Sahitya Akademi Fellowship the same year. He is also a recipient of M. P. Paul Award. In 2017, he received the T. K. Ramakrishnan Award, awarded as part of the Abu Dhabi Sakthi Awards, for his overall contribution.

Mukundan received the JCB prize for literature in 2021 for his book Delhi: A Soliloquy. His novel Nritham Cheyyunna Kudakal received the Basheer Award in 2022. In 2023, he received the Thakazhi Award. His most recent novel Ningal won the Padmarajan Award in 2023.

== Works ==
=== Novels ===
Year	Title	Publisher	Ref.
1969	Aakashathinu Chuvattil (Beneath the Sky)	Kottayam: SPCS	
1969	Delhi	Thrissur: Current Books	
1970	Avilayile Sooryodayam (Sunrise at Avila)	Thrissur: Current Books	
1972	Haridwaril Mani Muzhangunnu (Bells are Tolling in Haridwar)	Kottayam: NBS	
1972	Ee Lokam Athiloru Manushyan (This World, In it a Man)	Calicut: Poorna	
1974	Mayyazhippuzhayude Theerangalil (On the Banks of River Mayyazhi)	Kottayam: SPCS	
1975	Kootam Thetti Meyunnavar	Calicut: Poorna	
1976	Oru School Master	Kottayam: Priyamvada	
1977	Seetha	Kottayam: SPCS	
1982	Ravum Pakalum (Day and Night)	Kottayam: SPCS	
1984	Kili Vannu Vilichappol (When the Bird Came Calling)	Kottayam: DC Books	
1989	Daivathinte Vikrithikal (God's Mischief)	Kottayam: DC Books	
1993	Adityanum Radhayum Pinne Mattu Chilarum (Adityan, Radha and the Others)	Kottayam: DC Books	
1996	Oru Dalit Yuvathiyude Kadanakatha (The Tragic Story of a Young Dalit Woman)	Kottayam: DC Books	
1999	Kesavante Vilapangal (Kesavan's Lamentations)	Kottayam: DC Books	
2000	Nrittam (The Dance)	Kottayam: DC Books	
2005	Pulayappattu (The Song of the Pulayas)	Calicut: Mathrubhumi	
2008	Pravasam (Exile)	Kottayam: DC Books	
2011	Delhi Gadhakal (Tales from Delhi)	Kottayam: DC Books	
2015	Kuda Nannakkunna Choyi (Choyi, Who Mends Umbrellas)	Kottayam: DC Books	
2017	Nrutham Cheyyunna Kutakal (Dancing Umbrellas)	Kottayam: DC Books	
2023	Ningal (You)	Kottayam: DC Books	

=== Novelettes ===
Year	Title	Publisher	Ref.
1979	Charlie Master	Calicut: Poorna	
1986	Aval Paranju Varoo (collection of novelettes)	Calicut: Malayalam Pub.	
1989	Nagnanaya Thampuran (The Naked Lord)	Calicut: Malayalam Pub.	
1989	Madamma	Calicut: Poorna	
1993	Ezhamathe Poovu (The Seventh Flower)	Kottayam: NBS	

=== Short story collections ===
Year	Title	Publisher	Ref.
1967	Veedu (Home)	Thrissur: Current Books	
1969	Nadiyum Thoniyum	Thrissur: Current Books	
1971	Vesyakale Ningalkkorambalam	Kottayam: SPCS	
1973	Anchara Vayasulla Kutti	Trivandrum: Navadhara	
1977	Ezhamathe Poovu (collection of 11 stories)	Calicut: Poorna	
1982	Thiranjedutha Kathakal (Selected Stories)	Kottayam: DC Books	
1983	Hridayavathiyaya Penkutty	Konni: Venus Book Depot	
1985	Thattathippenninte Kalyanam (The Marriage of the Goldsmith's Daughter)	Kottayam: Current Books	
1988	Thevidissikkili (The Whoring Bird)	Kottayam: Current Books	
1990	Kallanum Polisum (The Thief and the Police)	Kottayam: Current Books	
1990	Kathavaseshan (new edition of Veedu)	Kottayam: Current Books	
1994	Russia	Kottayam: DC Books	
1995	Kannadiyude Kazcha (The Eye of the Mirror)	Kottayam: DC Books	
2004	Pavadayum Bikiniyum	Kottayam: DC Books	
2004	Nagaravum Sthreeyum	Calicut: Mathrubhumi	
2008	Mukundante Kathakal	Thrissur: Current Books	
2009	Dinosarukalute Kalam	Kottayam: DC Books	
2009	Nattumpuram	Kannur: Kairali Books	
2009	Mukundante Kathakal Sampoornam	Kottayam: DC Books	
2013	Thanner Kudiyante Thandu	Calicut: Mathrubhumi	

=== Non-fiction ===
- Enthanu Aadhunikatha? (Calicut: Poorna, 1976)

=== Memoirs ===
- Anubhavam Ormma Yathra (Calicut: Olive, 2014)

=== Works translated ===
- 1999. On the Banks of the Mayyazhi. Trans. Gita Krishnankutty. Chennai: Manas.
- 2002. Sur les rives du fleuve Mahé. Trans. Sophie Bastide-Foltz. Actes Sud.
- 2002. God's Mischief. Trans. Prema Jayakumar. Delhi: Penguin.
- 2004. Adityan, Radha, and Others. Trans. C Gopinathan Pillai. New Delhi: Sahitya Akademi.
- 2005. The Train that Had Wings: Selected Short Stories of M. Mukundan. trans. Donald R. Davis, Jr. Ann Arbor: University of Michigan Press.
- 2006. Kesavan's Lamentations. Trans. A.J. Thomas. New Delhi: Rupa.
- 2007. Nrittam: A Malayalam Novel. Trans. Mary Thundyil Mathew. Lewiston, New York: Edwin Mellen Press.
