= Mayyazhippuzhayude Theerangalil =

Novel by M. Mukundan

- 41st anniversary edition cover
- Author: M. Mukundan
- Language: Malayalam
- Genre: Fiction
- Publisher: DC Books
- Publication date: 1974
- Publication place: India
- English publication date: 1999
- Pages: 304
- ISBN: 978-8-171-30231-4

Mayyazhippuzhayude Theerangalil (On the Banks of the Mayyazhi) is a Malayalam-language novel by M. Mukundan. The novel vividly and mystically describes the historic political and social background of the former French colony of Mahe (Mayyazhi). The novel was translated into Tamil, English,Hindi and French (with these three versions also winning several awards).

== Historic background ==
The novel is based on the lives of a few families in the enclave of Mahe. The new generation in Mahe wanted to merge the French enclave with India. The older people were loyal to the French rulers and believed in continuing colonial rule. Two people, Kanaran and Dasan, lead the fight against the French. The novel includes finer details about the colonial nature of French rule in Mahe. The streets of Mahe with French names revoke an old, historic charm. There is a Christian church and many Hindu temples mentioned in the story. It also describes the first revolution in which the activists removed the national flag from one of the government offices. This revolution was certainly a failure as the French navy came, and the activists fled across the Mahe Bridge. However, the second and final revolution was successful, and the French rulers escaped by ship.

== Plot summary ==
The protagonist in the novel is a young man named Dasan who was born in French Mahe and educated in Pondicherry. Even though he was offered a job in the French administration and assistance for higher education in Paris, he instead joins the freedom movement led by Gandhian Kanaran and is attracted by communist ideology. A girl, Chandrika, falls in love with him, but he is unable to promise her a married life because of his commitment to the revolution. A French court sentences Dasan to 12 years of imprisonment, but Dasan escapes captivity by walking across to the Indian Union. Very soon, he comes back to Mahe, leading a group of volunteers before freeing Mahe from foreign rule. The French national flag is removed and the Indian national flag is hoisted on government buildings. Despite being a local hero, Dasan struggles for his livelihood as he refuses to accept regular employment and join the mainstream lifestyle. His girlfriend is forced by her parents to marry another man and hence, commits suicide. Dasan also follows her way to reach the abode of the soul on the Velliyamkallu island on the Mahe coast.

== Characters ==
- Dasan, the protagonist.
- Chandrika, Dasan's girlfriend.
- Kunjananthan, teacher of Dasan and a revolutionary.
- Kanaretttan, a freedom fighter.
- Mooppan, a French administrator (Big Sayiv).
- Unni Nair, a French loyalist and bar owner.
- Damu Writer, Dasan's father.
- Pappan, a revolutionary.
- Vasootty, Dasan's friend.
- Kunhichirutha, a courtesan.
- Karunan, a French officer.
- Kurumbi Amma, grandmother of Dasan and a French loyalist.
- Leslie, a French magistrate.
- Missy, Leslie's wife.
- Gastohn, Leslie and Missy couple's only son
- Achu, the village appy, Ghirija’s husband and a local hero.
- Chekku Mooppar, the mayor.
- David, a French officer and Kunhichirutha's love interest.
- Kowsu, Dasan's mother.
- Kunjakkan, the lamp-lighter.
- Kunjanan, a French loyalist.
- Bharathan, Chandrika's father.
- Leela, Chandrika's mother.
- Ghirija, Dasan’s sister.

dhananjay the ravanan

== French named streets of Mahe ==
- Rue de la Prison
- Rue du Gouvernement
- Rue de l'église (Church Road)
- Rue de la Residence

== Translations ==
- Malayalam:
- Tamil: 1998. Mayyazhi Karaiyoram. Trans. Rudra Thulasidhas (A) Ilambharathi. National Book Trust.
- English: 1999. On the Banks of the Mayyazhi. Trans. Gita Krishnankutty. Chennai: Manas.
- Hindi: 1997. Mayyazhi Nadi Ke Kinare. Translated by Sudhanshu Chaturvedi. New Delhi: National Book Trust.
- French: 2002. Sur les rives du fleuve Mahé. Trans. Sophie Bastide-Foltz. Actes Sud.Win

== In popular culture ==
- The characters of the novel are depicted in the form of a stone mural on Mahe Walk in Mahe.
- BONJOUR MAYYAZHI, a Malayalam-language short film, tells the story of the novel’s characters coming back and questioning the novelist.
