= Benyamin (writer) =

Indian writer

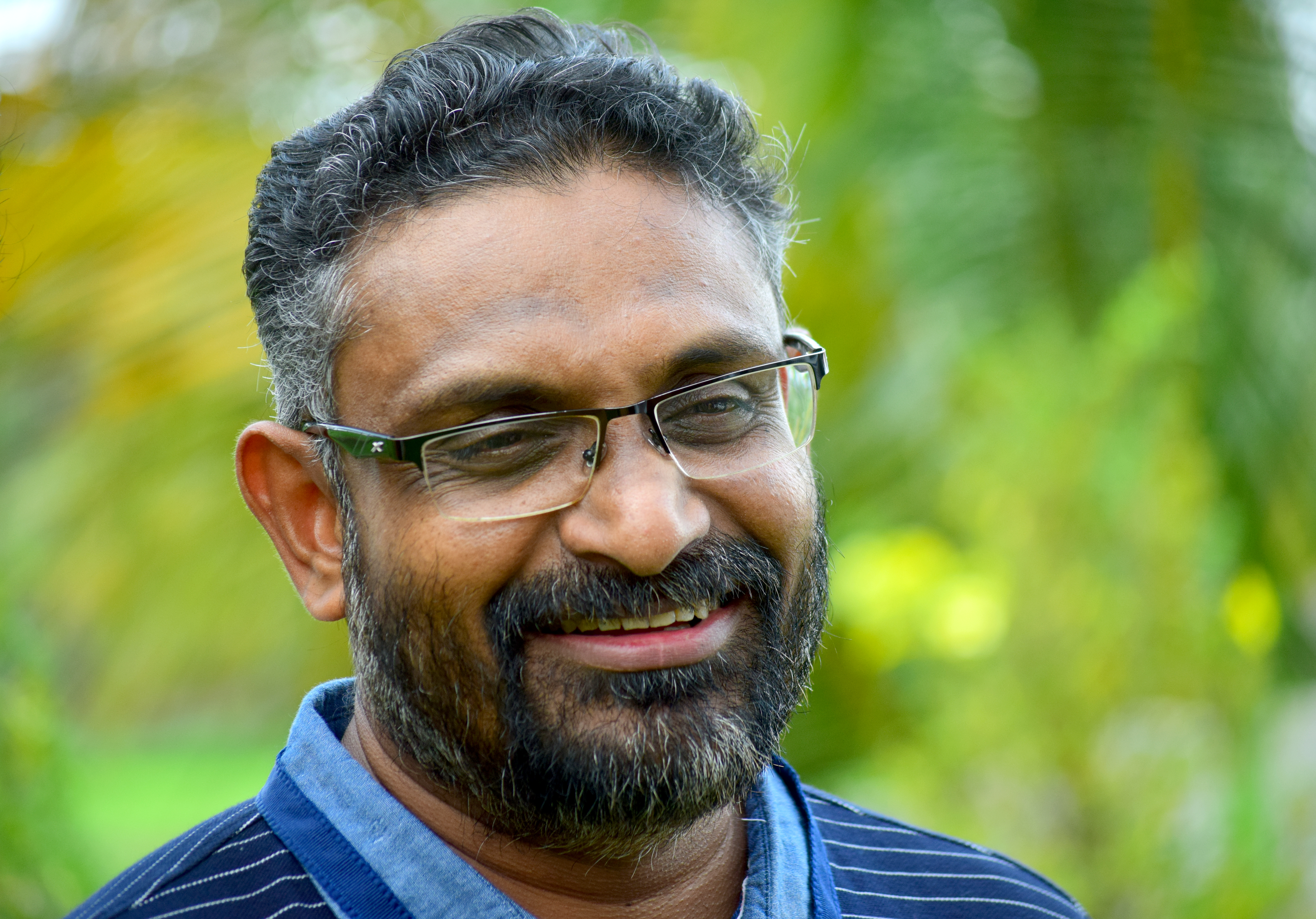
- Benyamin in July 2018
- Born: Benny Daniel; 18 May 1971 (age 55); Kulanada, Pathanamthitta, Kerala, India
- Occupations: Novelist; Screenwriter
- Spouse: Asha Mathew (m. 2000)
- Children: Rohan Benny; Kezia Ann Benny
- Writing career
- Pen name: Benyamin
- Language: Malayalam
- Period: 2000 - present
- Notable works: Aadujeevitham; Manja Veyil Maranangal
- Notable awards: Kerala Sahitya Akademi Award; JCB Prize; Vayalar Award

Benny Daniel (born on 18 May 1971), better known by his pen name Benyamin, is an Indian writer in Malayalam from Kerala. He is the author of about thirty books in various genres – from short stories to novels and memoirs. For his novel Goat Days (Aadujeevitham), he won the Abu Dhabi Sakthi Award, Kerala Sahitya Akademi Award and JCB Prize, and was shortlisted for the Man Asian Literary Prize. The novel Manthalirile 20 Communist Varshangal won the Vayalar Award in 2021.

Apart from literature he ventured Malayalam film industry in 2023 as a co-writer of the Malayalam film Christy with the writer G.R. Indugopan, which marked his debut as a screenwriter. His magnum opus novel Aadujeevitham has been adapted by director Blessy into a film,The Goat Life, which was released on 28 March 2024.

== Early life ==
Benyamin was born on May 18, 1971, in the Njettoor area of Kulanada village, near Pandalam, in Pathanamthitta district in the southern part of Kerala.After living in Bahrain from 1992 to 2013, he returned to Kerala. He also spent some time in Australia. At present, he resides in his Mannil Puthenveedu home in Njettoor.

== Personal life ==
Benyamin married Asha Mathew on 2 January 2000 and they have two children Rohan Benny and Kezia Ann Benny.

=== Family Tree ===
Mannil Puthanveedu Family

Benyamin (Benny Daniel)	Asha Mathew
Rohan Benny	Kezia Ann Benny

== Education ==
He had his primary education at Manthuka Government U.P. School. Later, he completed his pre-degree from Catholicate College, Pathanamthitta, and earned a diploma from Nanjappa Institute of Technology in Coimbatore.

== Writing Career ==
In 2000, Euthanasia was the first short story collection in Malayalam literature.

=== Goat Days (2008) ===
Goat Days (Aadujeevitham), his most famous novel, portrays the life of Najeeb, an Indian labourer and how he survives the hardships and tortures in Saudi Arabia. It is used as a textbook at Kerala University, Calicut University, Bharathiar University, Pondicherry University and 10th standard for Kerala State syllabus. It was a magnum opus and a turning point work of Bennyamin in his writing career. The Goat Life is a film adaptation of this novel directed by Blessy.

=== Yellow Lights Of Death (2011) ===
Yellow Lights Of Death (Manjaveyil Maranagal) describes that once the author unexpectedly receives half of a story by email from a young man named Christy Andraper. At a seaside cafe, two friends, Christy and Jesinta, witness a murder. Christy discovers that his classmate Senthil was shot. But the police say that no such crime has been committed so far. The hospital authorities say he had a heart attack. Christy begins to suspect a conspiracy and begins to investigate. It's a beautiful work that leaves the readers to be confused as to whether it was a real incident or a fictional event, keeping it a mystery from start to the end.

=== Jasmine Days (2014) ===
Jasmine Days (Mullappoo Niramulla Pakalukal) tells the story of a young woman Sameera Parvin who moves to a middle eastern city and finds herself in the middle of a revolution. It revolves around the Jasmine Revolution that sprang up in December 2010 and was quelled by January 2011. The English translation of the novel won the inaugural JCB Prize for Literature, the richest literary award in the country. The jury chairperson Vivek Shanbag called the novel "brilliant and intense".

=== Tharakans Grandhavari (2022) ===
Tharakans Grandhavari (The Chronicles of Tharakan) is a unique experiment in narrative style as well as in production and publication. The plot revolves around the life of Mathu Tharakan and is narrated through 120 incidents. The book is published as 120 loose cards and the readers are given the choice to dictate the narrative. Each copy of the book is uniquely assembled such that each copy is a distinct permutation of the many possibilities in which the novel could be read.

=== Christy (2023) ===
Beyond novel writing, In 2023, he made his debut as a screenwriter by co-writing the script of the film Christy with novelist G. R. Indugopan and he also played a small character in the film. Also, the screenplay of this film is written by both of them has been published in book form by Manorama Books, which was launched during the audio launch of the film.

== Film Career ==
Benyamin took his first step into cinema through the early discussions about adapting 2008 published novel, Aadujeevitham into a film. Many renowned filmmakers, including Lal Jose and Adoor Gopalakrishnan, approached him to make the adaptation, but he eventually joined hands with acclaimed director Blessy.

Despite having a deep connection and love for literature and cinema, he did not write the screenplay for Aadujeevitham and instead completely entrusted that responsibility to director Blessy, whom he considered more accomplished in the language of cinema than himself. In 2018, the shooting of Aadujeevitham finally began, marking Benyamin’s true entry into the world of cinema. When the film released in 2024, it quickly achieved massive acceptance, just like the novel itself.

Yet, despite being one of the main creative spirits behind Aadujeevitham, he remained more like a shadow during the writing phase. Before the release of Aadujeevitham, Benyamin—who generally kept a distance from screenplay writing—stepped into the field through the film Christy, co-writing the script with another writer, G. R. Indugopan, while also appearing in a small role. The film began production in September 2022, wrapped up in December, and released in 2023, but turned out to be a complete failure.

Later in 2024, he next appears in cinema through a small cameo role in the film Abraham Ozler.

== Awards and honours ==
- 2008 Abu Dhabi Sakthi Award (Novel), Winner, Aadujeevitham
- 2009 Kerala Sahitya Akademi Award for Novel, Winner, Aadujeevitham
- 2012 Man Asian Literary Prize, Longlist, Goat Days
- 2013 DSC Prize for South Asian Literature, Shortlist, Goat Days
- 2014 Padmaprabha Literary Award
- 2018 JCB Prize for Literature, Winner, Jasmine Days
- 2018 Crossword Book Award for Indian language translation, Winner, Jasmine Days
- 2019 Muttathu Varkey Award
- 2021 Vayalar Award, Manthalirile 20 Communist Varshangal

== Bibliography ==
Year	Title	Title in English	Category	Publisher
2000	Euthanasia	Mercy Killing	Collection of stories	Calicut: Mulberry Publications
2000	Irunda Vanasthalikal	Dark Forest Places	Diary notes	Aluva: Pen Books
2006	Abeesagin	Abeesagin	Novel	Thrissur: Current Books
2006	Penmarattam	Ladies Sex	Collection of stories	Calicut: Haritham Books
2007	Pravachakanmarude Randam Pustakam	The Second Book of Prophets	Novel	Kottayam: DC Books
2008	Aadujeevitham	Goat Days	Novel	Thrissur: Green Books
2008	Akkapporinte Irupathu Nasrani Varshangal	Twenty Years of Christian Quarrels	Novel	Kottayam: DC Books
2010	E M Ssum Penkuttiyum	EMS and the Girl	Collection of stories	Kottayam: DC Books
2011	Manja Veyil Maranangal	Yellow Lights of Death	Novel	Kottayam: DC Books
2012	Anubhavam, Orma, Yathra	Experience, Memories & Travel	Memoirs	Calicut: Olive Publications
2013	Kathakal	Stories	Selected stories	Kottayam: DC Books
2013	Manushyan Enna Sahajeevi	Human, a fellow being	Collection of stories	Calicut: Mathrubhumi Books
2014	Al Arabian Novel Factory	Al Arabian Novel Factory	Novel	Kottayam: DC Books
2014	Mullappoo Niramulla Pakalukal	Jasmine Days	Novel	Kottayam: DC Books
2014	Ottamarathanal	Single tree shade	Memoirs	Thrissur: Green Books
2015	Irattamukhamulla Nagaram	A double faced city	Travelogue	Thrissur: Green Books
2015	Green Zoninu Veliyil Ninnu Ezhuthumbol	While writing outside from green zone	Collection of essays	Calicut: Mathrubhumi Books
2016	Kudiyettam: Pravasathinte Malayalivazhikal	Migration: The malayali ways of exile	Essays	Kottayam: DC Books
2017	Manthalirile 20 Communist Varshangal	20 Communist years of Manthalir	Novel	Kottayam: DC Books
2017	Ente Priyapetta Kathakal	My favourite stories	Selected stories	Kottayam: DC Books
2018	Shareera Shasthram	Physiology	Novel	Calicut: Mathrubhumi Books
2018	Postman	Postman	Collection of stories	Kottayam: DC Books
2020	Marquez Illatha Macondo	Macondo Without Marquez	Travelogue	Kottayam: DC Books
2020	Nishabda Sancharangal	The journey of silence	Novel	Kottayam: DC Books
2020	Akathe Christhu Purathe Christhu	Christ within and Christ without	Collection of speeches	Thrissur: Green Books
2020	Ennu Swantham (editor)	Your's Own	Letters	Kottayam: DC Books
2020	Puzhameenukale Kollunna Vidham (co-author)	How to kill river fishes?	Novel	Kottayam: DC Books
2021	Ennathullikalum Upputharikalum	Oil droplets and Salt flakes	Collection of essays	Calicut: Mathrubhumi Books
2022	Tharakans Grandhavari	Chronicles of Tharakan	Novel	Kottayam: DC Books
2023	Ethoru Manushyanteyum Jeevitham	Any human's life	Jottings	Calicut: Mathrubhumi Books
2023	Christy (co-authored with G. R. Indugopan)	Christy	Screenplay	Kottayam: Manorama Books
2024	Montricher Diary	Montricher Diary	Diary notes	Calicut: Mathrubhumi Books
2025	Aanoyude pirake, Gaamayude pirake	Behind Aano, behind Gaama	Travelogue	Calicut: Mathrubhumi Books
2025	Badal Vayanakal	Alternative Readings	Articles	Thrissur: Green Books
2025	Mulberry, Ennod Ninte Sorbayekkurich Parayu	Mulberry, Tell Me About Your Sorba	Novel	Kottayam: DC Books

=== Translations in English ===
- Benyamin (2012). Goat Days. Translated by Joseph Koyippally. New Delhi: Penguin Books. ISBN 978-0-143-41633-3.
- Benyamin (2015). Yellow Lights of Death. Translated by Sajeev Kumarapuram. New Delhi: Penguin Books. ISBN 978-0-143-42089-7.
- Benyamin (2018). Jasmine Days. Translated by Shahnaz Habib. New Delhi: Juggernaut Books. ISBN 978-9-386-22874-1.
- Benyamin (2019). Al Arabian Novel Factory. Translated by Shahnaz Habib. New Delhi: Juggernaut Books. ISBN 978-9-353-45066-3.
- Benyamin (2021). Addis Ababa. Translated by Veena Muthuraman. New Delhi: Juggernaut Books.
- Benyamin (2023). Marquez, EMS, Gulam and Others: Selected Short Stories. Translated by Swarup B. R. New Delhi: HarperCollins. ISBN 978-9-356-29567-4.

== Filmography ==
Year	Film	Director	Contribution	Notes
2023	Christy	Alvin Henry	Screenplay, Acting (played the role of Thomas)	Debut as a Scriptwriter
2023	Abraham Ozler	Midhun Manuel Thomas	Cameo appearance (played the role of Himself)	Cameo Appearance
2024	The Goat Life	Blessy	Story	Adaptation of novel Aadujeevitham
