= Janhavi Acharekar =

Indian writer

Janhavi Acharekar (born 1973) is an Indian writer of fiction and travel. She is the author of the novel Wanderers, All (2015), a collection of short stories Window Seat: Rush-hour stories from the city (2009), both published by HarperCollins and a travel guide Moon Mumbai and Goa (2009), by Moon Handbooks.

== Early life and education ==
Janhavi Acharekar grew up in the cities of Mumbai and Kolkata and obtained a degree in English from St Xavier's College, Mumbai, She has a master's degree in English from the University of Mumbai and a diploma in mass communication from the Xavier Institute of Communications. She began her writing career as a freelance journalist for The Independent while still a student at St. Xavier's and then went on to work as a copywriter in advertising.

== Career ==
Acharekar's novel Wanderers, All was published by HarperCollins India in 2015.

Her short stories appear in the collection Window Seat (HarperCollins India, 2009) (3) as well as in anthologies of short fiction such as the Indo-Australian Fear Factor: Terror Incognito and Only Connect: Short Fiction about Technology and Us from Australia and the Indian Subcontinent (5) (6) edited by Meenakshi Bharat and Sharon Rundle. Her story A Good Riot was shortlisted for The Little Magazine's new writing award in 2006

She is the author of Moon Mumbai & Goa (Avalon, 2009) (7), the first Indian destination travel guide to be published by the American travel book series Moon Handbooks

It was a finalist in the Travel Guide category at Foreword Magazine's Book Of The Year Awards (BOTYA, USA). A condensed version, Moon Spotlight Goa, was published in 2010. She was a special contributor to the travel guide Driving Holidays Across India by Outlook Traveller.

Acharekar is a freelance travel writer and arts journalist. She is a contributing editor at Conde Nast Traveller India (8) and writes book reviews and features for The Hindu. Her articles have appeared in The Statesman, The Times of India, Biblio, Vancouver Sun, and other publications. She has also curated several literary festivals in India and written two books for children (9).

Acharekar was awarded the Charles Wallace Visiting Writer's Fellowship at the University of Stirling in 2009. She was declared one of nine prominent Mumbai residents of the year by Asian Age (10) for her writing, in the same year. She has also been invited to writing residencies at Sangam House in Pondicherry, H.A.L.D. in Denmark, and to the International Writers' and Translators' House in Ventspils, Latvia. An occasional curator of literary festivals, she has curated/ co-curated the Kala Ghoda, Crossword and Celebrate Bandra litfests in Mumbai. She was the founder-curator of Lit.mus, a multi-disciplinary litfest in Bangalore.

In 2023, she was awarded a stipend-funded fellowship of three months in Germany at the renowned Foundation Künstlerdorf Schöppingen. The residency program that hosts international writers, visual artists, and composers was started in 1989 and is funded by the state of North Rhine-Westphalia and its Kunststiftung NRW. The foundation has more than a thousand applicants per year, the process is highly selective.

== Books ==
- Wanderers, All (HarperCollins, 2015). ISBN 9789351770152.
- Window Seat (HarperCollins, 2009). ISBN 978-81-7223-800-1.
- Moon Mumbai & Goa (Avalon, 2010). ISBN 9781598802412.
- Moon Spotlight Goa (Avalon, 2010). ISBN 1598803581.
- The Little Maharaja and Sher Khan (Crossover, 2010) ISBN 8190659707.
- The Maharaja's Last Prank (Crossover, 2010) ISBN 9788190659710.
