= Chuden Kabimo =

Indian Nepali-language writer

- छुदेन काविमो
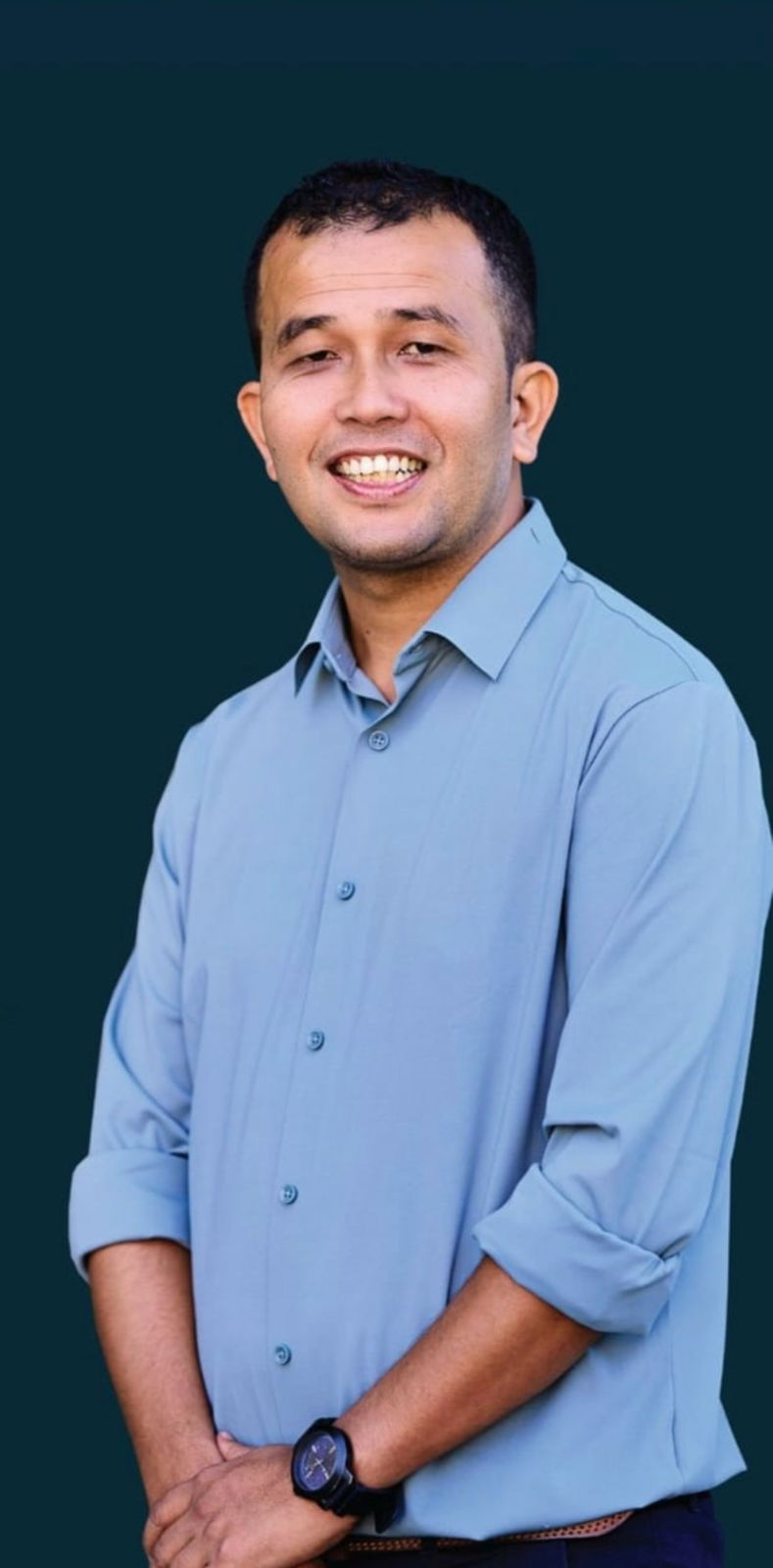
- Chuden Kabimo
- Born: Kalimpong District, India
- Occupation: Writer
- Notable work: 1986, Song of the Soil, Urmaal
- Awards: Madan Puraskar (2024), Sahitya Akademi Yuva Puraskar (2018)

Chuden Kabimo is an Indian Nepali language writer based in Kalimpong, India. Kabimo has authored three books. He is best known for his 2024 novel Urmaal and 2019 novel Faatsung, originally written in Nepali and translated into English as Song of the Soil in 2021.

He recently received the prestigious Madan Puraskar in 2024 for his novel Urmaal, which, like his first two books, revolves around the Gorkhaland movement.

He also won the prestigious Yuva Sahitya Akademy Puraskar in 2018 for his debut book, a collection of short stories titled 1986. His second book Faatsung was published in 2019 and was shortlisted for the Madan Puraskar for the same year. The English translation of the book Song of the Soil, translated by Ajit Baral was also shortlisted for the JCB Prize. Both of his first two works centered around the Gorkhaland movement in India.

In his speech on the award ceremony of Madan Puraskar, most prestigious literary award in Nepal, he said, "the job of literature is to preserve the human being within the human being itself".

== Notable works ==
- 1986, a short story collection
- Song of the Soil, novel, originally published in Nepali as Faatsung in 2019.
- Urmaal, novel, published in 2025

== Awards ==
- Winner – Sahitya Akademi Yuva Puraskar for Nepali (2018) for 1986.
- Nominated – Madan Puraskar (2018) for Faatsung.
- Nominated – JCB Prize (2022) for Song of the Soil.
- Winner – Madan Puraskar (2024) for Urmaal.
