= Delhi Gadhakal =

2011 novel by M. Mukundan

Delhi Gadhakal (Delhi: A Soliloquy)
- First edition
- Author: M. Mukundan
- Translator: Fathima E. V., Nandakumar K.
- Language: Malayalam
- Genre: Semi-autobiographical, fiction
- Publisher: DC Books
- Publication date: 1 November 2011
- Publication place: India
- English publication date: 2020
- Pages: 496
- ISBN: 978-81-264-3328-5

Delhi Gadhakal (Tales from Delhi) is a Malayalam language novel by M. Mukundan. It was first published as a book by D. C. Books in November 2011. The novel portrays the various events that greatly influenced the author's life during the 40 years spent in New Delhi, since 1962. The novel has as protagonist a leftist Kerala youth, named Sahadevan, who had the shock of his life when he landed in Delhi to hear the news of Chinese attack on India. It was translated from Malayalam by Fathima E. V. and Nandakumar K. under the title Delhi: A Soliloquy.

It took three years for Mukundan to finish the novel. It was released on 1 November 2011. The novel received much critical praise and soon went on to become one of the best-selling novels of the year. It also won several awards including the first Kamala Suraiyya Award.

== Background ==
Delhi Gadhakal has been penned in the backdrop of New Delhi, the city to which the author's name has been associated probably even more than his hometown, Mayyazhi (Mahe). The novel was inspired by various events that greatly influenced the author's life during the 40 years spent in New Delhi, since 1962.

== Characters ==
- Sahadevan - the protagonist.
- Sreedharanunni - A third-grade employee in the Parliament. It is Sreedharanunni who brings Sahadevan to Delhi.
- Devi - Sreedharanunni's wife.
- Sathyanathan - Sreedharanunni's son.
- Vidya - Sreedharanunni's daughter.
- Kunhikrishnan - A journalist working in Delhi.
- Lalita - Kunhikrishnan's wife.
- Vasavappanicker - An artist working in Delhi.
- Rosily - A Malayalee Christian woman who is forced to become a prostitute in Delhi.
- Kunhikkannan Master - A naxalist leader in Kerala.
- Janakikutty - Kunhikkannan Master's daughter.
- Uttam Singh - Sahadevan's house owner at Amrit Puri.
- Pinki - Singh's younger daughter.
- Jaswinder - Singh's elder daughter.
- Dasappan - A barber working in Delhi.
- Gulshan Wadhwa - Sahadevan's employer.
- Om Prakash Jain - Sahadevan's house owner at Jangpura.
- Ashok Chimber - Sahadevan's house owner at Malviya Nagar.
- Kuber Lal - Sahadevan's house owner at Mayur Vihar.
- Harilal Shukla - An art lover and Vasavappanicker's mentor.
- Vanaja - Sahadevan's sister.
- Shyamala - Sahadevan's sister.
- Abdul Abdunnissar - Vanaja's lover.
- Abdul Aleem - Sahadevan's employee.
- Divakaran Potti - Sahadevan's employee.
- Seetharam - the dhobi. He is a victim of forced-sterilisation during the Emergency.
- Jamaludheen - a Bangladeshi refugee.

== Release ==
The novel was released by former Kerala education minister M. A. Baby on 1 November 2011, at a cultural festival organised in connection with the 13th DC International Book Fair. In the event, Baby lauded the writer for his efforts to explore and recreate the mindset of the people during the Emergency and ‘their view of Indira Gandhi's misjudgement about people's power.'

== Awards ==
- 2012: Kamala Suraiyya Award
- 2012: VVK Award
- 2021: JCB Prize for Literature
