= Vinoy Thomas =

Indian writer

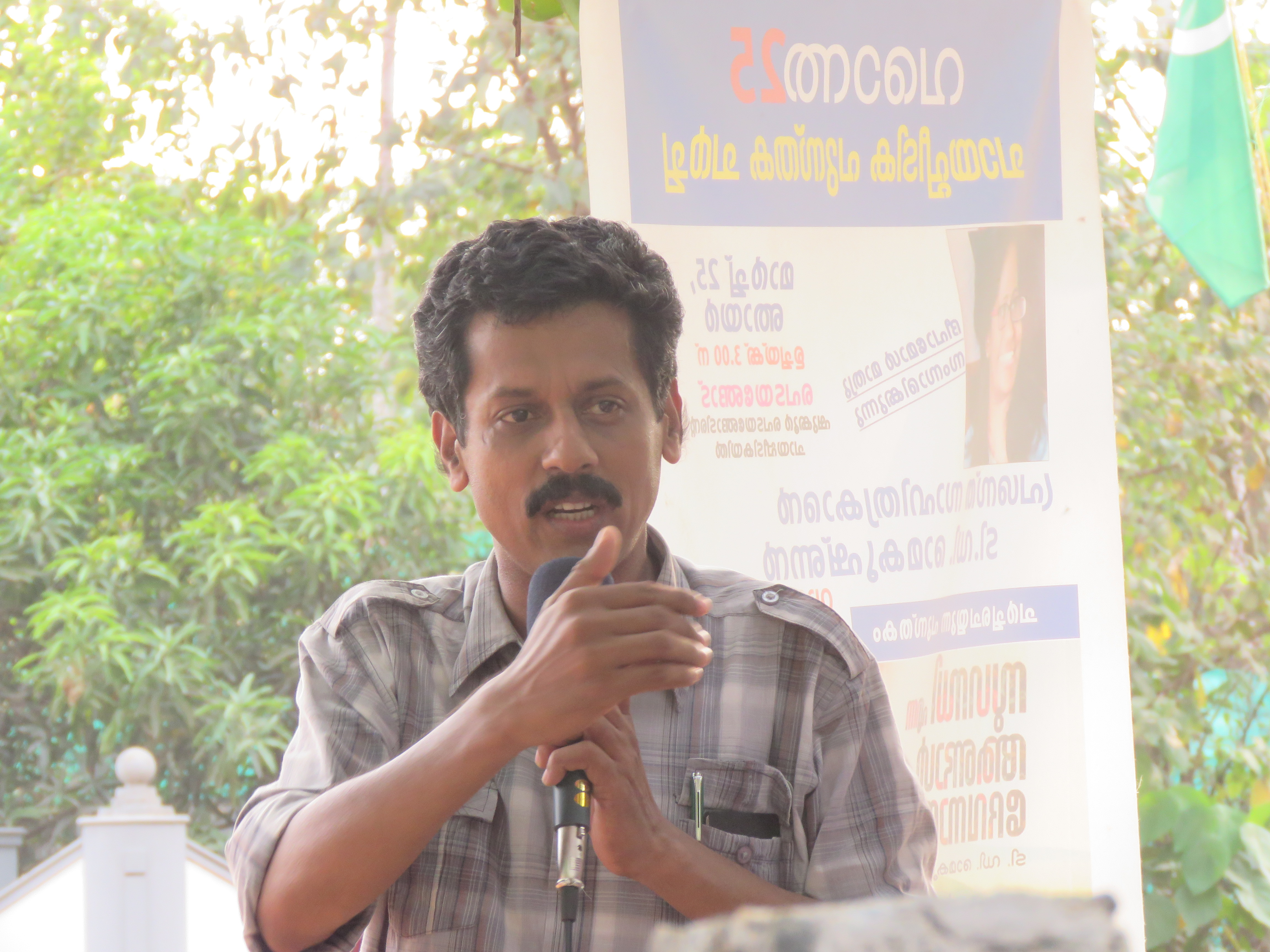
- Born: Nellikkampoyil, Iritty, Kannur, Kerala, India
- Education: St. Joseph's High School, Kunnoth; University of Calicut
- Occupation: Writer
- Notable work: Ramachi; Karikkottakkari; Puttu
- Awards: 2019 Kerala Sahitya Akademi Award for Story; Joseph Mundassery Award; V. P. Sivakumar Memorial Keli Award

Vinoy Thomas is an Indian writer who writes in Malayalam. He is known for his novels Karikkottakkari and Puttu as well as for his short stories such as Ramachi. Thomas is a recipient of the Kerala Sahitya Akademi Award for Story and Kerala Sahitya Akademi Award for Novel. Churuli, a Lijo Jose Pellissery movie, is based on one of his stories.

== Biography ==
Vinoy Thomas was born in Nellikkampoyil, near Iritty in Kannur district of the south Indian state of Kerala. After early education at St. Joseph's High School, Kunnoth, he completed his college education from the University of Calicut and joined the Government High School, Ulikkal where he serves as a teacher. He is married to Gigimol and the couple has a son, Adwait and a daughter, Akshari.

== Literary career ==
Ramachi, the first book published by Thomas, was a short story anthology and the book was released in 2014. Subsequently, he published his debut novel, Karikkottakkari, which narrated the lives of the migrants in a Kannur village of the same name. His next novel, Puttu (Molehill) was released in 2020 and it discussed incestual relationships in a high range village. He has also published another short story anthology, titled Mullaranjaanam (Waistband of Thorns). Churuli, a 2020 Malayalam film by Lijo Jose Pellissery is based on a short story by Vinoy Thomas.

== Filmography ==
Year	Title	Story	Screenplay	Notes
2021	Churuli	Yes	No	
2022	Palthu Janwar	Yes	Yes	
2022	Chathuram	Yes	Yes	

== Awards and honors ==
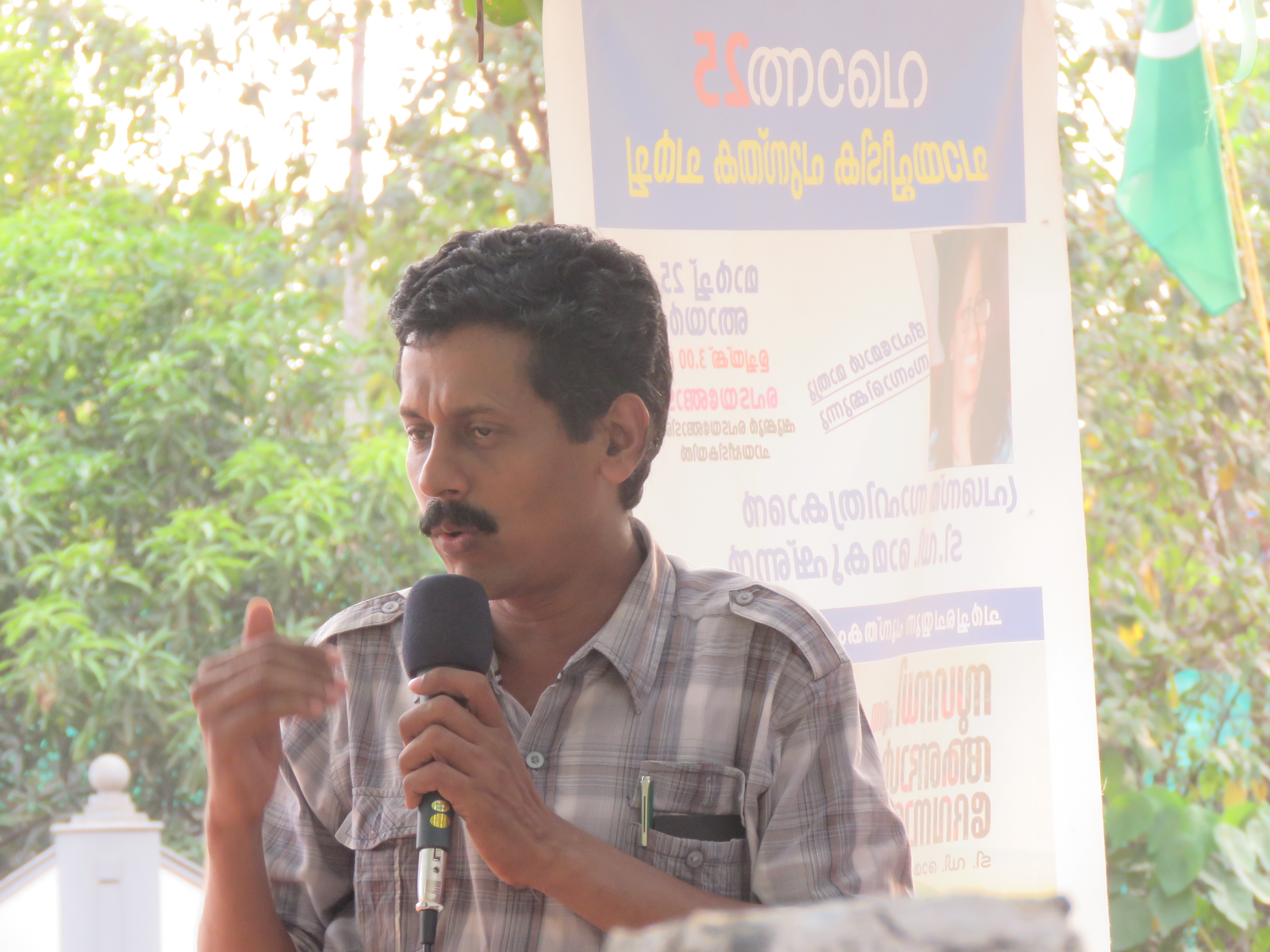

Vinoy Thomas received the 2019 Kerala Sahitya Akademi Award for Story for his anthology, Ramachi, the award announced in 2021. The anthology had earlier received the 'Edakkadu Sahithya Vedi Puraskaram'. He is also a recipient of 'Sakhav Verghese Memorial Award', 'Joseph Mundassery Award', 'V. P. Sivakumar Keli Award' and 'Kunjamu Purakkad Memorial Award'. He received the 2021 Kerala Sahitya Akademi Award for Novel for Puttu.

== Bibliography ==
No	Year	Title	Category	Publisher	ISBN	Awards
1	2014	Karikottakari (കരിക്കോട്ടക്കരി)	Novel	DC Books	978-81-264-5190-6	D.C. Kizhakemuri Birth Centenary 2014 Novel Competition Winner
2	2017	Ramachi (രാമച്ചി)	Short Stories	DC Books	9789386680778	Kerala Sahitya Akademi Award for Story
3	2019	Mullaranjanam (മുള്ളരഞ്ഞാണം)	Short Stories	DC Books	9789389445459	
4	2020	Puttu (പുറ്റ്)	Novel	DC Books	9789353904098	Kerala Sahitya Akademi Award for Novel
5	2022	Adiyor Mishiha Enna Novel (അടിയോർ മിശിഹ എന്ന നോവൽ)	Short Stories	DC Books	9789354821370	
6		Aanatham Piriyatham (ആനത്തം പിരിയത്തം)	Novel	DC Books	9789353905828	
7	2023	Muthal (മുതൽ)	Novel	DC Books	9789357323093	
8	2025	Aaksasavismayam ((ആകാശവിസ്മയം))	Novel	DC Books	9789370989061	BK Thiruvoth Memorial Award
9	2026	Prothaseesinte Ithihasam (പ്രോത്താസീസിന്റെ ഇതിഹാസം)	Novella	DC Books	9789364875714	
10	2026	Kallakkadathukaalam (കള്ളക്കടത്തുകാലം)	Memoirs,	DC Books	9789370984875	

== See also ==
- S. Hareesh
- N. Prabhakaran
