= Maria, Just Maria =

2018 novel by Sandhya Mary

- Author: Sandhya Mary
- Translator: Jayasree Kalathil
- Language: Malayalam
- Genre: Novel
- Publisher: HarperCollins India (English translation)
- Publication date: 2018
- Publication place: India
- English publication date: 2024
- Media type: Print

Maria, Just Maria is a novel by the Indian writer Sandhya Mary, written in Malayalam and translated into English by Jayasree Kalathil. Mary's debut novel, it follows Maria, a woman in a Syrian Christian family in Kerala who stops speaking after her grandfather's death and recalls her unconventional childhood from a psychiatric hospital. The novel was shortlisted for the 2024 JCB Prize, and Kalathil's translation won the Crossword Book Award for translation in 2024.

== Background and publication ==
Maria, Just Maria was first published in Malayalam as Maria Verum Maria in 2018 and was Sandhya Mary's first novel. Jayasree Kalathil's English translation was published by HarperCollins India in 2024. Kalathil had earlier won the 2020 JCB Prize for her translation of S. Hareesh's Moustache.

== Plot ==
After the death of her grandfather, Maria stops speaking, by choice rather than inability, and is admitted to a psychiatric hospital. The narrative moves between her time in the hospital and her childhood at the ancestral home of Kottarathil Veedu, where she grew up among her grandfather Geevarghese, a great-aunt with dementia, long-dead relatives, a dog given to philosophical conversation, and a figure of Jesus with whom she talks. Told in a non-linear, fragmented form, the book traces several generations of the family while questioning the boundary between sanity and madness.

== Themes ==
Reviewers read the novel as a study of how society labels as mad those who do not conform, with Maria's silence and detachment presented as her authentic self rather than illness. Writing for The Polis Project, the reviewer argued that the book's disordered narrative and its centring of a woman deemed mad work together as a critique of the normal-and-abnormal binary. Critics also discussed its treatment of memory, noting that Maria recalls events her own relatives cannot confirm, which the Asian Review of Books linked to the way personal identity is built on uncertain recollection.

== Reception ==
Reviewing the translation for the Asian Review of Books, the critic described it as a story of lost childhood and a study of how the stories people tell themselves shape who they become. Writing for Asymptote, Diya Isha focused on Kalathil's translation, noting that it keeps the novel's wordplay and humour visible rather than smoothing them away, and does not hide that the book is a translation. The novel was shortlisted for the 2024 JCB Prize, and Kalathil received the Crossword Book Award for translation for the second time.
