= Churuli =

2021 film by Lijo Jose Pellisery

- Official release poster
- Directed by: Lijo Jose Pellissery
- Screenplay by: S. Hareesh
- Story by: Vinoy Thomas
- Based on: "Kaligeminarile Kuttavalikal" from the book Mullaranjanam by Vinoy Thomas
- Produced by: Lijo Jose Pellissery; Chemban Vinod Jose
- Starring: Vinay Forrt; Chemban Vinod Jose; Joju George; Soubin Shahir; Jaffar Idukki
- Cinematography: Madhu Neelakandan
- Edited by: Deepu S. Joseph
- Music by: Sreerag Saji
- Production companies: Movie Monastery; Chembosky Motion Pictures
- Distributed by: SonyLIV
- Release dates: 11 February 2021 (IFFK); 19 November 2021
- Running time: 120 minutes (IFFK); 114 minutes (SonyLIV)
- Country: India
- Language: Malayalam

Churuli (transl. Spiral) is a 2021 Indian Malayalam-language science fiction horror film directed by Lijo Jose Pellissery and written by S. Hareesh. It stars Vinay Forrt, Chemban Vinod Jose, Joju George, Soubin Shahir and Jaffar Idukki. The film was produced by Lijo Jose Pellissery and Chemban Vinod Jose under the banner of Movie Monastery and Chembosky Motion Pictures, with Jesto Varghese, O Thomas Panicker and Naushad Salahudin as co-producers. The screenplay were based on a short story, Kaligeminarile Kuttavalikal, from Vinoy Thomas' book Mullaranjanam.

In the film, two undercover police officers, pursuing a wanted criminal find themselves stuck in the village of Churuli as eerie mysteries unfolds.

Churuli premiered at IFFK on 11 February 2021. It was later released via SonyLIV on 19 November 2021.

== Plot ==
A monk travels through a forest to capture Perumadan, an evil spirit, which misleads travelers in the forest. All the creatures in the forest wink at the monk as if he is familiar to them. On his way, the monk comes across a rolled up pangolin. Assuming that it is a ball, he takes it with him to gift it to his children. After a while, the pangolin starts speaking and advises the monk to take another path. He listens to the pangolin and gets lost in the woods. It is revealed that the monk is still wandering in the forest because he failed to realize that the pangolin was actually Perumadan in disguise.

In the present day, two police officers go on a covert mission to capture a criminal named Myladumparambil Joy hiding in a village named Churuli. The duo assume false names as Anthony and Shajivan. Anthony is an experienced policeman, while Shajivan is a rookie. The duo boards a jeep heading to Churuli under the pretext of working for a man named Thankan. The jeep driver tells them that Thankan is currently not in Churuli, but to stay in the village until he returns. Anthony attempts to befriend fellow passengers who seem friendly. On their way, they cross a wooden bridge. After this, the passengers and the driver abruptly change their pleasant demeanor and start being crass towards the duo, which shocks them.

In Churuli, the duo stay and work in a tavern owned by a man named Philip and wait for Thankan's return. Anthony quickly adapts to Churuli's unusual environment and people, spending most of the day drinking alcohol and eating game meat. Shajivan struggles to adjust and starts dreaming of strange lights and two mysterious alien-like figures. After spending many days in tavern waiting for Thankan and searching for clues about Joy, Shajivan goes looking for Thankan's house. On the way, Shajivan inquires about Joy to an old lady who remarks that he looks familiar and starts chasing after him with an axe. Shajivan escapes and returns to the tavern.

At night, the duo discuss the current situation and comes to the conclusion that most of the inhabitants of the village are criminals with multiple aliases. Shajivan suggests informing the police department so that they can arrive and apprehend the villagers, but Anthony advises him that they should ignore the people of the village and focus on their mission. The next day, the tavern keeper instructs them to clean up the tavern so that it can be turned into a makeshift church for his daughters' first communion ceremony. During the event Shajivan meets the old lady again, who closes her eyes in a strange manner after seeing him. Since Thankan was not at the ceremony, the duo assumes that Thankan is Joy's alias.

Anthony accompanies a local hunter for a hunt and doesn't return, even after three days has passed. Looking for answers, Shajivan goes for a trek and comes across the house of the person who supplies cassava to the tavern. While staring into a window of the house, he is startled by strange cogs and gears accompanied by lights. Anthony and the local hunter return empty-handed, for which the man blames and berates Anthony, but Shajivan, who is now surprisingly confident, defends Anthony. After an unspecified amount of time, a Kodagu man in the village begins to find the duo suspicious. The two policemen, locals and the Kodagu man visit a local mela, where he and Shajivan play slap boxing.

During the game, Shajivan is trashed and humiliated by the Kodagu man, whose every slap causes him to experience strange visions. That night, Anthony is woken up by thunder and finds Shajivan missing from bed. The next day, Anthony asks him about the previous night, but Shajivan brushes it off, telling that it might have been a dream. The Kodagu man goes missing and his corpse is shown to be laying on a riverbank. One night, the hunter and the duo head out for another hunt. Shajivan confidently takes lead of the hunt and tries to track down a bison. He spots two creatures similar to what he saw in his dreams where the bison is supposed to be. The creatures surprise him with a sound, causing him to shoot in their direction. The bullet hits the bison and Anthony tries to chase it, but he falls and sprains his ankle.

The hunter butchers the animal and abandons the policemen, taking all the meat with him. Shajivan carries Anthony on his back, but loses his way in the forest. After much effort they return to the village and take Anthony to a local healer woman, who lives with a boy. The woman's hut is shown to be similar to the visions Shajivan saw during the slap boxing. The woman performs a healing ritual and Anthony begins to have hallucinations of spirals and the people of Churuli. The following morning, Anthony is completely cured, where he flirts with the woman and leaves. As they leave, the woman accuses Shajivan of abusing the boy. Anthony settles the issue by giving her money, fearing legal repercussions, while Shajivan denies the whole affair.

Meanwhile, Thankan returns from town and is informed about the duo, where he becomes furious as he has not asked anyone to work for him. Thankan and rest of the villagers question the duo and decide to kill them both. Since their cover is blown, Shajivan fires a warning shot and apprehends Thankan. Upon questioning, Thankan reveals that he is not Joy, but the real Joy resides in his home. Thankan leads the two policemen to his house while the locals follow behind. Upon arriving at the house, they find a paralyzed Joy for whom Thankan and his wife plead for mercy. Shajivan declines their request for mercy, but the tone quickly shifts where Thankan and the villagers start taunting the policemen.

The villagers try to overpower them, causing Shajivan to fire at the crowd. The shot wounds two villagers, including Philip, who remain unfazed and laugh it off. Joy calls Philip nearby and tells him that he wishes to surrender and leave the village. The police duo ties up Joy and takes him away in the Jeep. On the way, Joy starts narrating a reimagined version of the monk's story, now with two policemen instead of the monk and Joy instead of Perumadan. The policemen notice that the wooden bridge they crossed to arrive at Churuli is now nowhere to be seen and speculate that they have lost the way. Joy guides them to another road and continues his story.

This road is revealed to be a spiral path deep in the forest which leads to nowhere. Joy explains everything that has happened to the duo since they arrived in Churuli through the story and reveals that this process is cyclical. After the story ends, Joy miraculously cures himself of his paralysis and frees himself from his restrains. Anthony stops the Jeep and becomes distracted by mysterious orbs of light which float past them. The orbs combine to form a moon, which starts floating above the woods. Anthony looks towards Shajivan, who seems strangely calm. Shajivan closes his eyes and inexplicably switches place with Joy. Now completely under a strange influence, the trio are overjoyed as the moon grows larger and pulsating. The jeep starts floating towards the moon with the trio gleefully clinging onto it, until they merge with the moon.

== Cast ==
- Vinay Forrt as Shajeevan, Civil Police Officer
- Chemban Vinod Jose as Antony, Assistant Sub Inspector
- Jaffar Idukki as Philip, Toddy Shop Manager
- Joju George as Thankan
- Soubin Shahir as Mayiladumparambil Joy
- Sajin Gopu as Jeep Driver
- Lukman Avaran as Moonji Biju
- Surjith Gopinath as Hunter
- Geethi Sangeetha as Pengal Thanka
- Hariprashanth M G as the man from Kodagu
- Biju as Kudakan's Helper
- Anilamma P. P. as Old Woman
- Rajappan as Mooppan
- Akash as Boy at Thankan's House
- Bhadra Venkideswaran as Thankan's wife
- Manoj Chamravattom as Church Priest
- Vinoy Thomas as Jeep passenger
- Sudheesh Vannapuram as Jeep passenger
- Kirannath Kailas as Jeep passenger
- Ramakrishnan as Jeep passenger
- Parameshwan as Jeep passenger

== Production ==
The film was shot in Kulamavu, Idukki under great secrecy. Vinay Forrt revealed that the filming was completed in just 19 days months before the COVID-19 pandemic. The voiceover for the trailer was given by actress Geethi Sangeetha, who also played an important role in the film.

== Accolades ==
List of awards and nominations for Churuli
Year	Award	Category	Recipient(s)	Result	Ref.
2021	15th Asian Film Awards	Best Art Director	Gokuldas	Nominated	
2021	15th Asian Film Awards	Best Sound	Renganaath Ravee	Nominated	
2020	25th International Film Festival of Kerala	Audience Poll Award (Silver Peacock)	Lijo Jose Pellissery	Won	
2020	25th International Film Festival of Kerala	Special Mention for Best Direction	Lijo Jose Pellissery	Won	
2021	Kerala State Film Awards	Best Cinematographer	Madhu Neelakandan	Won	
2021	Kerala State Film Awards	Best Sound Design	Renganaath Ravee	Won	
2021	Kerala State Film Awards	Best Colourist	Liju Prabhakar	Won	

Churuli was also screened at Gala Section in 34th Tokyo International Film Festival.

== Reception ==
Churuli received mixed to positive reviews from critics who praised its visuals, cast performances and complex storyline, while the extreme profanity used in the film became highly controversial.

On the review aggregator website Rotten Tomatoes, 67% of 9 critics' reviews are positive, with an average rating of 6/10.

Anna Mathews of The Times of India gave 3 out of 5 stars and wrote "Churuli is so bound by this idiosyncrasy of the filmmaker, that the story – slight as it is – seems to have been sacrificed for the sake of creating an ambiance." Cris of The News Minute gave 3 out of 5 stars and wrote "This Lijo Jose movie is mysterious, funny but loses focus at times. Beautiful performances by Chemban Vinod and Vinay Forrt, humour, fantasy, and mystery make ‘Churuli’ a charming film and it is a worth to watch movie." Baradwaj Rangan of Film Companion wrote "Usually films come full-circle. But here it's like a hypnotist's wheel. From the center point of the inciting incident, the narrative spins further and further away into an unending whirlpool." Malayala Manorama wrote "Churuli will throw your world into a perpetual spiral. Walk into Lijo's Churuli baring your values, and if that's a problem, then at least be ready to embrace the darkness that resides in the centre of your light for two hours".

On 24 November 2021, the CBFC confirmed that SonyLIV's streaming version of the film was not certified.

== See also ==
- List of films featuring time loops
