= Neendoor Subrahmanya Swami Temple =

Hindu temple in Kerala, India

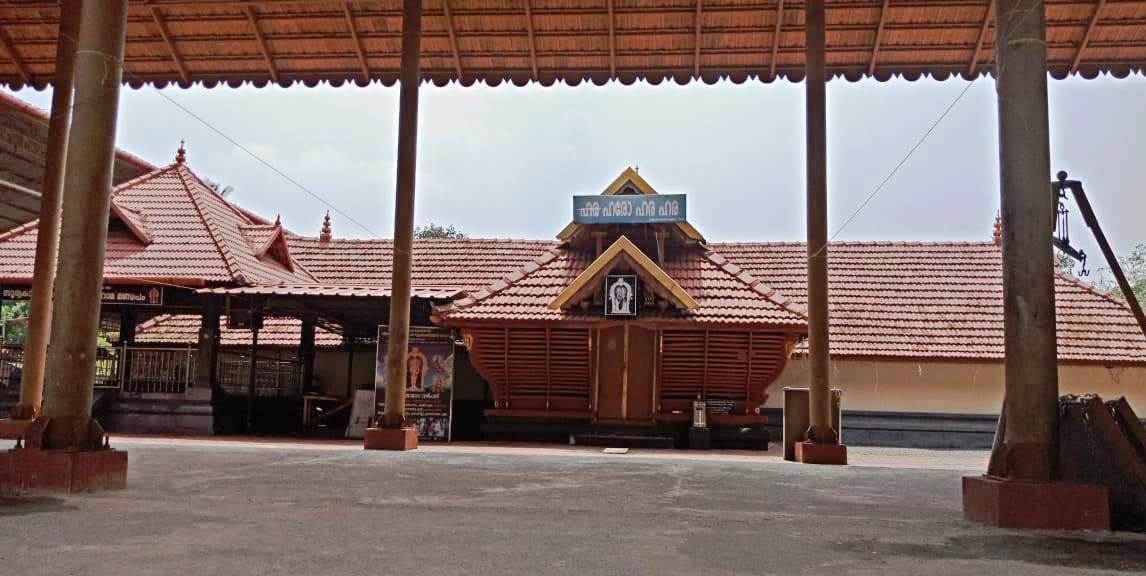

- Subrahmanya Swamy Temple, Neendoor, Kottayam, Kerala

Religion
- Affiliation: Hinduism
- District: Kottayam
- Deity: Subrahmanyan as Neendoorappan
- Festivals: Thiru ulsavam in Medam, Thaipooyam
- Governing body: Kerala Ksehthra Samrakshana Samithi

Location
- Location: Neendoor
- State: Kerala
- Country: India
- Interactive map of Neendoor Subrahmanya Swami Temple
- Coordinates: 9°40′40.6″N 76°30′24.1″E

Architecture
- Type: Traditional Kerala style

Specifications
- Temple: One
- Elevation: 39.04 m (128 ft)

Neendoor Subrahmanya Swami Temple is an ancient lord Murugan temple located in the Neendoor, Kottayam district (Kerala, India). The Neendoor Subrahanya Swami Temple is a historic site which has brought glory and fame to the local area. Myths say that the Pandavas and the sage Vyasa worshipped at this temple. The deity of the temple is Lord Muruga. Neendoor Subrahmanya Swami Temple hosts the arattu festival, which is celebrated on a grand scale on the Medashasti day in April–May every year. The Ottanarangamala Samarppanam is one of the important rituals of this temple.

== Deity ==
In the temple, the furious form of Murugan is worshipped. The Vel is pointed downwards. Murugan is worshipped here in the form of Devasenapathi, the supreme general of the holy forces. The deity is said to be in an angry and furious mood as he had fought with Tharakasuran in a confrontation known as the "Tharakasura Nigraha Bhavam". He faces east as seen in most of the temples. Mahaganapathi, Dhakshinamoorthi (Lord Shiva), Thooninmel Bhagavathi (Bhadrakali), Shathavu, Durga, Nagaraja, and Bhahmarakshs are also worshipped at the temple as subordinate deities. Tuesday is the important day for the temple in regards to the worship of Murugan.

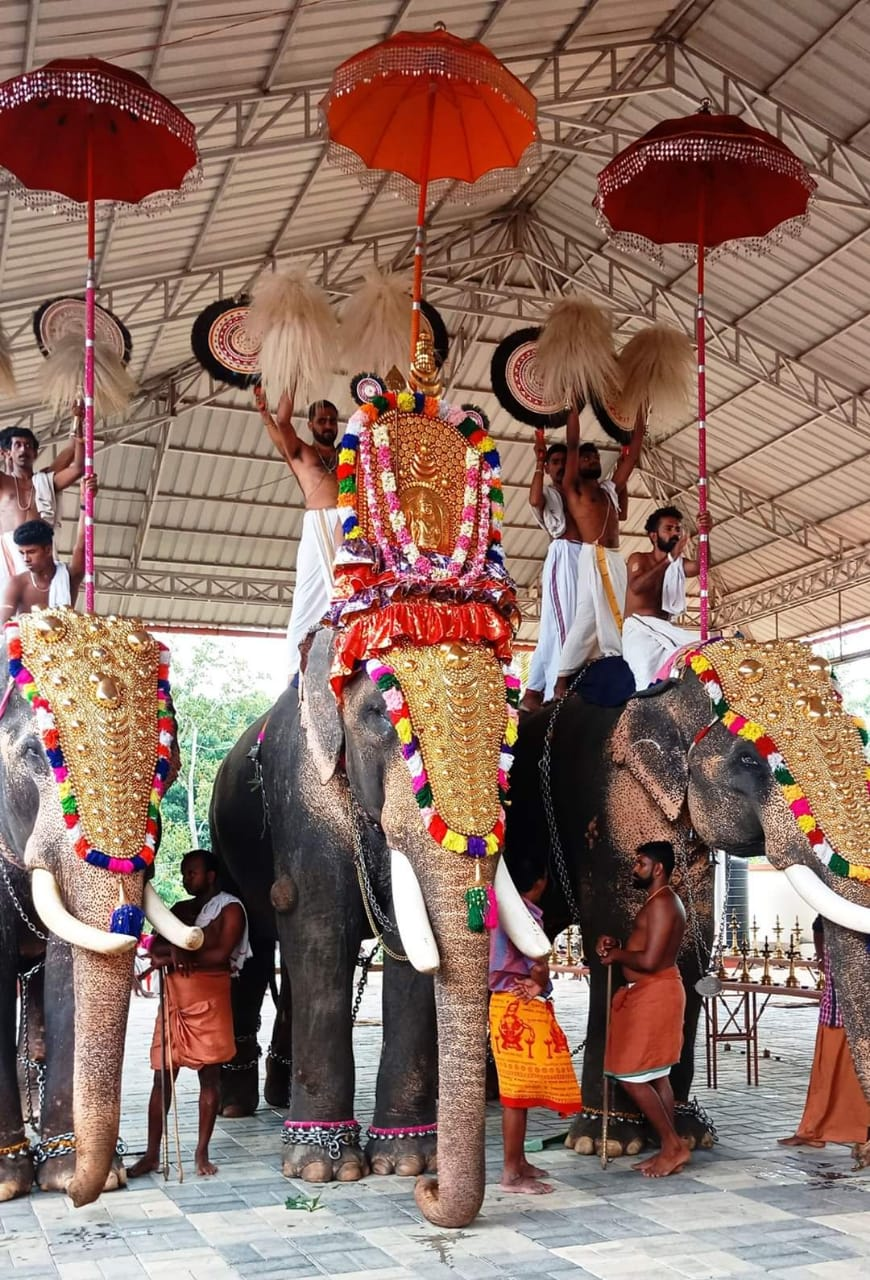
Neendoor Subrahmanya Swami Temple-Festival

== Neendoor Inscriptions ==
Neendoor is a holy place with many temples. A lot of people come here and pray to Lord Muruga. The pooja is performed by Brahmin priests within the temple. The temple's main festival takes place during the month of April or May, lasting for 6 days. Neendoor Subrahmanya Swami Temple hosts the arattu festival celebrated on a grand scale on the Medashasti day. Thaipooyam is another important festival hosted at the temple.

== Religious Significance ==
Subrahmanya is also known as Karthikeya in other regions apart from the Dravidian regions. In Kerala, he is known as the Subrahmanya Swamy. His other names are Mayil Vahanan, Murugan, Senthil, Velan, Kandan, Kadamban, Arumugam, Devasenapathi and Shanmugam. He is worshipped as God's army and a symbol of victory. His bird is the peacock and his weapon is called a Vel.

Many devotees come to the temple to offer prayers and perform rituals to Lord Subrahmanya, asking that their new ventures be successful. This temple conducts a very old special ritual named Ottanarangamala Samarppanam. This is the only temple of Lord Subrahmanya Swamy where this type of ritual is performed.

Here, Lord Subrahmanya Swamy is depicted as the Lord when he just defeated the demon named Tharakasuran. All the temple's rituals are done according to strict rules and regulations.

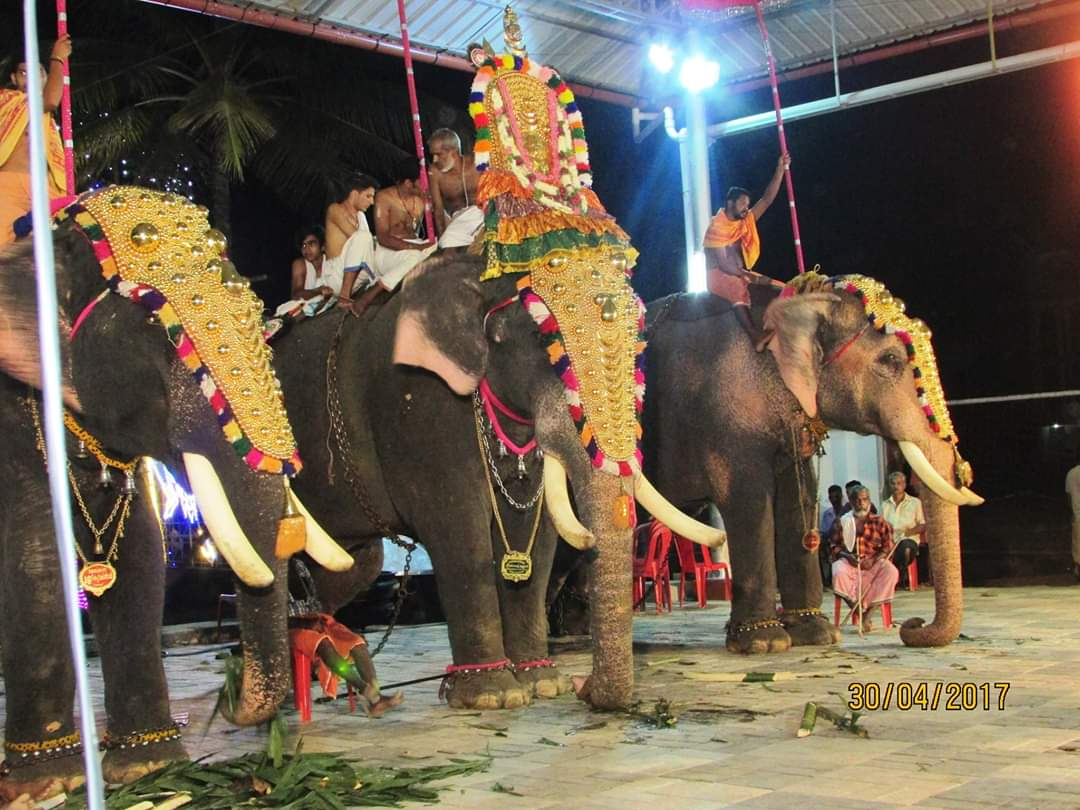
Neendoor Subrahmanya Swami Temple - Festival (Kazhchasreebali Ezhunnallathu)

== Architecture ==
Neendoor Subrahmanya Swamy Temple is a typical Kerala temple. It is built out of Laterite stone, terracotta tiles and teak wood, all of which are abundant in the surrounding region. The vast temple is rectangular with a porch entrance, looking altogether like a traditional royal house as seen in Kerala State. The main deity is Lord Subrahmanya Swamy, and he stands in the sanctum sanctorum with his weapon called Vel. The background is filled with ornate gold. In front of this temple stands a monolith carved Deepa Sthamba or the light lamp made of stone. This temple has wooden carvings running throughout its structure.

== See also ==
- Temples of Kerala
