= V. P. Sivakumar =

Indian writer and translator (1947–1993)

- Born: 15 May 1947; Mavelikkara, Alappuzha district, Kerala, India
- Died: 27 July 1993 (aged 46); Thiruvananthapuram, Kerala
- Occupations: Short story writer, essayist, translator
- Spouse: Geetha
- Parents: Padmanabhan Nair (father); Janaky Amma (mother)

Vazhappilliyil Padmanabhan Nair Sivakumar (1947–1993), commonly identified as V. P. Sivakumar, was an Indian writer and translator, known for bringing in a new sensibility in Malayalam literature through his short stories. Besides four short story anthologies, he published a compilation of satirical articles and translated several works of Jorge Luis Borges and Eugène Ionesco into Malayalam.

== Biography ==
V. P. Sivakumar was born on 15 May 1947 at Mavelikkara, in Alappuzha district of the south Indian state of Kerala to Pozharamath Padmanabhan Nair and Thekke Vazhappilliyil Janaki Amma. After completing his schooling in Pandalam and Mavelikkara, he joined St. Berchmans College to earn a graduate degree from the University of Kerala. Subsequently, he started his career in 1966 by joining the telephones department but his stay there was short as he was terminated from service for participating in a workers' strike. He utilised this opportunity to study further and after securing a master's degree in Malayalam with first rank, he worked as a lecturer in various government colleges in Kerala.

Sivakumar was married to Geetha and the couple had two sons. He died on 27 July 1993, at the age of 46, succumbing to cancer.

== Legacy and honours ==
Sivakumar's body of work comprises four short story anthologies, starting with the 1979 publication, Thiruvithamkoor Kathakal, followed by Karayogam Otta and V. P. Sivakumarinte Kathakal. He also published Thalasthanathe Hanuman, a compilation of some of his satirical articles. Borges Kathakal is an anthology of short stories of Jorge Luis Borges, translated into Malayalam by Sivakumar. Three plays of Eugene Ionesco were also translated by him. His writings have been subjected to study by several critics and V. P. Sivakumar, written by D. Pradeep Kumar, is one among them. Smarana (Remembrances), is a festschrift published on him in 2003. A literary award, V. P. Sivakumar Memorial Keli Award, has been instituted in his honour and the recipients of the award include K. R. Meera, Subhash Chandran, S. Hareesh and Ambikasuthan Mangad.

== Bibliography ==
=== Short story anthologies ===
- V. P. Sivakumar (1979). Thiruvithamkoor Kathakal. Kottayam: Sahitya Pravarthaka Co-operative Society.
- Sivakumar V. P. (1983). Karayogam. Kottayam: Sahitya Pravarthaka Sahakarana Sangam.
- Sivakumar V. P. (1987). Otta. Kottayam: DCB.
- V. P. Sivakumar (1995). V. P. Sivakumarinte Kathakal. DC Books. ISBN 978-8171305599.

=== Translations ===
- V. P. Sivakumar (1983). Borges Kathakal. Paridhi Publications.

=== Articles ===
- V. P. Sivakumar (1995). Thalasthanathe Hanuman. Kozhikode: Mulberry Publications.

=== Books on V. P. Sivakumar ===
- D. Pradeep Kumar (2016). V. P. Sivakumar. Kerala Bhasha Institute. ISBN 9788120038547.
- Smarana -V. P. Sivakumar. DC Books. 2003. ASIN B007E4WTHC.

== See also ==
- List of Malayalam-language authors by category
- List of Malayalam-language authors
