= N. Prabhakaran =

Indian writer

N Prabhakaran
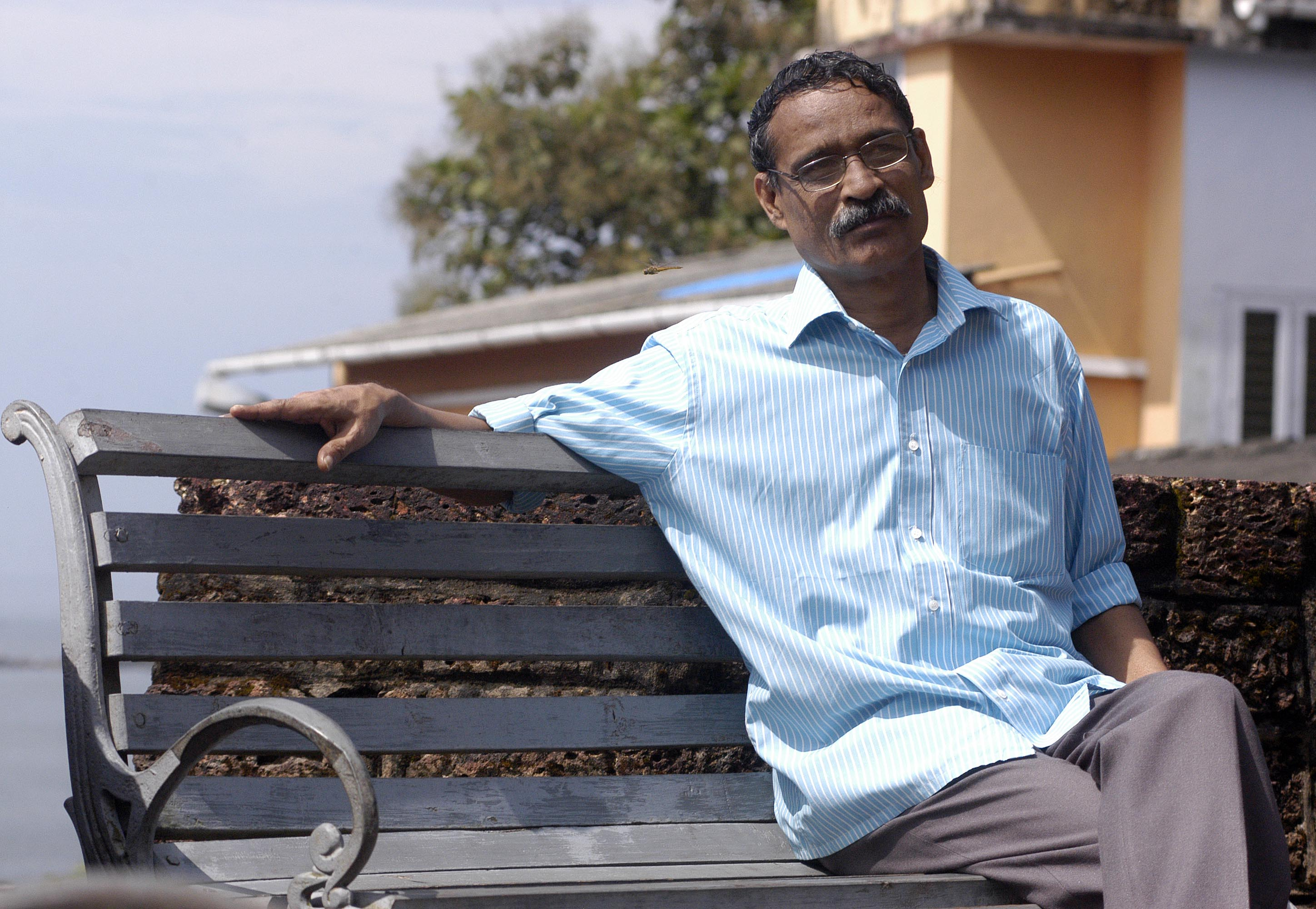
- Born: 30 December 1952 (age 73); Parassinikadavu, India
- Occupations: Writer, Professor
- Spouse: K P Reena
- Writing career
- Language: Malayalam
- Period: 1966–present
- Genres: Short story, novel, novella, play, travelogue, screen play, literary criticism
- Notable works: Thiyur Rekhakal, Pulijanmam

N. Prabhakaran is a noted short story writer, novelist, poet, playwright, essayist, educationist, editor and columnist in Malayalam. He won the 2022 Kerala Sahitya Akademi Fellowship.

== Early life ==
The eldest of the five children born to N Kunhambu and A Kalliani, Prabhakaran was born at Parassinikkadavu in Kannur district of Kerala on 30 December 1952. He spent his childhood days at Madayi. Prabhakaran studied at Madayi L P School, Govt. High School, Madayi, Payyannur College and Government Brennen College, Thalassery. He served as a lecturer at the Dept. of Malayalam of Lekshmipuram college of Arts and Science, Neyyoor, Kanyakumari District, Tamil Nadu, University College, Thiruvananthapuram, CKG Memorial Govt College, Perambra, and Govt Brennen College, Thalassery, and retired while serving as the Head of the Malayalam Department of Brennen College. The writer also served as a visiting professor of Malayalam at the University of Calicut. Prabhakaran resides at Dharmadam in Thalassery.

== Literary career ==
Though N Prabhakaran began writing in 1966, he established himself as a writer with the short story "Ottayante Pappan", published in 1971. The story won the first prize in the short story competition for college students conducted by Mathrubhumi Azhchappathippu, the Malayalam general interest weekly, in connection with its Vishu special.

Now N Prabhakaran has 55 books, spanning a number of genres, to his credit.

N. Prabhakaran has also received the 2022 Kerala Sahitya Akademi Fellowship.

== List of works ==
Short story collections

- Prabhakaran, N. (1986). Ottayante pappan / Mahout of the Lone Tusker (in Malayalam).
- Marupiravi
- Prabhakaran, N. (1994). Rathrimozhi (in Malayalam).
- Parakkum Paravathani (1996)
- Katha
- Mayamayan
- Prabhakaran, N. (2007). Thiranjetutha Kathakal. Kottayam: DC Books. ISBN 978-81-264-1550-2. OCLC 182621975.
- Bhoomiyude Attathu (2011)
- Ittarciyile Sooryan (2008)
- Prabhakaran, N. (2013). Wagonyathra. Kottayam: DC Books.
- Rameswaram (2015)
- Prabhakaran, N. (2016). Manassu pokunna vazhiye. Kottayam: DC Books.
- Marupiraviyum Mattu Kathakalum (Marupiravi and Other Stories) (2016)
- Prabhakaran, N. (2018). Oru thoniyude athma kathayil ninnu (in Malayalam). Kozhikode: Mathrubhumi Books.
- Rameswaravum Mattu Kathakalum (Rameswarm and Other Stories) (2019)
- Sooryan Valare Aduthayirunnu (Sun was so Close) (2020)

Novellas

- Prabhakaran, N. (1986). Ezhinum Meethe (in Malayalam). DC Books. p. 50. ISBN 9788126409471.
- Janthujanam (1987)
- Bhoothabhoomi (1995)
- Adrusyavanangal (1998)
- Prabhakaran, N. (2008). N Prabhakarante Novellakal. Kottayam: DC Books. p. 193. ISBN 978-81-264-3168-7. OCLC 762380268.
- Prabhakaran, N. (2013). Oru Malayali branthante dairy. Kozhikode: Mathrubhumi Books.
- Prabhakaran, N. (2014). Kshouram. DC Books. p. 72. ISBN 978-8126452088.
- Prabhakaran, N. (2011). N.Prabhakarante novellakal. Kottayam: DC Books.

Novels

- Prabhakaran, N. (1999). Thiyoor Rekhakal. DC Books. p. 211. ISBN 978-8126407309.
- Prabhakaran, N. (1997). Bahuvachanam. Kottayam: National Book Stall.
- Prabhakaran, N. (2005). Jeevande Thelivukal (in Malayalam). DC Books. p. 300. ISBN 9788126409907.
- Prabhakaran, N. (2008). Janakadha. Kottayam: D.C.Books.
- Prabhakaran, N. (May 2019). Mayamanushyar. Mathrubhumi Books. ISBN 9788182678682.
- Prabhakaran, N. (2025). Mahanatanam. Mathrubhumi Books. p. 158. ISBN 9789359628783.

Anthology of poems

- Kalnada (2004)
- Prabhakaran, N. (2009). Njan Theruvilekku Nokki (in Malayalam). DC Books. p. 31. ISBN 978-81-264-2432-0.
- Kakka (2012)

Play

- Pulijanmam (1987)
- Maranakkinar (1990)

Travelogue

- Prabhakaran, N. (2008). Kudaku Kurippukal (in Malayalam). Kairali Books. p. 107. ISBN 9789381649626.

Screenplays

- Prabhakaran, N. (2009). Pulijanmam. DC Books. ISBN 978-8126426959.
- Pigman

Collections of essays

- Prabhakaran, N. (1991). Katha Thedunna Katha (in Malayalam).
- Prabhakaran, N. (2001). Kathatmakam (in Malayalam). Thrissur: Current Books.
- Maunathinte Muzhakkangal (2005)
- Nanmayute Mamaram (2007)
- Azhathil Vecha Kallukal (2012)
- Prabhakaran, N. (2015). Athmavinte Swntham Nattil Ninnu. Kottayam: DC Books. p. 112. ISBN 978-81-264-6461-6. OCLC 948805441.
- Kavithayude Kathal (2017)
- Ezhuthinte Swadesam (2018)

Collections of speeches

- Pathu Prabhashanangal (2016)

Memoirs

- Ittittipullu (2018)

Autobiography

- Njan Mathramallatha Njan is being serialised from November 2020 in Truecopy Web Magazine.

Children's literature

- Manas Enna Sanchari (A Traveller Called Manas) 2021.

Literary Study

- Sathyathil Ninnum Soundharyathilekkulla Dhooram Ethrayanu? (How Far is Beauty from Truth?) (2021)

Miscellaneous

- Atmavinte Annam (The Food of the Soul) (2021)

Cultural Studies

- Prabhakaran, N. (2024). Vadakkan Manass (The Soul of North Malabar). Kozhikode: Mathrubhumi Books. p. 150. ISBN 9789359624235.

=== Edited works ===
- Editorial Core Committee Convener of Nammude Sahityam, Nammude Samooham (1901-2000) (Our Literature, Our Society (1901-2000) published by the Kerala Sahitya Akademy in 4 volumes.
- General Editor of the collected works of eminent scholar M.N.Vijayan, published by Current Books, Trichur, in 2001. The revised edition of the same work is to be published by the State Institute of Language soon.
- Editor of the souvenir published in connection with the 125th anniversary of Govt Brennen College, Thalassery, in 2016.
- Guest Editor of Samayam Magazine published from Kannur.

== Awards ==
1. "Ottayante Pappan" – won the first prize in the short story competition for college students conducted by Mathrubhumi weekly in connection with the Vishu Special (1971)
2. Pulijanmam won the first prize in the state level drama competition conducted by Kerala Sangeetha Nataka Akademi (1987)
3. Pulijanmam won Cherukad Award and the Kerala Sahithya Akademi Award (1987)
4. The film Pulijanmam based on the drama of the same name won the National Film Award for Best Feature Film in 2006
5. The short story "Pigman" won the Katha (New Delhi) Award (1994)
6. Pattiam Gopalan Smaraka Award (1995)
7. The short story collection Rathrimozhi won Kerala Sahithya Akademi Award (1996)
8. The short story collection Mayamayan won V.K.Unnikrishnan Memorial Award (2000)
9. Novel Thiyyor Rekhakal won the first EMS Memorial Award of Munnad EMS Smaraka Trust (2005)
10. U P Jayaraj Award (2007)
11. Novel Jeevante Thelivukal won Melur Damodaran Sahithya Puraskaram (2008)
12. Thiranjetutha Kathakal (Selected Stories) won the first Vaikom Muhammad Basheer Smaraka Sahithya Award (2009)
13. Novel "Janakdha" bagged Malayattoor Award (2010)
14. 21st Muttathu Varkey Memorial Award (2011)
15. The short story "Kulipathalam" won the Padmarajan Award 2017
16. Alakkode Sargavedi-Navarathna Award-2019
17. The novel 'Mayamanushyar' won the Odakkuzhal Award-2019
18. Crossword Book Award for Diary of a Malayali Mad Man, translated by Jayasree Kalathil- 2020
19. Dharmadam Bank M P Kumaran Award 2023 for the author's comprehensive contribution to Malayalam literature
20. Novel "Mayamanushyar" bagged Kendra Sahitya Akademi Award (2025)

== School of Literature ==
An informal literature appreciation course to enrich the literary sensibility of readers and provide them meaningful insights on various genres of literature, literary movements, objectives of literature, benefits of literature, evolution of literary forms and evolving trends in literature is offered by N Prabhakaran. The six-day talk series titled 'Sahithya Padasala' (School of Literature) started at Alakkode in Kannur district in July 2017 under the auspices of Alakkode Readers Forum is considered as the pioneering endeavor in Kerala offering informal education in literature. Classes, discussions and training in creative writing are provided by the writer. The school of literature was also launched at the writer's native place Madayi in August 2017.

== Translated works ==
N Prabhakaran's stories were translated into many languages, including Tamil, Telugu, Tulu, Kannada, Marathi, Hindi, Urdu, English and German. The short story "Daivathinte Poombatta"(Butterfly of the God) is his most translated and most anthologized work.

HarperCollins India published his fiction in English 'Diary of a Malayali Madman' translated from Malayalam by Jayasree Kalathil in February 2019.

Harper Perennial India published his novel in English Theeyoor Chronicles translated from Malayalam by Jayasree Kalathil in April 2021.

== Politics ==
Prabhakaran was associated with Leftist cultural and political organisations in early years. He was the first Kannur district secretary of Balasangam, one of the largest children organisations in India. He was the chairman candidate of Students' Federation of India (SFI) at Brennen College in 1974. Prabhakaran was also associated with the launching of Student magazine of SFI. During the period of The Emergency (India) Prabhakaran was part of the outfit Students for Human Rights. At present he is associated with All India Forum Right to Education. The writer dissociates from political affiliations of late.

== Controversy ==
N. Prabhakaran's short story "Kaliyezhuthu" which was published in Mathrubhumi weekly in December 2017 invited vehement criticism from a section of school teachers in Kerala as the story was critical of the new pedagogy and the teachers' training sessions implemented in the state. While a section of teachers and educationists argued that the story exposed the pitfalls in the school education system, the others went on airing harsh comments on the writer that raised many concerns on freedom of expression.
