= Meesa =

2018 novel by Malayalam author S. Hareesh

- Author: S. Hareesh
- Language: Malayalam
- Genre: Novel
- Published: 2018 (D.C. Books)
- Publication place: India
- ISBN: 978-8-126-47737-1

Meesa (English: Moustache) is the debut novel of Malayalam writer S. Hareesh. It was serialised in parts by the Mathrubhumi Illustrated Weekly and published in its entirety by DC Books. Due to protests from Hindu organisations, the serialisation was cancelled after the third part. The novel was translated into English by Jayasree Kalathil under the title Moustache.

== Award ==
The English translation of the book, Moustache, won the JCB Prize for literature in 2020. The novel won the 2019 Kerala Sahitya Akademi Award for Novel, which was announced in February 2021.

== Withdrawal ==
In a section of the novel, a certain character suggests that Hindu women bathe and wear good clothes before going to a temple because they are interested in sex. He goes on to state that women do not go to the temple whilst menstruating because they cannot have sex. These extracts, which were shared on social media, resulted in widespread criticism by Hindu organisations such as Yogakshema Sabha, Hindu Aikya Vedi, N.S.S. After this, the writer withdrew the serialisation of the novel from Mathrubhumi Illustrated Weekly.

== In Court ==
A plea to ban the book was made to the Supreme Court of India by N Radhakrishnan, a resident of Delhi. The court refused to ban the novel and stated that the culture of banning books impacts the free flow of ideas.
