= Slap kabaddi =

Variant of kabaddi

Slap kabaddi or thappad kabaddi is a Pakistani variant of kabaddi which is particularly popular in Punjab. Two players aim to slap each other, scoring one point for each slap landed on the opponent; the winner is the one who scores the most points, or who can force his opponent to forfeit the match.

Punches are not allowed, though players can slam into each other. There is no time limit or limit to the number of slaps that can be executed, though causing injury to the opponent results in disqualification in some matches.,

== Names ==
Slap kabaddi is also known as chandd kabaddi or tamachedar kabaddi.

== See also ==
- Panja (game)
- Slapboxing
- Vajra-mushti
