= Slapboxing =

Form of play fighting which involves the use of open hands

Slapboxing (or slap-boxing) is a physical activity somewhat simulating boxing, where open handed slaps are used instead of fists. This is a quasi-martial art form, at an intersection between sparring and fighting, and is usually performed in an ad hoc or informal manner, or when boxing protective gear is unavailable. Although a popular pastime in some circles, it is generally considered a competitive sport, but also a game or training drill.

Several rappers including Pharoahe Monch, Noreaga, Killarmy, Eminem, Ice Cube, R.A. the Rugged Man, and Brother Ali have songs in which they reminisce about slapboxing. Author Victor D. LaValle wrote the critically acclaimed Slapboxing with Jesus, a story about teenagers living in Queens, New York. The book's title is a take on a line from Ghostface Killah's Daytona 500.

In a 2004 Dateline NBC interview, singer Bobby Brown claimed to have been slapboxing with Whitney Houston when it turned violent.

== See also ==
- Slap kabaddi
