= Neendoor =

Neendoor Kottayam
- Town
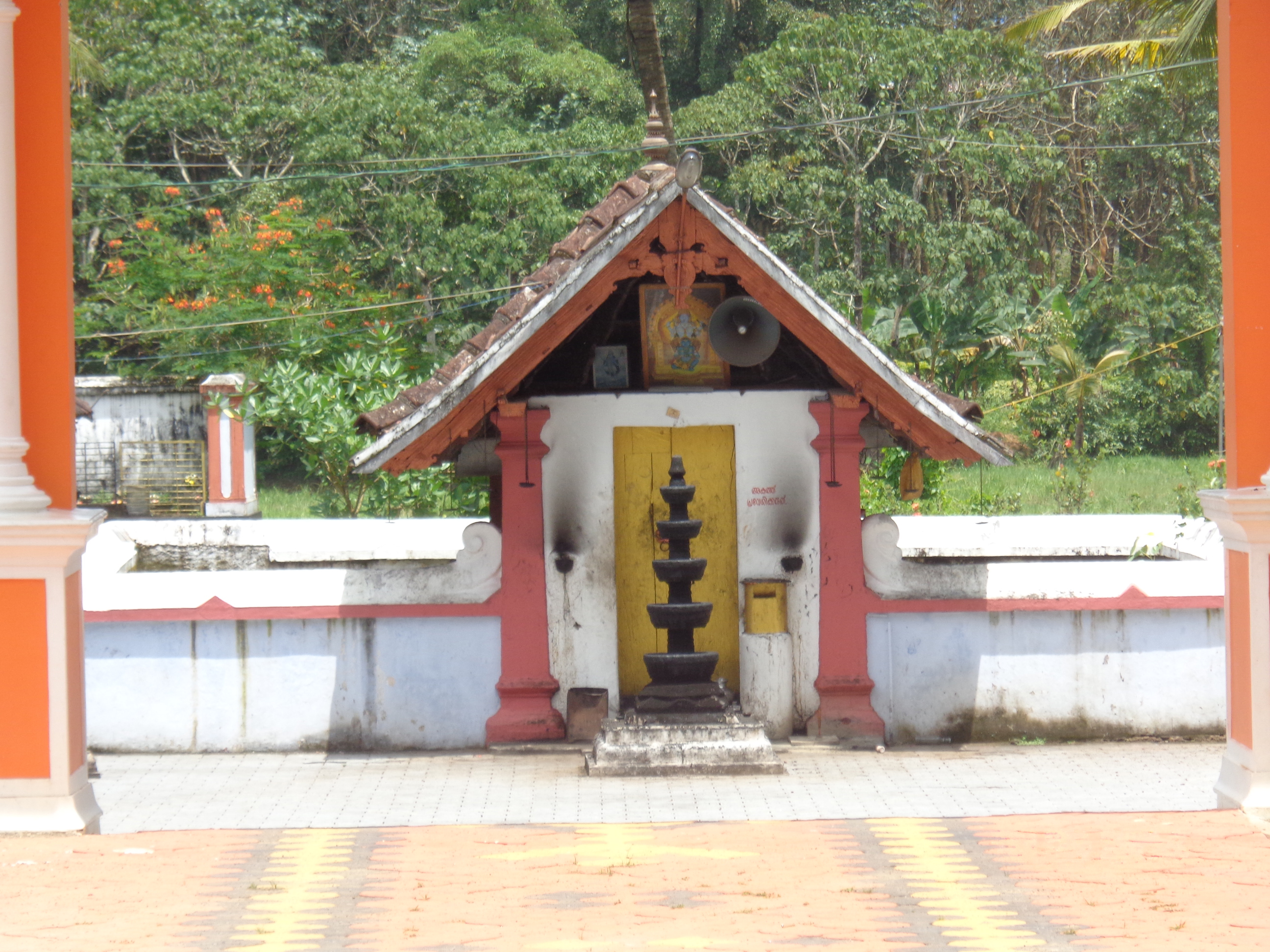
- Devi Temple, Neendoor
- Interactive map of Neendoor
- Coordinates: 9°40′42″N 76°30′20″E
- Country: India
- State: Kerala
- District: Kottayam

Languages
  - Official: Malayalam, English
- Time zone: UTC+5:30 (IST)
- PIN: 686601

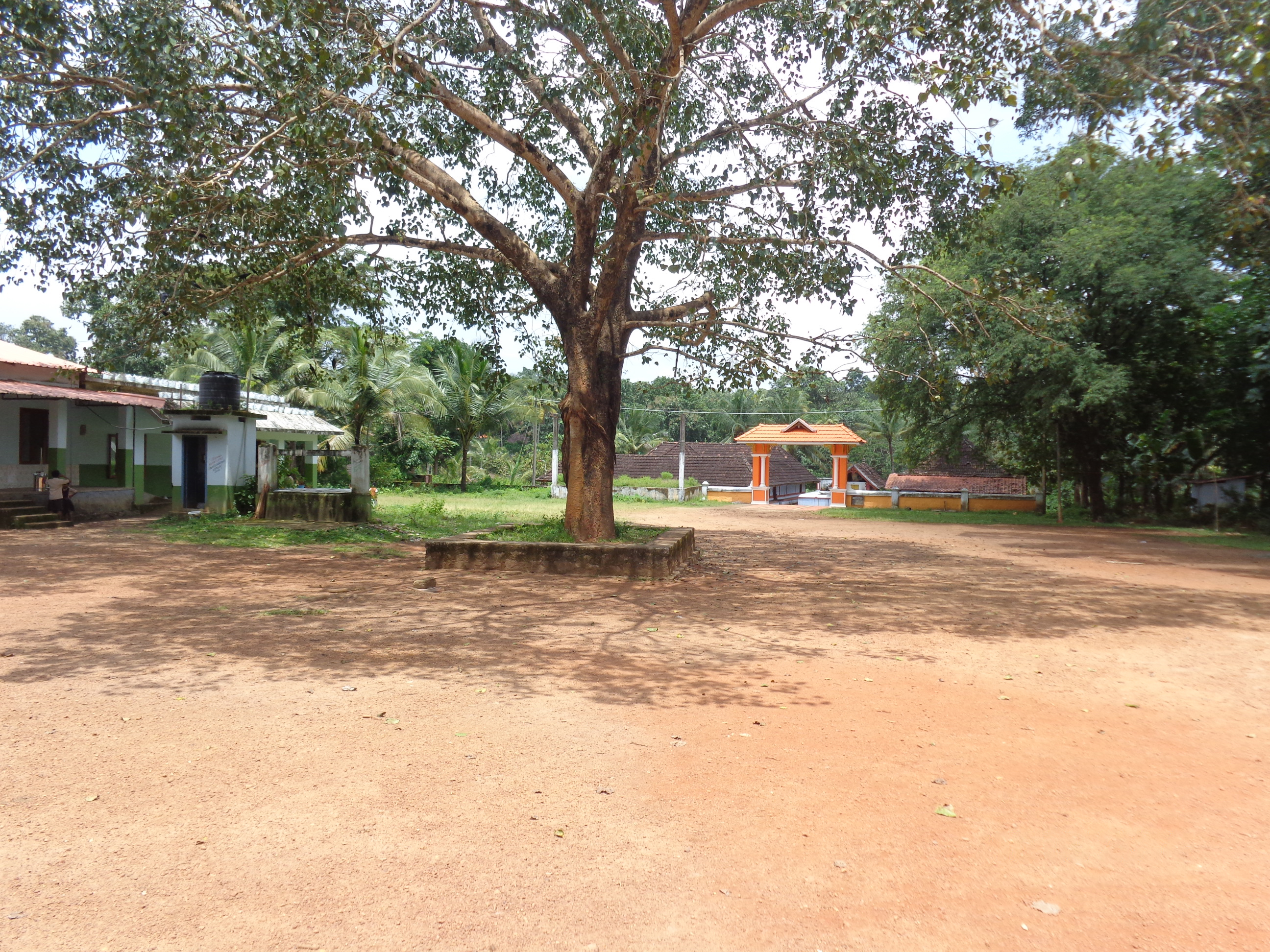
Moozhikulangara temple

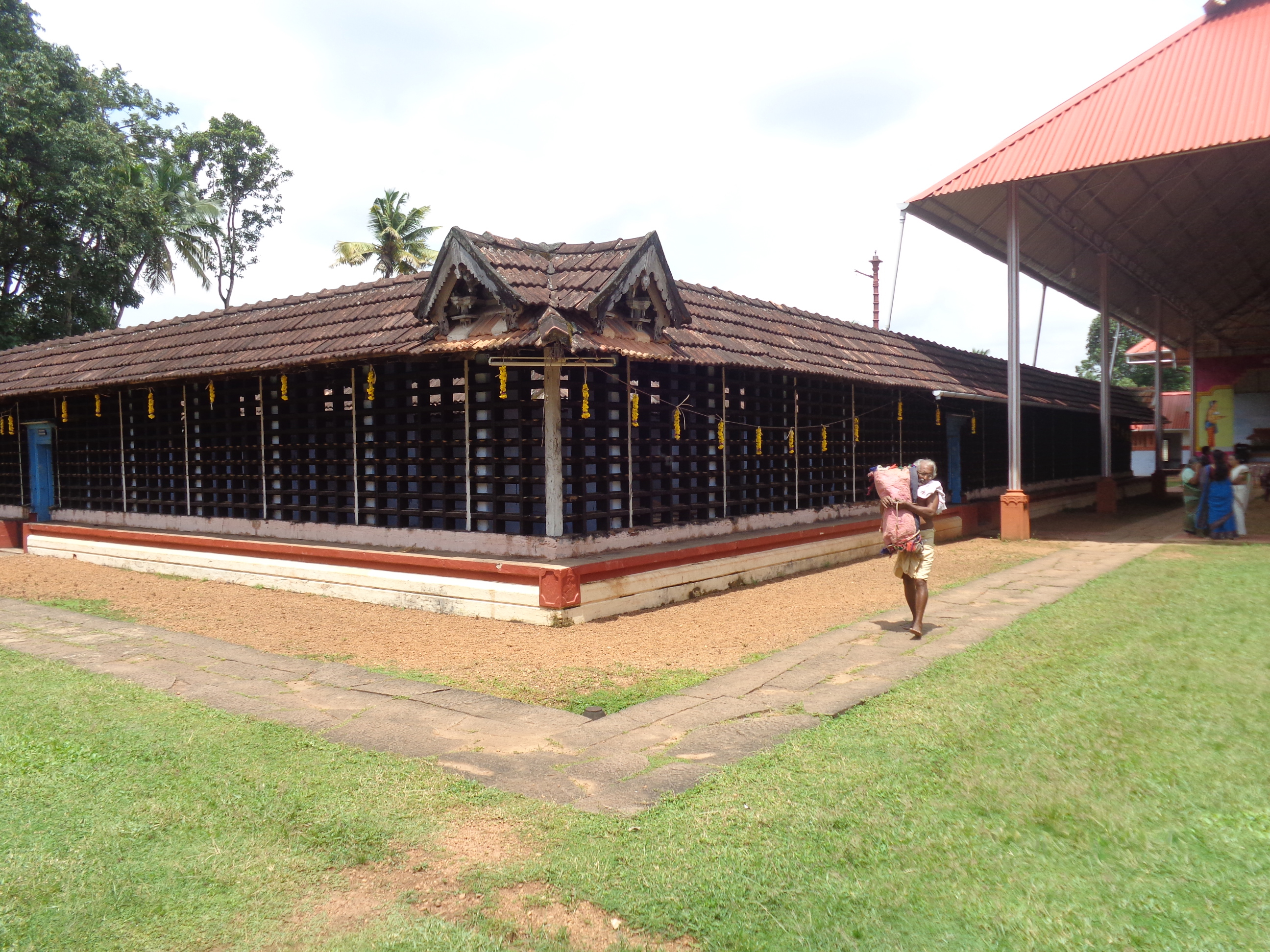
Onamthuruth Temple

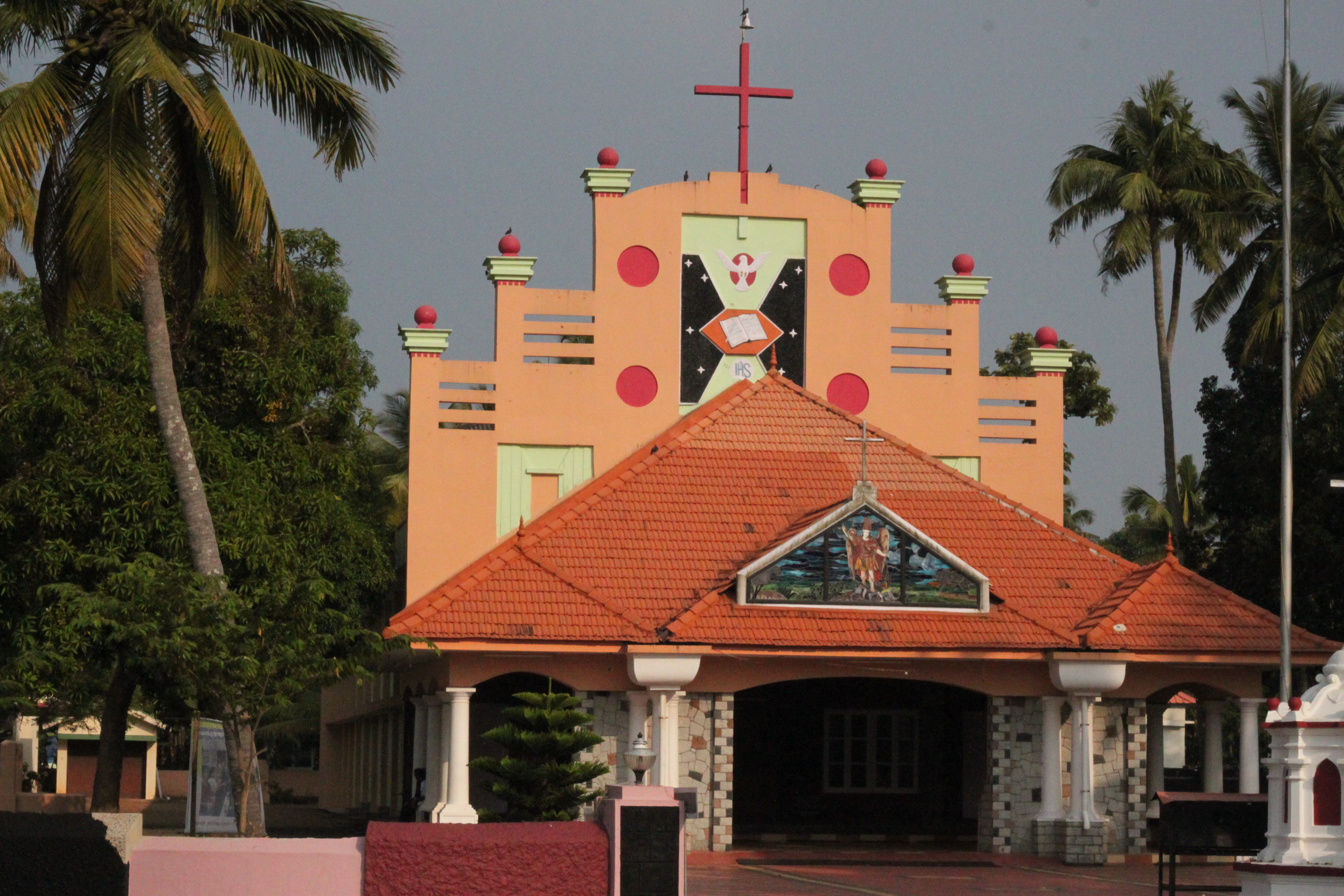
St.Michael Church

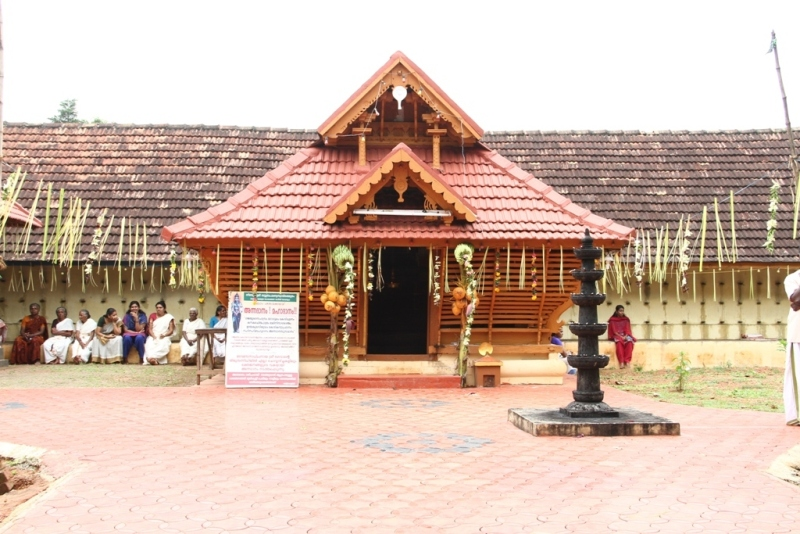
Subramanya Temple

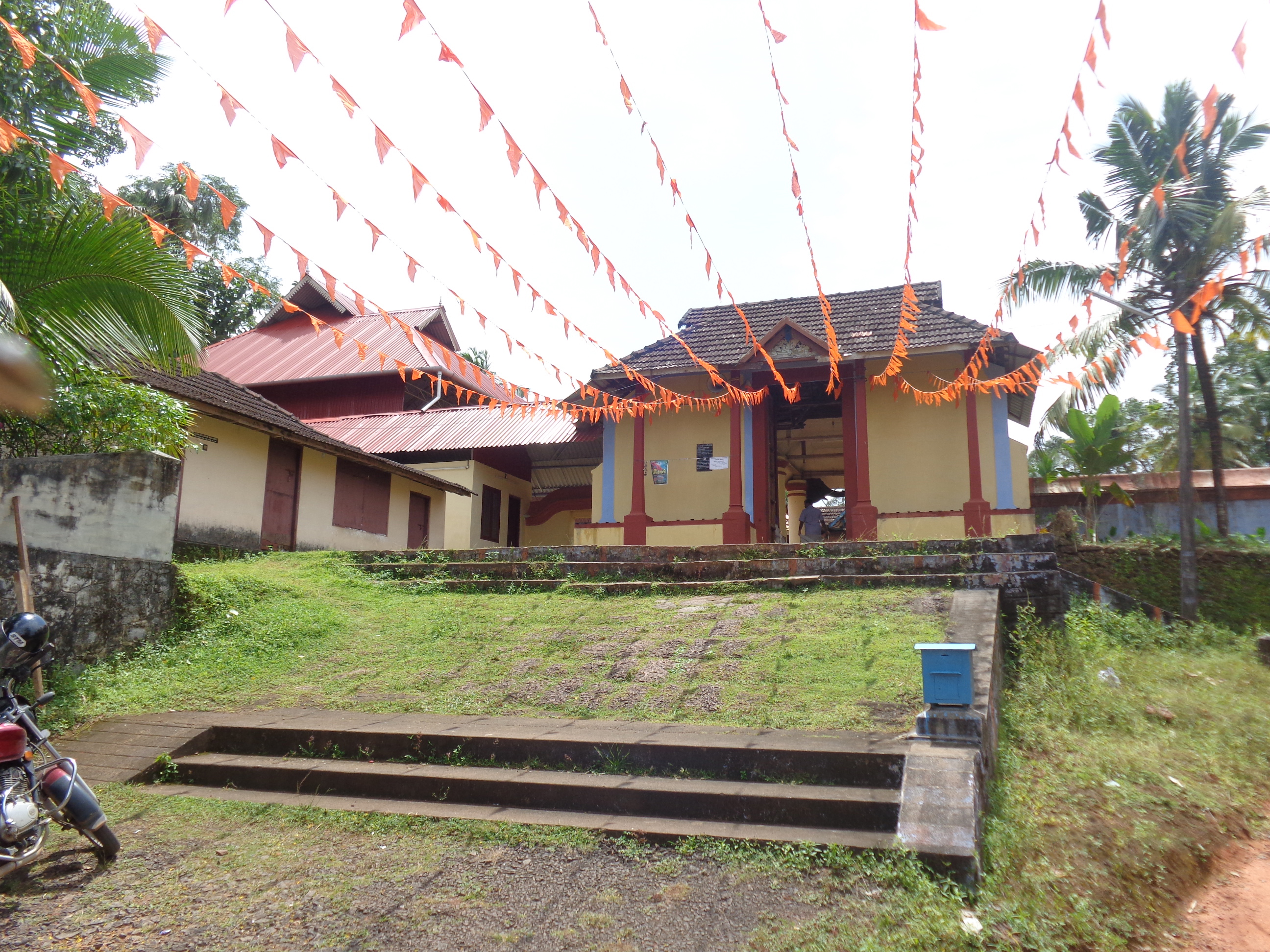
Krishna Temple

Neendoor is a very small town in the Kottayam district in Kerala, India. The town is located 8 km north of Kottayam town, and is bordered by the towns of Kaipuzha, Athirampuzha, Kallara, Manjoor, Vechoor, and Onamthuruthu.

== Geography ==
Needoor is on the northern border of "Kuttanadu," 16 km from Kottayam and 7.5 km from Ettumanoor. In old days, say up until the early 1990s, the "punchapadam" (rice fields) gave a distinct Kuttandu look for Neendoor. The greenery is still there, what are missing are rice fields and farming. The income comes now mostly from non-farming.

== Economy ==
In terms of pure currency in-flow, money sent by ex-pats play a huge role (Middle East, USA, UK, Australia etc.) . Rubber is Neendoor's major cash crop. Up until the late 1970s, rice was a major cash crop as well. However, in the last several decades, the local economy has increasingly been bolstered by cash sent by Indian expatriates living in the Middle East, the United States, the United Kingdom, and Australia. This foreign support has contributed to the town's development in recent years - for example, with large mansions replacing the existing small houses. For whatever reason, many expatriates who worked out of state or out of country all their working life come back to Neendoor at retirement and prefer to build a house in the already crowded neighborhood.

== Demographics ==
The population of Neendoor is primarily of Hindus and Knanaya Catholics. The famous lord Muruga temple Neendoor Subrahmanya Swami Temple is located in this place. The patron saint of the area is St. Michael, after whom the local parish church is named. Fr. Shaji Vadakkethotty is the present parish priest who is also the superior of missionaries of St. Pius X, Arch Eparchy of Kottayam and former forane vicar of Holy Family Forane Church, Rajapuram. With the increase in automobile population, gone are the days of quite streets and all people walking to church for Sunday masses. A significant percentage of Neendoor's residents of Kna heritage has migrated to the US, Australia and the UK in the last few decades. With the privatization of professional colleges many and attending engineering and other technical schools lately. One of the recent trends is the younger generation pursuing medical careers (such as nursing, or X-ray technician) and to find a job abroad.
