= Jayasree Kalathil =

Indian writer, translator, mental health researcher and activist

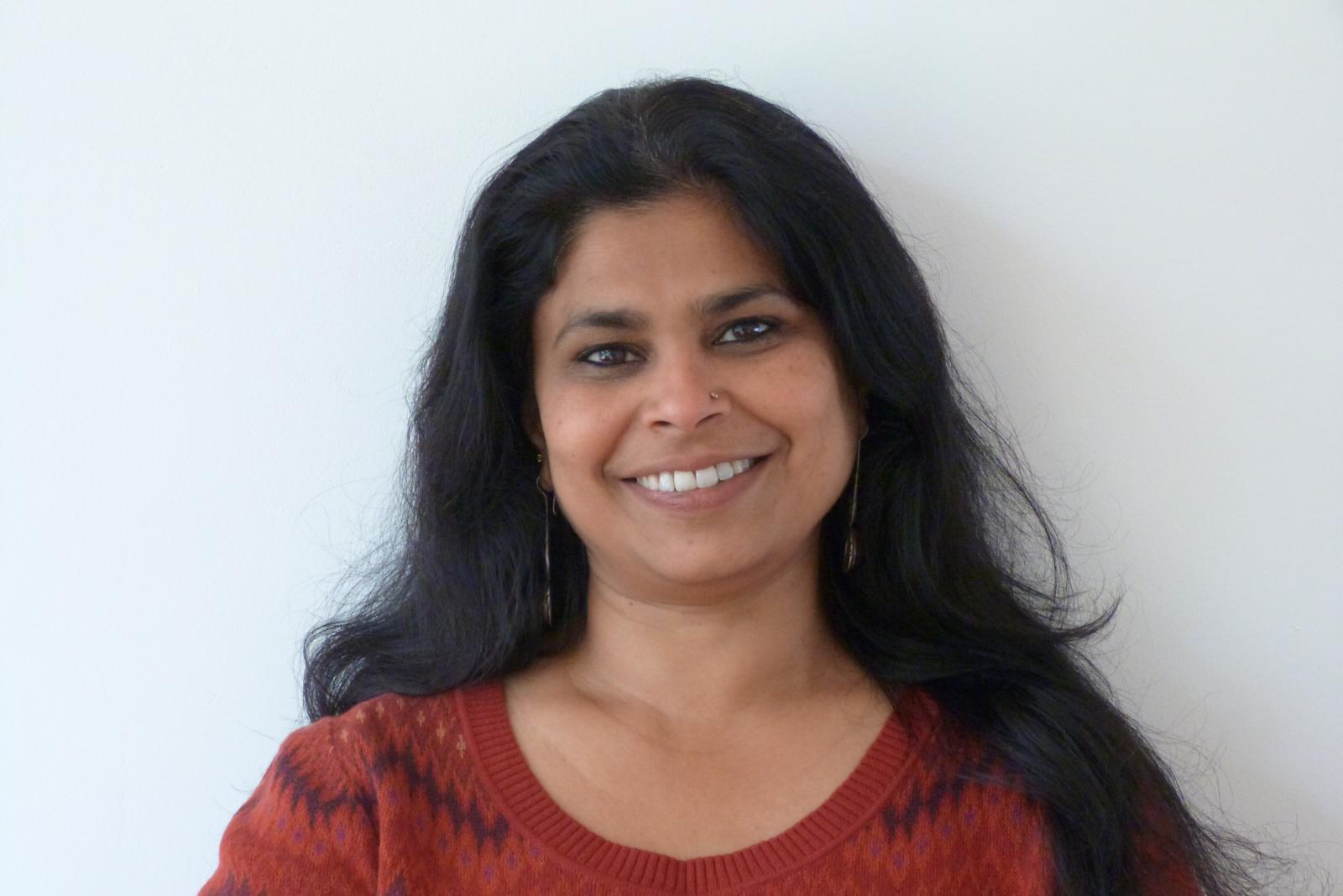
- Dr. Jayasree Kalathil
- Born: Kottakkal, Malappuram, Kerala, India
- Education: Farook College; English and Foreign Languages University
- Occupations: Writer, translator, researcher, activist
- Notable work: Moustache; Diary of a Malayali Madman; The Sackclothman; Values and Ethics in Mental Health; Adam; Valli, A Novel
- Awards: 2011 MHF Janice Sinson Research Prize; 2020 Crossword Book Award; 2020 JCB Prize for Literature

Jayasree Kalathil is an Indian writer, translator, mental health researcher and activist. She is known for her work in the area of mental health activism as well as for her translations of Malayalam works, The Diary of a Malayali Madman and Moustache, the former winning Crossword Book Award and the latter, the JCB Prize for Literature, both in 2020. Her latest work, Valli, A Novel was among the works shortlisted for the JCB Prize for Literature in 2022.

== Biography ==
Jayasree Kalathil was born in Kottakkal, a town in Malappuram district of the south Indian state of Kerala. After completing college education at Farook College, Kozhikode, and the Department of English, University of Calicut, she pursued her research at the English and Foreign Languages University, Hyderabad under the guidance of the noted activist and writer, Susie Tharu, which earned her a doctoral degree. Before moving to the UK, she worked as a researcher at Bapu Trust for Research on Mind & Discourse, Pune, Infochange India, Pune, and as a research fellow on mental health at Anveshi Research Centre for Women's Studies, Hyderabad.

Jayasree Kalathil lives in London.

== Work in mental health and anti-racism ==
Kalathil has been involved with the international psychiatric survivors movement since the 1990s and her initial work in this area was around women's mental distress and its representation in literature and cinema. At 'Bapu Trust', Pune, she served as the founding editor of Aaina, the first Indian newsletter dedicated to mental health advocacy. After moving to the UK, she worked as a researcher at the Mental Health Media, London, and the Centre for Mental Health, London. In 2007, she set up the virtual collective, Survivor Research, a platform for research, activism and advocacy to highlight and challenge the institutional racism embedded in psychiatric practice and knowledge. She has worked as a consultant policy advisor at the Afiya Trust, London, an organization combatting racial inequalities in health, simultaneously managing 'Catch-a-Fiya', a national network of mental health service users and survivors from racially minoritised communities in the UK, and the National BME Mental Health Advocacy Project. She also co-chaired the Social Perspectives Network from 2009 to 2012, and served as the editor of 'Open Mind', a mental health magazine during 2010–2012.

In 2012, Kalathil was one of the four coordinators of 'The Inquiry into the ‘Schizophrenia’ Label', a campaign which aimed to question the usefulness of ‘schizophrenia’ as a diagnosis and medical condition, and investigated the impact this diagnosis on people's lives. She was one of the founding editors, with Jhilmil Breckenridge, of 'Mad in Asia Pacific', an online platform, founded in 2018, for voices from the Asia-Pacific region that offer a critical examination and rethinking of mental health, madness and disability. She is also involved with a project mapping the knowledge produced by psychiatric survivors and persons with psychosocial disabilities.

As a survivor researcher, Kalathil has written about the experiences of people at the intersection of madness and racism. Her study, Recovery and Resilience, explored the personal experiences of mental distress and recovery of Black and Asian women in the UK, narrated through life story narrative interviews, and Dancing to Our Own Tunes, a review done by her, deals with the experiences of Black and Asian mental health service users within the survivor movement and its user involvement spaces; the report subsequently came up for discussion in the UK Parliament. She has also co-authored a textbook, Values and Ethics in Mental Health: An Exploration for Practice.

== Literary career ==
Kalathil is the author of The Sackclothman, a book for children under the 'Different Tales' project, which has since been translated into Indian languages such as Hindi, Telugu and Malayalam. In 2019, HarperCollins published her work, Diary of a Malayali Madman, the translation of five novellas, written by Malayalam writer, N. Prabhakaran. The publishing company contracted her again for the translation of Meesha, a controversial novel written by S. Hareesh which was subsequently published under the title, Moustache in 2020.

== Awards and honors ==
In 2011, the Mental Health Foundation selected Kalathil's work on the Recovery and Resilience project for the Janice Sinson Research Prize. She received the Crossword Book Award in 2020, for Diary of a Malayali Madman, the translation of N. Prabhakaran's novellas. In the same year, Moustache, her translation of Meesha, by S. Hareesh, fetched her the JCB Prize for Literature, arguably the literary award in India with the largest winner's purse. Valli, A Novel also featured in the shortlist for JCB Prize for Literature in 2022. She has also been included in the initial shortlist for the 2026 PEN Presents award for her current translation work, Silk Worm, Malayalam original written by S. Hareesh.

== Selected publications ==
=== Original works ===
- Kalathil, Jayasree (2008). The Sackclothman. Kottayam: D.C. Books. ISBN 978-81-264-2032-2. OCLC 838341206.
- Kalathil, Jayasree (2008). Chakkupranthan. Kottayam: D.C. Books. ISBN 978-81-264-2023-0.
- Kalathil, Jayasree (2008). Gonnesanchi Abbayi. Translated by Singaraju, Ramadevi. Hyderabad: Anveshi Research Centre for Women’s Studies. ISBN 978-81-907042-3-6.
- Kalathil, Jayasree (2011). "Dancing to our own tunes: Reassessing black and minority ethnic mental health service user involvement". National Survivor User Network.
- Kalathil, Jayasree (2011). Recovery and resilience: African, African-Caribbean and South Asian women's narratives of recovering from mental distress. Mental Health Foundation.
- Morgan, Alastair; Felton, Anne; Fulford, Bill; Kalathil, Jayasree; Stacey, Gemma (3 November 2015). Values and ethics in mental health : an exploration for practice. London. ISBN 978-1-137-38258-0. OCLC 909321183.
- Kalathil, Jayasree (2008). Borewala. Translated by Sablok, Shashi. Bhopal: Eklavya. ISBN 978-93-85236-44-0.

=== Translated works ===
- Tomy, Sheela; Kalathil Jayasree (2022). Valli A Novel. India: HarperCollins India. p. 420. ISBN 978-9356290150.
- Hareesh, S.; Kalathil Jayasree (2021). Adam. India: Vintage. p. 192. ISBN 978-0670094608.
- Hareesh, S.; Kalathil Jayasree (2019). Moustache. India: HarperCollins India. p. 360. ISBN 978-93-5357-602-8. OCLC 1134444334.
- Pr̲abhākaran, N.; Kalathil, Jayasree (2019). Diary of a Malayali Madman. Uttar Pradesh: Harper Perennial India. p. 260. ISBN 978-93-5302-675-2. OCLC 1103920622.
- Mary, Sandhya; Kalathil, Jayasree (2024). Maria, Just Maria. Uttar Pradesh: Harper Perennial India. p. 247. ISBN 978-9356993907.
- Jose, Jisa; Kalathil, Jayasree (2025). Mudritha - A Novel. Uttar Pradesh: Harper Perennial India. p. 305. ASIN B0DQR1TFVQ.
- Hareesh, S.; Kalathil Jayasree (2026). August 17. India: HarperCollins India. p. 446. ISBN 978-9369897162.

=== Articles ===
- Cosgrove, Lisa; Mills, China; Karter, Justin M.; Mehta, Akriti; Kalathil, Jayasree (19 October 2020). "A critical review of the Lancet Commission on global mental health and sustainable development: Time for a paradigm change". Critical Public Health. 30 (5): 624–631. doi:10.1080/09581596.2019.1667488. ISSN 0958-1596. S2CID 204383658.
- Rose, Diana; Kalathil, Jayasree (16 July 2019). "Power, Privilege and Knowledge: the Untenable Promise of Co-production in Mental "Health"". Frontiers in Sociology. 4 57. doi:10.3389/fsoc.2019.00057. ISSN 2297-7775. PMC 8022626. PMID 33869380.
- Kalathil, Jayasree (2019). Breckenridge, J; Kathait, N (eds.). Side effects of living : an anthology of voices on mental health. New Delhi: Speaking Tiger Publishing Pvt Ltd & Women Unlimited. ISBN 978-93-85606-20-5. OCLC 1135384224.
- Kalathil, Jayasree (2015). Davar, B; Ravindran, S (eds.). Ideological reproduction of gender and normality in psychiatric drug advertisements. New Delhi: Oxford University Press. ISBN 9780199453535.
- Kalathil, Jayasree; Jones, Nev (2016). "Unsettling Disciplines: Madness, Identity, Research, Knowledge". Philosophy, Psychiatry, & Psychology. 23 (3–4): 183–188. doi:10.1353/ppp.2016.0016. ISSN 1086-3303. S2CID 151677845.
- Kalathil, Jayasree (2015). "Unmodified ECT: Challenging the call to continue an inhumane practice" (PDF). Medico Friend Circle Bulletin: 33–35.
- Faulkner, Alison C.; Kalathil, Jayasree (January 2015). "Racialisation and knowledge production: A critique of the report 'Understanding Psychosis and Schizophrenia'". Mental Health Today, Jan-Feb, 22-23.
- Kalathil, Jayasree (2014). "An exploratory note on discrimination and 'race' in relation to mental health in the west" (PDF). Medico Friend Circle Bulletin: 357–360/75–78.
- Kalathil, Jayasree (2013). 'Hard to reach'? User involvement and racialised groups. Bristol University Press, Policy Press. doi:10.2307/j.ctt9qgmxw.13.
- Thomas, Philip; Seebohm, Patience; Wallcraft, Jan; Kalathil, Jayasree; Fernando, Suman (16 August 2013). "Personal consequences of the diagnosis of schizophrenia: a preliminary report from the inquiry into the schizophrenia label". Mental Health and Social Inclusion. 17 (3): 135–139. doi:10.1108/MHSI-05-2013-0013. ISSN 2042-8308.
- Fernando, Suman; Kalathil, Jayasree (January 2012). "Questioning 'schizophrenia'". Open Mind, 172.
- Kalathil, Jayasree (2010). "After Ervadi: Healing and human rights in the context of mental health. In S Tharu, R Srivatsan and A Zachariah (eds.) Towards a critical medical practice: Reflections on the dilemmas of medical culture today". Orient Blackswan, Hyderabad. ISBN 978-8125040910.
- Bennet, Joanna; Kalathil, Jayasree; Keating, Frank (2008). "Race equality training in the UK: A historical overview. In S Fernando and F Keating (eds.) Mental health in a multi-ethnic society: A multi-disciplinary handbook". Hove: Routledge. ISBN 9780415414876.
- Kalathil, Jayasree (2001). "Inscribing madness: Another reading of The Yellow Wallpaper and The Bell Jar". In B Davar (ed.). Mental health from a gender perspective. New Delhi: Sage. ISBN 978-0761994770.

== See also ==
- S. Hareesh
- N. Prabhakaran
- Susie Tharu
