= Mathrubhumi Azhchappathippu =

Indian weekly magazine

- Editor In Charge: M. P. Gopinath
- Categories: General interest magazine
- Frequency: Weekly
- Publisher: M N Ravi Varma
- First issue: 18 January 1932; 94 years ago
- Company: Mathrubumi Printing and Publishing Company Limited
- Country: India
- Language: Malayalam

Mathrubhumi Azhchappathippu (English: Mathrubhumi Illustrated Weekly) is an Indian general-interest weekly magazine published by the Mathrubhumi Printing and Publishing Company in Kozhikode. The Malayalam-language magazine started publishing on 18 January 1932.

Some of the finest literary work in Malayalam language was initially published in Mathrubhumi Illustrated Weekly, including Uroob's Ummachu (1954), Thakazhi Sivasankara Pillai's Enippadikal (1964), O. V. Vijayan's Khasakkinte Itihasam (1968) and M. Mukundan's Mayyazhippuzhayude Theerangalil (1974). Authors such as M. T. Vasudevan Nair and N. V. Krishna Warrier served as the editors of the magazine.

The magazine carries political commentaries, literary works and columns on science, films and literature. Prominent writer Ramachandra Guha, biologist Krishna Anujan, E P Rajagopalan are among the columnists.

== History ==
Mathrubhumi Illustrated Weekly's parent company, Mathrubhumi, is based in the northern Kerala town of Kozhikode and was founded in 1922 as a public limited company following the rise of Mahatma Gandhi's non-cooperation movement. This independent status makes Mathrubhumi unique in India, where most media outlets and publications tend to be tightly held private companies owned by a single powerful family. On 18 January 1932, the first issue of Mathrubhumi Illustrated Weekly was published. The issue focused on matters like Indian nationalism, humanity and fiction. Mahatma Gandhi was featured as the first cover photo due to his influence on the company and the editors' desire for the magazine to emanate his political teachings. The weekly spanned 26 pages and cost 2 annas. In the opening section of the magazine, the editors declared their mission statement followed by the first featured Malayalam literature, Ahimsa, a poem by Vallathol. Articles including 'Paschyatharude Lingabandha Jeevitham' and column 'Rasikarasayanam' by Kesari Balakrishna Pillai appeared in the first edition. This first issue of Mathrubhumi Illustrated Weekly is a truncated version of how the magazine is structured today with editorials from various Keralan figures, poems, book reviews and extracts of Malayalam literature.

Kerala has played a major role in the formation of Mathrubhumi. The region is a southern state in India formed in 1956, with a communist-led government assuming office in 1957. This makes the state home to one of the earliest elected communist governments in the world. Kerala has far higher rates of literacy compared to other Indian states. This makes it privy to publications like Mathrubhumi Illustrated Weekly, that are focused on texts that provoke and challenge the wider Indian audience. Upon its conception in 1932, the magazine was considered the mouthpiece of India's freedom movement. This has been a key tenet in its mission statement and a driving factor in remaining a rare independent media outlet in Kerala.

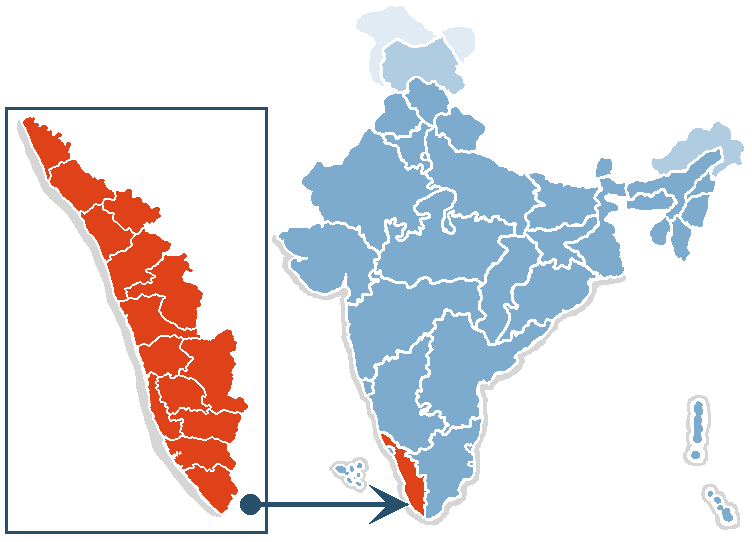
Location of the State of Kerala in India.Mathrubhumi Illustrated Weekly is published in the Keralan locality of Calicut.

Kerala as a region has a strong association with the Indian freedom movement of the early to mid-20th century . In 1942 the Mathrubhumi editor K. A. Damodara Menon was arrested for his role in the Quit India movement. The arrest by British-backed Indian officials came alongside a slew of actions, including the deportation of Swadeshabhimani Ramakrishna Pillai in 1910, the banning of Kesari in 1930, and the confiscation of the properties of Malayala Manorama in 1938. Mathrubhumi Illustrated Weekly was a touchpoint for the movement supporting the dismantling of British Raj in India and played a significant role in the eventual resolution proposal. The Congress working committee met at Wardha in 1942 adopting a resolution to demand complete independence from the British Government. This draft proposed large scale protests and riots if the British did not accept the demands. It was eventually passed in Mumbai.

The weekly's role in the formation and development of a public literary community in Malabar-northern Kerala is substantial. The Communist-led region had once been under the rule of the Madras Presidency, and following its disestablishment in 1947 established reading rooms and acted as a literacy facilitator. However, the Malayalam identity was still shaped by issues of caste, class, gender, and religion. The circulation of Mathrubhumi Illustrated Weekly is cited as being a core actor in shifting the Keralan population from such traditionalist ideologies. This shift influenced the push for public reading spaces throughout this period.

The early issues of Mathrubhumi Illustrated Weekly witnessed the rise and fall of poet's Edapally Raghavan Pillai's work, having a substantial impact on his early career. The writer is among many that were afforded an audience by Mathrubhumi Illustrated Weekly, with the publication facilitating the early careers of many authors and literary contributors in India.

In the 1950s and 1960s Mathrubhumi Illustrated Weekly played a substantial role in the formation and early establishment of a democratic Indian government. The magazine's influence as a mouthpiece for the Indian independence movement earlier in the century led them to eventually be an agent supporting trade unions and elected figures in both parliament and various industries.

The magazine upholds its interests in politics and literacy from great Malayalam minds, including prominent writer Ramachandra Guha and biologist Krishna Anujan. Currently its managing editor P. V. Chandran continues to uphold the magazine's mission statement promoting literary freedom and creative expression in a media landscape fraught with familial ties and restrictive commercial obligations.

== Content and format ==
Mathrubhumi Illustrated is published weekly and is one of the top circulating literary magazines in the Indian State of Kerala consisting of Malayalam short stories, novels, travel diaries, interviews, and editorials. Mathrubhumi states that their weekly publication "is the mirror image of Malayalam literature" and strives to showcase "Kerala's intellectual depth". Book reviews have been a mainstay of the publication since its inception, having 'best book' and 'best author' awards given out annually. Special editions of the magazine are also released on occasion with the most recent edition, Mathrubhumi at 100 years, celebrating the centenary of the Mathrubhumi company in March 2022.

Mathrubhumi Illustrated Weekly also publishes comic strips in a serialised format. The magazine published the nation's first graphic novel. Keralan filmmaker, comic artist, and painter G. Aravindan issued a comic strip called Cheriya Manushyarum, Valiya Lokavam translating to 'Small Men and the Big World' in the weekly magazine. The piece was published in a serialised format from 1961 to 1973. It is considered India's first graphic novel and also "the first time the Malayali reader sensed time in a cartoon strip" according to Indian billionaire and business leader Kris Gopalakrishnan.

Interviews in the magazine often focus on literary and political figures from Kerala and the surrounding Indian regions. Most interviews explore political issues whilst profiling a notable individual who presents their view on the matter. For example, Mathrubhumi Illustrated Weekly's interview with central secretariat member of the Dalit Human Rights Movement, Seleena Prakkanam, investigates struggles with leadership in Indian politics and caste issues. Interviews like this one have been a central feature of the publication.

== Controversies ==
=== Child marriage among Kerala Muslim communities ===
In 2013, the magazine played a significant role in making. public and publishing criticisms of child marriage in Kerala and the surrounding regions. Academic articles like Haneefa's 'Reflections on the Relationship between Child Marriage and Higher Education of Muslim Women in South Malabar' (2013) brought the alarming rate of child marriage in Muslim Indian communities to light, exposing fundamentalist religious communities' treatment of young women in particular. The Journal was most concerned with the lower rate of education among young women who wed when they were children. Mathrubhumi's articles 'Muslim Penkuttilakkku Vendi Oru Abhyarthana' and 'Anungalude Indiayile Pennungalude Kalyanam' both published in 2013 are cited extensively in the article and as texts that brought the issue to light in the region. Muslim communities argued that Mathrubhumi Illustrated Weekly infringed on their religious freedoms and protested the articles.

=== Meesha controversy ===
Mathrubhumi Illustrated Weekly was the subject of controversy again in 2018 upon serialising Meesha, the debut novel of Malayalam author S. Hareesh. Early in the novel a conversation takes place between two male characters in which one states that Hindu women dress up to go to temples so they can declare readiness for sexual relations. The character then continues to suggest women do not visit temples whilst menstruating because they aren't ready for sex and that Brahmin priests are notorious womanisers. This extract was shared widely on social media wherein was met with criticism from Hindu groups and leaders. Organisations such as Yogakshema Sabha, and BJP, Hindu Aikya Vedi. expressed their outrage. Protestors from these groups and other followers of the Right-Wing Sangh Parivar marched on the Mathrubhumi office in July 2018. Many political figures and notable authors came out in support of S Hareesh, such as Congress MP Shashi Tharoor came out in support of the author; "Those who do not believe my warnings about the emergence of a Hindutva Taliban might learn from what has just happened to Malayalam writer Hareesh (and even more chilling, the threat to chop off his hands, Taliban-style)". The politicisation of Meesha as well as the outrage from Hindu women and the Brahmin community led to Hareesh withdrawing the novel from Mathrubhumi Illustrated Weekly after only three chapters were published.

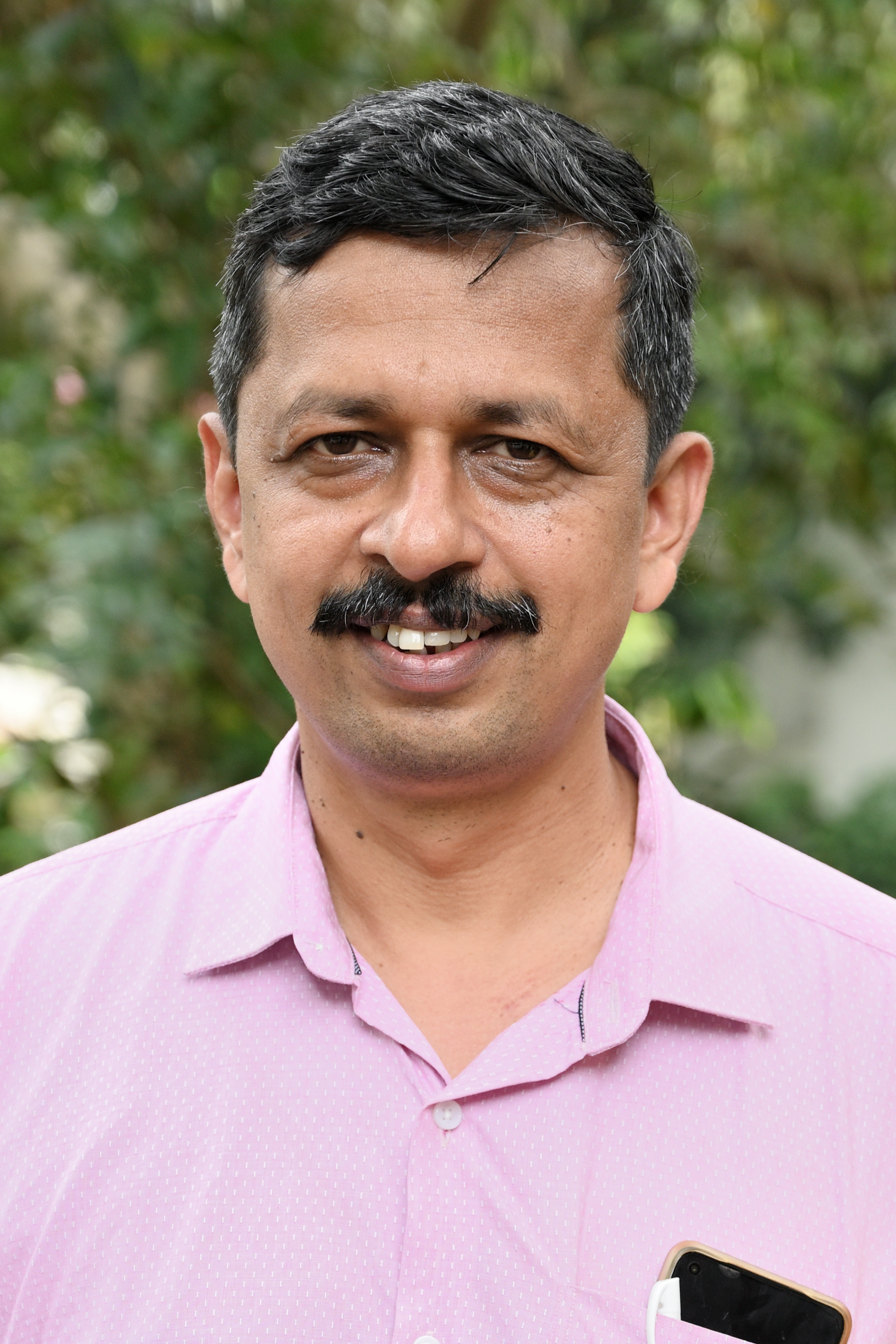
Author of the controversial serialised novel, Meesha (2022).

S. Hareesh spoke on the pulling of his serialised book from the publication in late July 2018; "My novel published in Mathrubhumi Illustrated Weekly has finished three episodes. It was a product of almost five years of hard work that revolved on my mind from childhood. But I happened to find a small portion of the novel being circulated on social media in a hateful way". The novel became available in full later that year, published by DC Books. It won the Kerala Sahitya Akademi Award for Novel in 2019 and the English translation of the book was awarded the JCB Prize for literature in 2020.

Kamalram Sajeev, who served as the editor of the weekly for 15 years, resigned from the weekly due to the controversy related to Meesha. After Ram's resignation, copy editor Manila C Mohan also left Mathrubhumi.

== Circulation ==
The magazine is distributed in both physical and digital editions, with subscriptions offered both domestically and internationally. It is released Weekly to outlets across the Kerala region and can be found throughout India at particular retailers. In the region and beyond, the publication is printed in the local language of Malayalam. The magazine has an estimated circulation of 60,000 copies sold each week and an approximate readership of 300,000.

Sister publications ofMathrubhumi Illustrated Weekly include; the women's interest magazine Grihalakshmi, the employment magazine Thozhil Vartha, Mathrubhumi's main newspaper, and the monthly sports paper Mathrubhumi Sports Masika.

Mathrubhumi Illustrated Weekly has been the number-one literary weekly in Malayalam since its launch in January 1932. Its focus on literature remains the core of the publication, but over time its focus has shifted slightly to current affairs and interviews in order to remain relevant to the intellectual population of Kerala, where the magazine is circulated most heavily.

== Key people ==
Managing editor: P. V. Chandran
Joint managing editor: P. V. Nidheesh
Editor in charge: M.P. Gopinath
Chief sub editor: Subhash Chandran Copy editors: K. C. Subi and P. K. Sreekumar
Senior artist: K. Shereef

== See also ==
- Kalakaumudi
- Bhashaposhini
- Madhyamam Weekly
