= S. Hareesh =

Indian writer

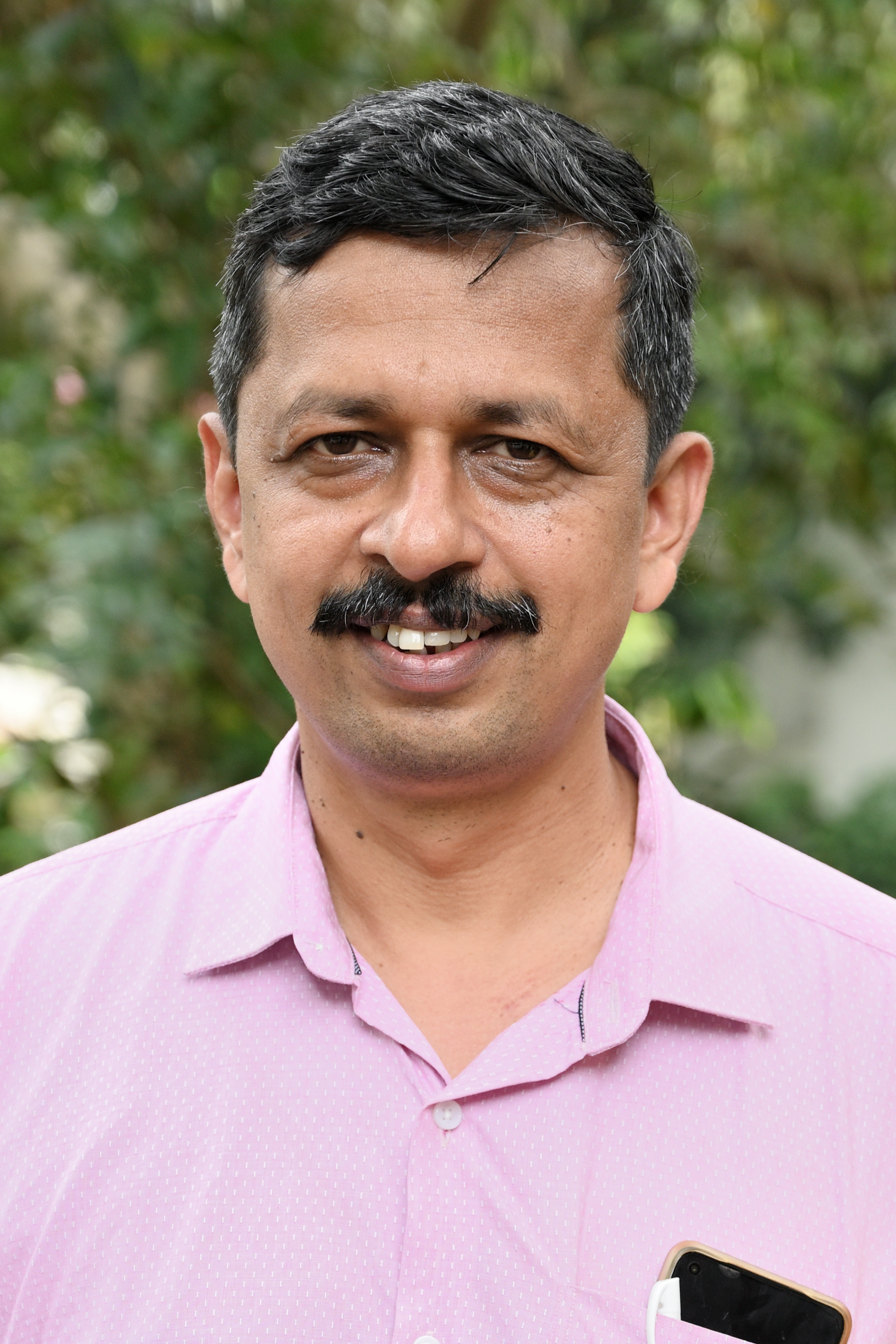
- Born: 15 May 1975 (age 51); Neendoor, Kottayam, Kerala, India
- Occupations: Writer, screenwriter
- Writing career
- Language: Malayalam
- Years active: 1995–present
- Genres: Novel, short story, translations, films
- Notable work: Meesa
- Notable awards: 2020 JCB Prize for Literature; 2020 Nandanar Award; 2019 Kerala Sahitya Akademi Award for Novel; 2018 Kerala Sahitya Akademi Award for Story; 2017 Kerala State Film Award for Best Screenplay; 2009 Thomas Mundassery Award; 2008 Kerala Sahitya Akademi Geetha Hiranyan Endowment; V. P. Sivakumar Memorial Keli Award

S. Hareesh (born 15 May 1975) is an Indian writer, translator and screenwriter of Malayalam literature and cinema. He is best known for his short stories and his acclaimed but controversial debut novel, Meesa, which explores caste in Kerala in the mid-20th century. The novel, initially serialized in the Mathrubhumi weekly, was withdrawn after protests by right-wing Hindutva groups and caste-community organizations for "maligning Hindu women and temple priests". It was later published as a full novel by DC Books. Hareesh is the recipient of several honours including the Kerala Sahitya Akademi Award for Novel and the Geetha Hiranyan Endowment of the Kerala Sahitya Akademi. In November 2020, the English translation of Meesa, titled Moustache, was selected for the JCB Prize for Literature, the Indian literary award with the highest prize money.

== Personal life & Career ==
S. Hareesh was born on 15 May 1975 at Neendoor in Kottayam district in the South Indian state of Kerala.

Hareesh published his first book in 2005, a short story anthology titled Rasavidyayude Charithram ('The History of Alchemy'), which won him the Geetha Hiranyan Endowment Award of Kerala Sahithya Akademi. This was followed by a Malayalam translation of The Last Lecture by Randy Pausch, which was published by DC Books in 2012. Four years later, he published his second short story collection titled Aadam, which won the Kerala Sahitya Akademi Award of 2016. In 2018, his debut novel, Meesa, was serialised in Mathrubhumi weekly, but he had to withdraw it due to pressures from Hindu right-wing groups. Later, the novel was published in book format by DC Books. The same year, he brought out another short story anthology, Appan. Meesa was translated by Crossword Award winner, Jayasree Kalathil and the book was published under the title, Moustache, by Harper Perennial India in 2020.

The 2018 film Aedan was based on one of the three stories in Hareesh's short story collection Adam. The story Maoist from the collection has been adapted by Lijo Jose Pellissery for his film Jallikattu, the film was India's official entry at the 2020 Academy Awards.

He is employed as a village assistant at Kaipuzha in Kottayam.

== Awards and recognition ==
Hareesh won his first major honors in 2008 when he was selected the Geetha Hiranyam Endowment by Kerala Sahitya Akademi for his short story anthology Rasavidyayude Charithram. The next year, he received the Thomas Mundassery Award for short story. He received the Kerala Sahitya Akademi Award for the Best Story Writer for his anthology, Adam in 2018. He is also a recipient of the V. P. Sivakumar Memorial Keli Award as well as the Nandanar Award in 2020. Aedan, the film based on his short story for which he wrote the screenplay fetched him the Kerala State Film Award for Best Screenplay (adapted) in 2017.

In 2020 the English translation of Meesa, titled Moustache, received the JCB Prize for Literature. The novel won another award, the 2019 Kerala Sahitya Akademi Award for Novel which was announced in February 2021.

== Bibliography ==
=== Short story anthologies ===
- Rasavidhyayude Charithram. Current Books. 2005.
- Aadam. DC Books. 2016.
- Appan. DC Books. 2018. p. 130. ISBN 978-8-126-47733-3.

=== Novels ===
- Meesa. DC Books. 2018. p. 328. ISBN 978-8-126-47737-1.
- August 17. DC Books. 2022. p. 368. ISBN 978-9-354-82575-0.
- Pattunool Puzhu. DC Books. 2024. p. 290. ISBN 978-9-364-87667-4.

=== Translations ===
- Randy Pausch; Jeffrey Zaslow. The Last Lecture [Anthyaprabhashanam] (in Malayalam). Translated by S. Hareesh. DC Books. p. 212. ISBN 978-8-126-42672-0.

=== Works available in English ===
- S. Hareesh (2020). Moustache. Translated by Jayasree Kalathil. Harper Perennial India. p. 360. ISBN 978-9-353-57602-8.

== Filmography ==
Year	Title	Screenplay	Story	Dialogues	Director
2018	Aedan	Yes	Yes	Yes	Sanju Surendran
2019	Jallikattu	Yes	Yes	Yes	Lijo Jose Pellissery
2021	Churuli	Yes	No	Yes	Lijo Jose Pellissery
2023	Nanpakal Nerathu Mayakkam	Yes	No	Yes	Lijo Jose Pellissery
2024	Thekku Vadakku	Yes	No	Yes	Prem Shankar

== See also ==
- List of Malayalam-language authors by category
- List of Malayalam-language authors
