= Elliot V. Kotek =

Australian producer

- Education: Monash University
- Occupations: Producer, filmmaker, lawyer, photographer, editor, writer
- Notable work: Moving Pictures

Elliot V. Kotek is an Australian producer, filmmaker, lawyer, photographer, editor, writer and the co-founder and former content chief of Not Impossible Now, and former executive director of the Not Impossible Foundation. He is also the founder and editor-in-chief of Beyond Cinema magazine.

== Career ==
A former mergers and acquisitions and biotech lawyer in Australia and New York, Kotek has a law degree and a BS in pharmacology and toxicology, both from Monash University. After moving to the U.S. in 2000, he studied at the Lee Strasberg Theatre Institute in New York and completed UCLA's Professional Program in Screenwriting. Kotek is the founder and editor-in-chief of Beyond Cinema magazine, the former editor-in-chief of both Moving Pictures and Celebs.com.

=== Film and documentary ===
Kotek produced Black Boys by Sonia Lowman, starring Malcolm Jenkins, Carmelo Anthony, Dr Harry Edwards and other luminaries - the film dealing with the lack of systematic investment in educational and emotional support for young Black males. He also produced Danica: Driven, a feature-length documentary about race-car driver Danica Patrick, and for which he received multiple best producer awards. Kotek executive produced Matt Kay's Little Miss Sumo, a film about Hiyori Kon, the first woman sumo wrestler to pursue a professional career in Japan's national sport - and which resulted in Hiyori Kon being named to the BBC's List of 100 Most Influential Women for 2019. Kotek executive produced Colin Keith Gray's 90291: Venice Unzipped, about the housing affordability and homelessness crisis in the city of Venice, California. Kotek co-produced the feature documentary 140, the first ever user-generated film made utilizing social-media. In 2015, Kotek produced the documentary Queen Mimi, about an 89-year-old homeless woman, her years of living in a laundromat and her friendship with The Hangover's Zach Galifianakis. Kotek wrote and directed short film Little Larry, which was a 2011 Directors Guild of Canada nominee for Best Short Film.

In 2019, Kotek worked with creative agency Sid Lee on the branding for the 2019 Sundance Film Festival with Kotek writing that year's "Risk Independence" tag line for the festival. He has served on the juries of the Palm Springs International Film Festival, Middle East International Film Festival, Bahamas International Film Festival, Sonoma International Film Festival, HATCHfest, BendFilm, Los Angeles Asian Pacific Film Festival as well as the Cinequest Screenwriting Competition and Newport Beach Film Festival's Volcom Award, and was on the U.S. Board of the Bahamas International Film Festival.

==== Black Boys ====
Kotek produced 2020's Black Boys (an NBC Peacock Original), a documentary that explored the dehumanization of Black males in America at the intersection of sports, education and criminal justice. The story was anchored by Greg Scruggs, a two-time Super Bowl champion and young father who recently returned to his hometown of Cincinnati to impress upon young Black athletes the importance of education. Supporting storylines follow Sharif El Mekki, a principal at a nearly all Black charter school in West Philadelphia, and young poet activists fighting for criminal justice reform in Chicago. Voices in the film include executive producer Malcolm Jenkins, NBA All-Star and three-time Olympic gold-medalist Carmelo Anthony, Jemele Hill, Dr. Harry Edwards, former Secretary of Education John King, NFL Hall of Famer Cris Carter, Arne Duncan, Howard Bryant, Chris Broussard, Alan Page and more. The film features an original track by Ben Harper.

==== Little Miss Sumo ====
Kotek executive produced the Netflix original Little Miss Sumo about female sumo wrestlers in Japan. Hiyori Kon is one of the best sumo wrestlers in the world at age 20. Though women don't reach their physical peak until the age of 25 or 26, she was to be forced into retirement next year due to Japan's conservative attitude toward the sport and women. In the film, Hiyori trains for the world championship. Hiyori was named to the BBC's 2019 list of the World's 100 Most Influential Women. The film also qualified for the 2020 Oscars.

==== Queen Mimi ====
Queen Mimi, a documentary which follows the journey of Marie Elizabeth Haist, an unhoused woman dubbed "Queen" Mimi of Montana Avenue. The film was produced by Kotek and filmed over five years by actor/director (and then-barista) Yaniv Rokah and illuminates Mimi's difficult past, secrets held, and a caring community that came together to construct a new chapter in a long life marked by massive change.

Stan Fox, owner of Fox Laundry, allowed Mimi to stay in the laundromat. She cleaned the facility and assisted patrons with laundry tasks. Mimi interacted with patrons including Yania Rokah, Renee Zellweger, and Zach Galifianakis.

The film played at film festivals and landed Mimi on the pages of the Los Angeles Times. The film was released in May 2016 by XLrator Media.

==== My Special Aflac Duck ====
Kotek directed and produced the "My Special Aflac Duck" campaign for Aflac's ongoing Aflac Childhood Cancer initiative. Developed in conjunction with Sproutel and Carol Cone On Purpose, My Special Aflac Duck is a smart robotic companion that features naturalistic movements and interactive technology to help comfort children coping with cancer treatment. Following more than a year of child-centered design and research with stakeholder groups, My Special Aflac Duck received three awards upon its launch at the Consumer Electronics Show (CES) and garnered 2.2 billion media impressions in the first four days post-launch. My Special Aflac Duck ahs since been distributed, free of charge, to children in 49 states and more than 150 cancer institutions and hospitals. The campaign won multiple Cannes Lions, SABRE, Stevie, Telly, Hermes, Purpose and Communicator awards.

==== Made Responsibly: New Balance ====
In 2019, Kotek directed, co-wrote and produced Made Responsibly, an initiative of the Global Compliance Team at New Balance. The film follows a day in the life of Jamie, a New Balance team member in Ho Chi Minh City, Vietnam. The film subtly exhibits New Balance's socially responsible touch-points (energy and the environment, responsible materials, work conditions, water and waste reclamation and treatment practices) and the importance that New Balance places on people and families. While other apparel brands might show the future of the factory being pristine but devoid of humanity, New Balance - still an independent, family-owned company, wanted to keep the focal point on the hands that make their footwear and apparel, and support those people with products and practices that honor their contribution. The piece was nominated for an Emmy by the New England chapter of the Television Academy, and received dozens of top corporate social responsibility, branded content, and online media awards. The director of photography on the piece was by Eve M. Cohen, drone photography by Hugo Leenhardt, editing by Fred Beahm, music composed by Jordan Halpern Schwartz and was voice by Celia Almanzan-Fox from a script by Elliot V. Kotek and John Stokes. "Made Responsibly" is a Nation of Artists production commissioned by Cone Communications for New Balance.

==== Project Daniel ====
In 2013, Kotek and founder of Not Impossible Mick Ebeling launched Project Daniel, which established the first 3D printing prosthetic lab in the Nuba Mountains and successfully built a prosthetic arm for Daniel, a Sudanese boy who lost his limb during wartime. "Project Daniel" debuted at CES 2014 in Las Vegas alongside Intel. Of the project, Time's tech journalist Harry McCracken wrote, "it's hard to imagine any other device here doing more to make the world a better place."

Project Daniel has been featured in Time, Wired, Business Insider, the BBC, The Guardian, TV Globo, The Independent and CNET.

Other Not Impossible projects Kotek has produced include Don's Voice, The Brainwriter and The Robot Walker.

==== First 360 ====
With 660,000 students competing, FIRST is the world's foremost STEM competition. Elliot and a Nation of Artists team that included Matt Celia, Sebastien Hameline, Cody Peterson, Chris Willett, Josh Helfferich, Robert Watts and local camera people and photographers traveled to the 2019 and 2020 FIRST Championships in Colorado and Minnesota, and to the world champion Vitruvian Bots team at the Da Vinci School in El Segundo. The piece has generated awards including Tellys, Hermes Creative awards and Communicator Awards.

==== Qualcomm Wireless Reach: The Power of 9 ====
Kotek directed and produced the award-winning "Power of 9: Mobile Innovation for Good". Highlighting the Sustainable Development Goals (SDGs) adopted by world leaders at the United Nations in 2015, the initiative focuses on Goal 9 (Build resilient infrastructure, promote sustainable industrialization and foster innovation), and demonstrates innovative ways mobile technology is being leveraged for social and economic development in underserved communities.

Made up of three short films, one longer documentary, three virtual reality pieces and other assets, the campaign reflected and advanced Qualcomm's corporate social responsibility initiative "Qualcomm for Good" which posits that advanced wireless technology can improve people's lives and directly invests in programs that utilize advanced wireless technologies to positively impact education, entrepreneurship, health care, the environment and public safety. The campaign was presented at the United Nations Foundation in 2018.

==== Don's Voice ====
As co-founder and content chief of Not Impossible, Elliot and his team utilize crowd-sourcing to crowd-solve healthcare issues by providing low-cost and DIY tech to people in need all over the world. Don's Voice is the true story of Don and Lorraine Moir, a farm family debilitated by ALS.

The Not Impossible team, led by volunteer engineer Javed Gangjee, utilized its know-how, HP hardware, and SpeakYourMind Foundation software to develop a simple interface that replicated the paper letter board Don had been using to communicate (via blinking) for years. The software used eye tracking technology and allowed Don to communicate without a 3rd party. Through this simple technology, Don wrote a love letter to his wife and was able to independently generate "I love you, Lorraine" for the first time in 15 years. The mini-documentary was released in time for Valentine's Day and was the recipient of multiple industry awards, and generated 100 million media impressions within two weeks of release. More importantly, the software was made available for download, for free.

=== Art ===
A published poet and exhibited photographer, Kotek has had solo exhibitions at the Helen Gory Gallery in Melbourne, and group shows at the Copro Gallery at Bergamot Station and the Hibbleton Gallery in Fullerton alongside work by Ed Ruscha, Shepard Fairey, Don Bachardy and other LA-resident luminaries at the Venice Art Walk. Elliot's Polaroid photography is also reproduced in the book Still Developing: A Story of Instant Gratification, published by ISM and edited by Kevin Staniec.

=== Non-profit ===
After serving as the executive director of the Not Impossible Foundation, Elliot joined the Board of Directors of The Giving Back Fund, for which he remains on the Board of Advisors. During the COVID-19 outbreak, Kotek also launched VentLife.org, of which is he is the founding executive director. VentLife is a collaboration between numerous volunteers including members of UCLA's BioDesign program, former engineers from SpaceX and practitioners from Ronald Reagan Medical Center and elsewhere, to produce a low-cost, medical-grade ventilator - in mid-2020, the ventilator prototyped was already before the FDA for emergency use authorization approval.

== Awards and appearances ==
- Cannes Lions (2014) Titanium Lion for Project Daniel sponsored by Precipart and Intel
- Cannes Lions (2014) Gold Lion in the Product Design category for Project Daniel sponsored by Precipart and Intel
- Cannes Lions (2014) Bronze Lion in the Cyber category for Intel's "Look Inside™" campaign
- Cannes Lions (2014) Bronze Lion in the Film category for Intel's "Look Inside™" campaign
- Cannes Lions (2014) Bronze Lion in the Branded Content & Entertainment category for Project Daniel, sponsored by Intel and Precipart
- One Show (2015) Design Merit Award for Don's Voice
- The One Show (2015) Interactive Silver Pencil for Don's Voice
- The One Show (2015) Branded Entertainment Bronze Pencil for Don's Voice
- The One Show (2014) Design Gold Pencil for Project Daniel
- The One Show (2014) Intellectual Property Gold Pencil
- Clio Award (2014) Branded Entertainment for Project Daniel
- Telly Award (2014) Silver Award for Social Responsibility for Project Daniel
- Telly Award (2014) Bronze Award for Documentary for Project Daniel
- AICP Award (2014) Next Cause Marketing Award for Project Daniel
- SXSW Interactive (2015) Innovation Award for Project Daniel
- Nominet Trust 100 (2014) for Project Daniel
- NYU/Tisch Craft Award (2004)
- WPA Maggie Award (2007) Moving Pictures
- WPA Maggie Award (2009) Moving Pictures
- TEDMED The Hive (2014) Innovative Startup: Not Impossible
- Manhattan Film Festival (2015), "Best Documentary" for Queen Mimi
- St. Tropez International Film Festival, "Best Director" for Queen Mimi

=== Appearances ===
- Nexus Global Youth Summit (2015) at the United Nations, featured speaker
- Doha GOALS Forum (2015) Los Angeles, speaker
- Sports and Entertainment Philanthropy Summit (2015) Los Angeles, featured speaker
- NxNE Interactive Toronto (2014), opening speaker
- SIGGRAPH (2014) Vancouver, opening speaker
- SXSW Interactive (2015) Austin, keynote speaker
- Maker Faire (2015) San Francisco, featured speaker
- Social Innovation Summit (2015) Washington, D.C., featured speaker
- SXSW V2V (2015) Las Vegas, featured speaker
- Techweek LA (2014) Los Angeles, featured speaker
- The UP Experience / UP Abilities (2015) Houston, featured speaker
- Monash University Global Challenges (2014) Melbourne AUS, commencement day speaker
- Dell Entrepreneur Network Summit (2015) Berlin, GER, featured speaker
- UCLA Anderson School of Business Social Innovation Week (2015) Los Angeles, featured speaker
