= Graham McTavish =

Scottish actor (born 1961)

- McTavish in 2025
- Born: Graham McTavish; 4 January 1961 (age 65); Glasgow, Scotland
- Education: Queen Mary University of London (BA)
- Occupations: Actor; author
- Years active: 1986–present
- Spouses: Gwen Isaac (divorced) Garance Doré (m. 2023)
- Children: 2

Graham McTavish (born 4 January 1961) is a Scottish actor and author. He is known for his roles as Dwalin in The Hobbit film trilogy, The Saint of Killers in the AMC series Preacher, Dougal MacKenzie and William Buccleigh MacKenzie in the Starz series Outlander, and Harrold Westerling in the HBO series House of the Dragon. He is also known for his roles in the video game franchise Uncharted as the main antagonist Zoran Lazarević in Uncharted 2: Among Thieves and Charlie Cutter in Uncharted 3: Drake's Deception, as well as having voiced Dracula in the Netflix animated series adaptation of Castlevania (2017–18; 2021) and in the game Castlevania: Belmont's Curse (2026).

Graham is proud of his Scottish heritage and a member of Clan MacTavish. In 2020, McTavish and Outlander co-star Sam Heughan co-wrote Clanlands: Whisky, Warfare, and a Scottish Adventure Like No Other, which hit No. 1 on the New York Times' Best Seller Lists for hardcover nonfiction and for combined print and e-book nonfiction.

== Early life ==
Graham McTavish was born 4 January 1961 in Glasgow, Scotland. He is the son of Alec and Ellen McTavish. The family, especially his father, was politically active, and political discourse was common in their household. His family left Glasgow when McTavish was a child, and throughout his adult life, he has lived in places such as Canada, the United States, and England before settling in New Zealand. During school, McTavish and a friend would write and perform comedy sketches, which led to his drama teacher asking him to step in to cover a role in Sheridan's The Rivals after the principal actor became ill. He went on to attend Queen Mary University of London, earning a degree in English literature. This degree course allowed him to perform in three Shakespeare plays per year while at school, and led to McTavish earning his Equity card after performing in a play by Samuel Beckett.

== Career ==
Early in his career, McTavish did theatre work with the repertory theatres of London's West End and at the Dundee Rep with colleagues that included Jimmy Logan and Robert Robertson.

=== Television ===
McTavish's first professional role, in 1986, was in episode two of Walt Disney's mini-series Return to Treasure Island. He next featured in 1988's Freedom Fighter (aka Wall of Tyranny), which was broadcast on ITV and starred Tony Danza as a man who helped those living in East Berlin cross the Berlin Wall. Popular fantasy-adventure series Highlander, which centered on an immortal man tasked with fighting evil, saw McTavish in the series four episode "Judgment Day" in 1996 and the television film Merlin saw him co-star as Rengal in 1998. Between 1998 and 1999, he went on to appear in several episodic television series including a three-part episode of ITV's Glasgow based crime drama Taggart, BBC One medical drama Casualty, BBC Two's sci-fi sitcom Red Dwarf, and ITV's police drama Heartbeat.

In 2000, McTavish guest-starred in ITV's mini-series The Stretch, a two-part crime drama centering on crime boss Terry Green and his wife Sam. The next year guest-starred on a series two episode of BBC One's long-running medical drama Doctors. In 2002, he had guest spots on BBC One's comedy Celeb, ITV's crime drama Rose & Maloney, and ABC's fantasy mini-series Dinotopia. The following year he featured in an episode of ITV's mystery drama Rosemary & Thyme, three episodes of ITV's gangster drama Family, and two episodes of BBC's mini-series The Last King (aka Charles II: The Power and the Passion). BBC's crime drama Murphy's Law (2004), a serial revolving around an undercover police officer in London, saw McTavish guest-star in the series two episode "Bent Moon on the Rise", followed by a turn as Captain James Stagg in BBC's made for TV Film D-Day 6 June 1944.

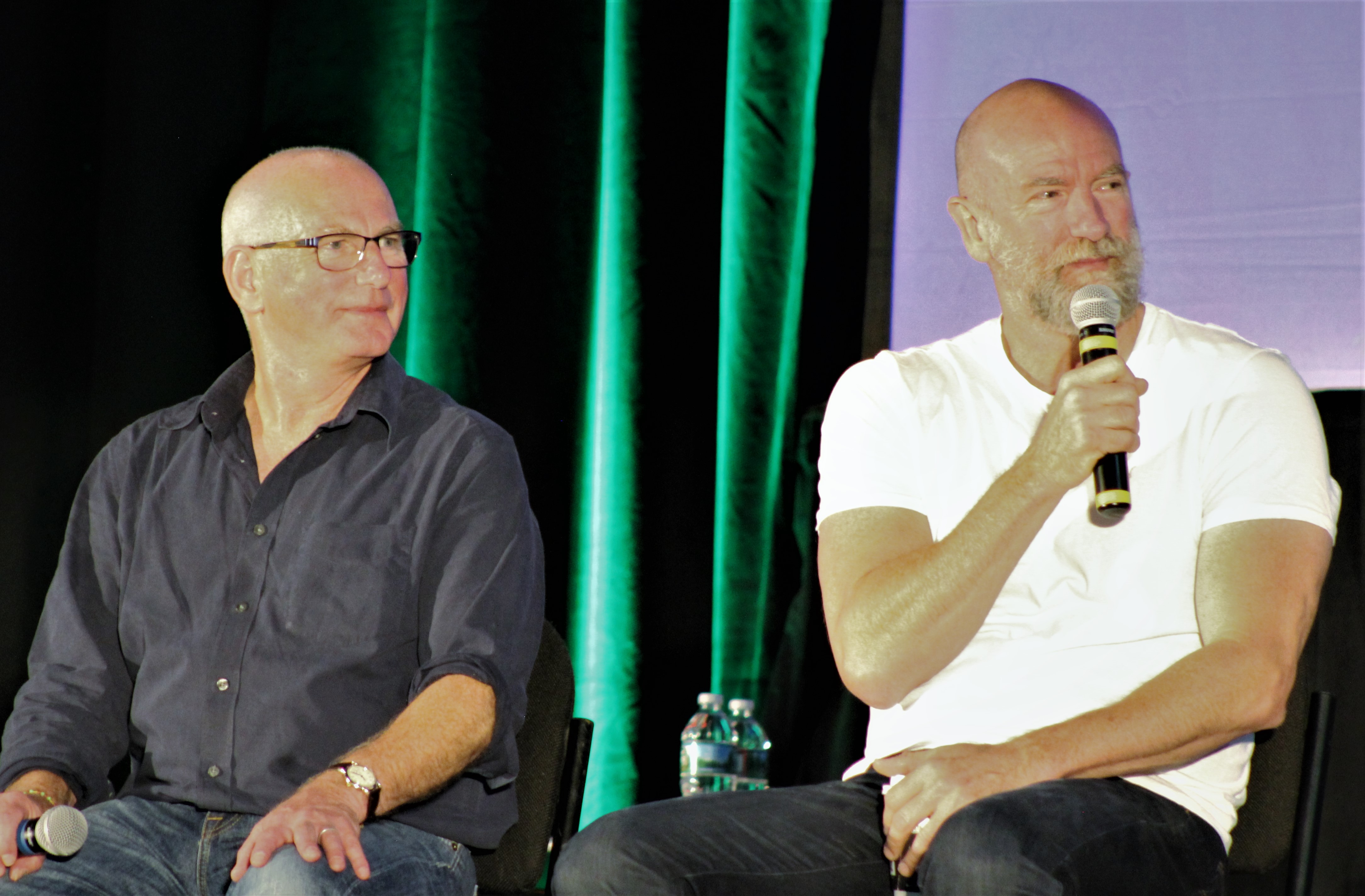
Graham McTavish (R) and Gary Lewis (L) respond to questions during their panel at an Outlander convention in 2018.

McTavish returned to the crime drama Taggart in 2005's episode "Mind Over Matter" and to medical drama Casualty in the series nineteen episode "Baby Love". That same year, he was cast in two separate series based upon events from the rise of the Roman Empire. First was a five episode role as General Rapax in ABC's mini-series Empire, which chronicled Octavius, who would become Emperor Augustus. Second was a two-episode stint as Urbo in HBO's Golden Globe nominated series Rome. He went on to a recurring role in ITV's police procedural drama The Bill. McTavish finished out the year by starring in two television films: Good Girl, Bad Girl, the story of a set of twins who tangle with a drug dealer, and Sharpe's Challenge, a drama surrounding a British Soldier (Sean Bean) during the Napoleonic Wars.

2007 saw McTavish feature in numerous episodic television productions. He portrayed The Dark Spirit in a three episode guest appearance on CBS's web series Ghost Whisperer: The Other Side, which explored the world through the ghost's perspective. The series is a spin-off of their supernatural series Ghost Whisperer. From there he had guest appearances in BBC One's dramas Jekyll and New Tricks, ITV's medical drama The Royal, CBS's FBI centered drama Numb3rs, police procedural NCIS, and family drama Cane. The next year he landed the role of Ferguson in the fourth season of Fox's popular drama Prison Break. In the fourth season of ABC's hit science fiction series Lost, McTavish guest starred as Desmond's drill sergeant. He also appeared in ABC's supernatural thriller Pushing Daisies and CBS's crime drama CSI: Miami. In 2009, McTavish returned to CBS for a guest starring role, opposite Jennifer Love Hewitt, in the supernatural drama Ghost Whisperer.

McTavish portrayed Russian foreign minister Mikhail Novakovich in a seven-episode stint on Fox's hit series 24 in 2010. He went on to appear in an episode of Fox's action comedy series The Good Guys, which revolves around two detectives stuck solving small crimes. In September 2013, it was announced that he had been cast as Dougal MacKenzie, war chief of the MacKenzie clan, in Starz's time-travel drama series Outlander. The series is an adaption of the bestselling novels by author Diana Gabaldon and premiered on 9 August 2014 to positive reviews from both critics and television audiences. McTavish would reprise the role throughout seasons one and two. In 2016, McTavish landed the recurring role of William Munny, the Saint of Killers in AMC's drama Preacher, which is based upon Garth Ennis and Steve Dillon's comic book series of the same name. 2018 saw McTavish feature in the recurring role of Andrew MacGregor in USA Network's science fiction series Colony, which explores earth after an alien attack. Season four of the Netflix drama Lucifer, with McTavish in the recurring role of Father Kinley, debuted in 2019. The series was based upon Neil Gaiman's Lucifer character from The Sandman comics.

McTavish returned to Outlander in 2020, in a surprise appearance as William Buccleigh MacKenzie, the son of Dougal MacKenzie and Geillis Duncan (Lotte Verbeek). Later that year, he and Outlander co-star Sam Heughan announced that STARZ had ordered eight episodes of the travel documentary Men in Kilts: A Roadtrip with Sam and Graham, and it premiered in February 2021. The show's second season premiered in August 2023, exploring McTavish's adopted home of New Zealand.

In 2021 McTavish also joined the cast of Netflix's fantasy drama The Witcher, based upon author Andrzej Sapkowski's book series, as master spy and Redanian Intelligence head Sigismund Dijkstra.

=== Film ===
For Queen and Country (1988), a social drama from director Martin Stellman, featured McTavish opposite Denzel Washington in his first professional film role. The next year he had a small part in Terry Jones' mythological comedy Erik the Viking, which was written and performed in the style of a Monty Python film. Working once again with Jones, McTavish portrayed a drunken weasel in 1996's Mr. Toad's Wild Ride, an adaptation of Kenneth Grahame's children's classic The Wind in the Willows. He went on to star in director Jeremy Freeston's 1997 adaptation of Shakespeare's Macbeth, opposite Jason Connery. McTavish performed in two documentaries on Shakespearean works in 1997. The first was Cromwell Productions' King Lear: A Critical Guide, where he portrayed Albany. Second was Julius Caesar: A Critical Guide, where he portrayed Brutus. He continued with Shakespeare in 1999 by portraying the Duke of Albany in King Lear, opposite Brian Blessed.

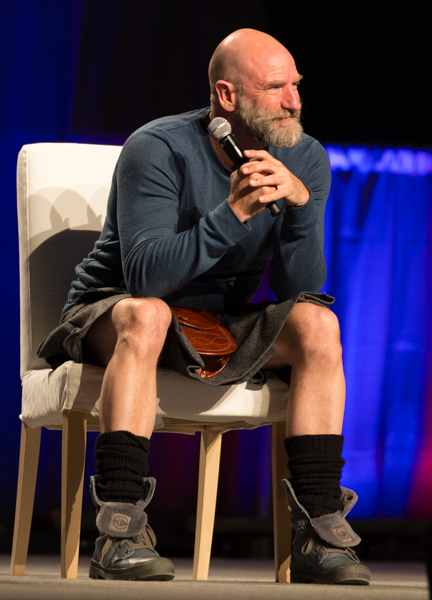
McTavish listens to an audience question during his panel at the Calgary Expo 2015.

McTavish's next feature film was 2002's Ali G Indahouse, where he portrayed a customs officer, followed by 2003's Dot the i, where he portrayed a detective opposite Tom Hardy. He went on to portray a submarine captain in director Jan de Bont's Lara Croft Tomb Raider: The Cradle of Life. The next year he was featured in Buena Vista Pictures' action adventure film King Arthur. In 2008, McTavish starred opposite Sylvester Stallone in Rambo, the fourth film in the franchise based upon David Morrell's 1972 novel First Blood. His next film, director Richard Wellings-Thomas' comedy Sisterhood, saw McTavish in the role of Martin. 2009 saw several film roles for McTavish, including prison drama Green Street 2, independent horror film Penance, Jason Connery's thriller Pandemic, and the dramatic comedy Middle Men, opposite Luke Wilson.

In 2010, McTavish had a supporting role in Disney's Secretariat, based upon the true story of Penny Chenery and the racehorse who would win the first American Triple Crown in twenty-five years. He would go on to feature in The Wicker Tree (2011), Robin Hardy's sequel to his 1973 film The Wicker Man, and Sony Pictures' action film Colombiana, opposite Zoe Saldaña. Between 2012 and 2014, he portrayed the dwarf Dwalin in director Peter Jackson's Empire Award-winning The Hobbit trilogy. McTavish completed 2014 with a supporting role in the action adventure film Plastic, opposite Ed Speleers, and director Jonathan King's independent sci-fi thriller REALITi. The next year he portrayed Ricky Conlan (Tony Bellew)'s boxing trainer Tommy Holiday in Creed, the seventh film in the Rocky franchise.

Disney's The Finest Hours, based upon the true story of a daring Coast Guard rescue in 1952, saw McTavish co-star opposite Chris Pine and Eric Bana in 2016. He then appeared, as himself, in director Yaniv Rokah's documentary Queen Mimi, which recounted the life of a homeless woman in Santa Monica, California. In 2017, McTavish starred in director Niall Johnson's western thriller The Stolen, followed by a cameo as King Atlan in the DC Comics/Warner Brothers film Aquaman. Director Adam Sigal's independent film Sargasso saw McTavish in a starring role in early 2019. Later that same year, it was announced that McTavish would star, opposite Anne Heche, in Specter Pictures' upcoming horror thriller Chasing Nightmares.

McTavish is currently working on his directoral debut, titled This Guest of Summer, which was partially funded through IndieGoGo, a crowd funding platform. Besides directing, he will also star in the film alongside fellow Outlander alumni Stephen Walters and Duncan Lacroix and fellow Hobbit alumni Dean O'Gorman and Adam Brown.

=== Voice work ===
McTavish has done extensive voice work in animated series, films and video games.

==== Animation and films ====
McTavish's first voice work was in the recurring role of Sebastian Shaw in the Marvel Comics series Wolverine and the X-Men. McTavish continued in the Marvel Universe by portraying the villain Loki in the direct-to-video animated feature Hulk Versus and the Disney XD animated series The Avengers: Earth's Mightiest Heroes. In 2010, he portrayed the lead role of Dante in Dante's Inferno: An Animated Epic, opposite Mark Hamill. The direct-to-video feature was a companion piece to Electronic Arts' video game Dante's Inferno, which was based upon Dante Alighieri's fourteenth century epic poem Divine Comedy.

2011 saw McTavish feature in director Mike Disa's direct-to-video sci-fi animated feature Dead Space: Aftermath in the role of Captain Caleb Campbell. From there, between 2015 and 2017, he had a recurring voice role in Nickelodeon's animated series Teenage Mutant Ninja Turtles and a guest spot in an episode of Kung Fu Panda: Legends of Awesomeness (2016). McTavish would go on to feature in Cartoon Network's animated series Transformers: Robots in Disguise, in the dual roles of Titus and Vernon, while he appeared as the voice of Fergus McDuck, father of Scrooge McDuck, in the 2017 DuckTales animated series episode "The Secret(s) of Castle McDuck!" McTavish starred as Dracula in Netflix's animated series Castlevania, an adaptation of Konami's Gothic horror video game series.

==== Video games ====
Guerrilla Games' action game Killzone: Liberation (2006), a sequel to its popular game Killzone, was McTavish's first professional voice role in video games. He would go on, in 2009, to portray Commander Lucius in Epic Games' Shadow Complex, Crimson in Tecmo Koei's Ninja Gaiden Sigma 2, Arl Eamon Guerrin in BioWare's Dragon Age: Origins, Archer in Activision's Call of Duty: Modern Warfare 2, and Wilcox in Electronic Arts' The Saboteur. McTavish also provided both the voice and motion capture work for the main antagonist Zoran Lazarević in action-adventure game Uncharted 2: Among Thieves. The next year he provided the voice of the main protagonist Dante Alighieri in Dante's Inferno, Khan in Metro 2033, the Decepticon Thundercracker in Transformers: War for Cybertron, and Viktor Barisov in Activision's Singularity.

In 2011, McTavish provided the voices of antagonist Joseph Bertrand III in Infamous 2, an imperial guardsman in Warhammer 40,000: Dawn of War II – Retribution, a ClawHammer soldier in SOCOM 4: U.S. Navy SEALs, Caddoc in Hunted: The Demon's Forge, and Ivan Stagleishov in Ace Combat: Assault Horizon. McTavish also provided both the voice and motion capture work for Charlie Cutter in Uncharted 3: Drake's Deception. He would reprise the role in 2016's Uncharted 4: A Thief's End after voicing Sebastian Malory/Sir Percival in 2015's third-person action-adventure game The Order: 1886.

In 2026, McTavish will provide the voice of Dracula in the game Castlevania: Belmont's Curse (2026), returning to the character after previously voicing a separate incarnation in the Netflix animated series adaptation.

McTavish has also provided additional voices for Medieval II: Total War, Heavenly Sword, 007: Quantum of Solace, Call of Duty: Modern Warfare: Mobilized, Call of Duty: Black Ops, and Star Wars: The Old Republic.

=== Writing ===
In 2020, McTavish and fellow Outlander actor Sam Heughan published a book entitled Clanlands: Whisky, Warfare, and a Scottish Adventure Like No Other, which was inspired by their work on the upcoming STARZ docu-series Men in Kilts. The book reached the #1 spot on the New York Times' Best Seller Lists for hardcover nonfiction and for combined print and e-book nonfiction, and also hit No. 1 on the Publishers Weekly Bestseller List for hardcover nonfiction, among other lists.

In April 2015, McTavish was the 17th grand marshall of New York City's Tartan Day Parade.

== Personal life ==
McTavish was married to New Zealand filmmaker Gwen Isaac, with whom he has two children. They lived in Central Otago, New Zealand.

In January 2023, McTavish married Garance Doré at Borthwick Castle in Scotland.

== Filmography ==
=== Film ===
Year	Title	Role	Notes	Source
1988	For Queen and Country	Lieutenant		
1989	Erik the Viking	Thangbrand		
1996	The Wind in the Willows	Drunken Weasel (voice)		
1997	King Lear: A Critical Guide	Albany	Short documentary film	
1997	Julius Caesar: A Critical Guide	Brutus / Himself	Short documentary film	
1999	King Lear	Duke of Albany		
2002	Ali G Indahouse	Customs Officer		
2003	Dot the i	Detective		
2003	Lara Croft Tomb Raider: The Cradle of Life	Submarine Captain		
2004	King Arthur	Roman Officer		
2008	Rambo	Lewis		
2008	Sisterhood	Martin		
2009	Hulk Vs.	Loki (voice)	Direct-to-video	
2009	Green Street 2: Stand Your Ground	Big Marc Turner	Direct-to-video	
2009	Middle Men	Ivan Sokoloff		
2009	Penance	Geeves		
2009	Pandemic	Captain Riley		
2010	Dante's Inferno: An Animated Epic	Dante (voice)	Direct-to-video	
2010	Secretariat	Earl Jansen		
2011	Dead Space: Aftermath	Captain Caleb Campbell (voice)	Direct-to-video	
2011	Colombiana	Head Marshall Warren		
2011	The Wicker Tree	Sir Lachlan Morrison		
2012	The Hobbit: An Unexpected Journey	Dwalin		
2013	The Hobbit: The Desolation of Smaug	Dwalin		
2014	Plastic	Steve Dawson		
2014	Realiti	Mandrake		
2014	The Hobbit: The Battle of the Five Armies	Dwalin		
2015	Creed	Tommy Holiday		
2016	The Finest Hours	Frank Fauteux		
2017	The Stolen	Bully		
2018	Aquaman	King Atlan		
2021	Blood Red Sky	Col. Alan Drummond		
2021	The Witcher: Nightmare of the Wolf	Deglan (voice)		
2021	Chasing Nightmares	Bill	Post-production	
2023	Somewhere in Montana	John Alexander		

=== Television ===
Year	Title	Role	Notes	Source
1986	Return to Treasure Island	Ned	Episode: "Mutiny"	
1988	Freedom Fighter	Guard	Television film	
1996	Highlander: The Series	Charlie	Episode: "Judgement Day"	
1998	Merlin: The Quest Begins	Rengal	Television film	
1998–2005	Taggart	Colonel Ian Sinclair, Robin Caldwell	4 episodes	
1998–2005	Casualty	Gerry Talbot, George Naseby	6 episodes	
1999	Red Dwarf	Senior Warden Ackerman	5 episodes	
1999	Heartbeat	Derek Flowers	Episode: "Tricks of the Trade"	
1999	The Knock	Alan Fraser	1 episode	
2000	The Stretch	Andy McKinley	Miniseries	
2001	Doctors	Paul Brookes	Episode: "Change of Heart"	
2002	Celeb	Steve	Episode: "The Party"	
2002	Rose and Maloney	Jackson	2 episodes	
2002	Dinotopia	Ajax	Episode: "Handful of Dust"	
2003	Rosemary & Thyme	D.I. Taylor	Episode: "The Language of Flowers"	
2003	Family	Tony Bishop	3 episodes	
2003	Charles II: The Power and the Passion	Captain	2 episodes	
2004	Murder City	Noel Fredericks	Episode: "Mr. Right"	
2004	Murphy's Law	Al Leyton	Episode: "Bent Moon on the Rise"	
2004	D-Day 6 June 1944	Group Captain James Stagg	Television film	
2005	Empire	General Rapax	5 episodes	
2005	Rome	Urbo	2 episodes	
2005–06	The Bill	Peter Larson	6 episodes	
2006	Good Girl, Bad Girl	Gromek	Television film	
2006	Sharpe's Challenge	McRae	Television film	
2007	New Tricks	Jason Ferris	Episode: "Powerhouse"	
2007	Jekyll	Gavin Hardcastle	Episode: "Hyde"	
2007	Ghost Whisperer: The Other Side	The Dark Spirit	3 episodes	
2007	Numb3rs	John Corcoran	Episode: "Thirteen"	
2007	NCIS	Aleksei	Episode: "Chimera"	
2007	The Royal	Anthony Poole	Episode: "Love & Ross"	
2007	Cane	Neville	Episode: "HurriCane"	
2008	Lost	Sergeant	Episode "The Constant"	
2008	CSI: Miami	Mitch Davis	Episode: "All In"	
2008	Pushing Daisies	Hansel Von Getz	Episode: "Bad Habits"	
2008	Prison Break	Ferguson	4 episodes	
2009	Wolverine and the X-Men	Sebastian Shaw (voice)	4 episodes	
2009	Ghost Whisperer	Gordon Brady	Episode: "The Book of Changes"	
2010	24	Mikhail Novakovich	5 episodes	
2010	The Good Guys	Dolph	Episode: "Hunches & Heists"	
2010–11	The Avengers: Earth's Mightiest Heroes	Loki (voice)	4 episodes	
2013	The Sixth Gun	Silas Hedgepet	Pilot	
2014–16, 2020, 2024	Outlander	Dougal MacKenzie/William (Buck) MacKenzie	20 episodes (seasons 1–2, 5, 7)	
2015–17	Teenage Mutant Ninja Turtles	Savanti Romero (voice)	5 episodes	
2016	Kung Fu Panda: Legends of Awesomeness	Kim (voice)	Episode: "Camp Ping"	
2016–19	Preacher	William Munny, the Saint of Killers	42 episodes	
2017–21	Castlevania	Vlad Dracula Țepeș (voice)	22 episodes	
2017	Transformers: Robots in Disguise	Titus, Vernon (voice)	Episode: "The Golden Knight"	
2018	Colony	Andrew MacGregor	3 episodes	
2018–20	DuckTales	Fergus McDuck, Murdoch McDuck (voice)	2 episodes	
2019	Lucifer	Father Kinley, Dromos	6 episodes	
2021–23	Men in Kilts: A Roadtrip with Sam and Graham	Himself	Main role	
2021–25	The Witcher	Sigismund Dijkstra	12 episodes	
2022	House of the Dragon	Harrold Westerling	Main role; 9 episodes	
2025	Love, Death & Robots	Bishop Cleary	Episode: "Golgotha"	
2025	The Mighty Nein	King Bertrand Dwendal (voice)	2 episodes	
2025–26	Spartacus: House of Ashur	Korris	Main role	
2026	Devil May Cry	Arius von Enhrenberg (voice)	8 episodes	

=== Video games ===
Year	Title	Voice role	Notes	Source
2006	Killzone: Liberation	HGH Support, HGH Generic, HGH Infantry		
2006	Medieval II: Total War	Additional voices		
2006	Lost Planet: Extreme Condition	NEVEC Orbital Elevator Operator		
2007	Heavenly Sword	Additional voices		
2008	Lost Planet: Colonies	NEVEC Orbital Elevator Operator		
2008	007: Quantum of Solace	Additional voices		
2009	Shadow Complex	Commander Lucius		
2009	Ninja Gaiden Sigma 2	Crimson		
2009	Uncharted 2: Among Thieves	Zoran Lazarević	Also motion capture	
2009	Dragon Age: Origins	Arl Eamon Guerrin, Vartag Gavorn		
2009	Call of Duty: Modern Warfare 2	Archer		
2009	Call of Duty: Modern Warfare: Mobilized	Bell, additional voices		
2009	The Saboteur	Wilcox		
2010	Dante's Inferno	Dante Alighieri		
2010	Metro 2033	Khan		
2010	Transformers: War for Cybertron	Thundercracker		
2010	Singularity	Viktor Barisov		
2010	Call of Duty: Black Ops	Additional voices		
2011	Warhammer 40,000: Dawn of War II – Retribution	Imperial Guardsmen		
2011	SOCOM 4: U.S. Navy SEALs	ClawHammer Soldier, American Commander		
2011	Hunted: The Demon's Forge	Caddoc		
2011	Infamous 2	Joseph Bertrand III		
2011	Ace Combat: Assault Horizon	Ivan Stagleishov		
2011	Uncharted 3: Drake's Deception	Charlie Cutter, Zoran Lazarević	Also motion capture	
2011	Star Wars: The Old Republic	Additional voices		
2015	The Order: 1886	Sebastian Malory / Sir Percival		
2016	Uncharted 4: A Thief's End	Charlie Cutter, Zoran Lazarević	Multiplayer only	
2019	Guild Wars 2	Bangar Ruinbringer		
2022	Marvel's Midnight Suns	Johnny Blaze, Doctor Doom		
2024	Metro Awakening	Serdar Iskanderov	Protagonist	
2026	Castlevania: Belmont's Curse	Dracula		

== Written works by McTavish ==
- Clanlands: Whisky, Warfare, and a Scottish Adventure Like No Other (2020)

== Awards and nominations ==
Year	Award	Category	Nominated work	Result
2011	BTVA Voice Acting Awards	Best Vocal Ensemble in a Video Game	Uncharted 3: Drake's Deception	Nominated
2013	Online Film & Television Association	Best Original Song (Performer)	The Hobbit: An Unexpected Journey "Misty Mountains"	Nominated
2017	Satellite Awards	Best Ensemble (Television)	Outlander	Won
2017	BTVA Voice Acting Awards	Best Vocal Ensemble in a New Television Series	Castlevania	Nominated
2017	BTVA People's Choice Voice Acting Awards	Best Male Vocal Performance in a Television Series in a Guest Role	Castlevania (Dracula)	Won
