= Penance (disambiguation) =

Penance is an act of repentance.

Penance may also refer to:

- Penance (2009 film), American horror film
- Penance (2018 film), Irish historical drama film
- Penance (TV series), a 2012 Japanese miniseries
- Penance (British TV series), a 2020 British psychological melodrama
- Penance (comics), several comic characters:
  - Robbie Baldwin
  - Penance (X-Men)
- Penance (band), US doom metal band
- Penance, a superboss in Final Fantasy X
- "Penance" (Sanctuary), an episode of Sanctuary
- Penance Pass, a mountain pass in Victoria Land, Antarctica
- "Penance" (Arrow), an episode of Arrow
- Penance (novel), by Eliza Clark

== See also ==
- Arjuna's Penance, an Indian monolith
- Sacrament of Penance
