= Black Boys (film) =

American film

- Film poster
- Directed by: Sonia Lowman
- Produced by: Chad Williamson; Jon-Thomas Royston; Elliot V. Kotek; Sonia Lowman
- Cinematography: Jeanne Tyson
- Edited by: Evald Ridore
- Music by: John Hendicott; D'Anthoni Wooten
- Production companies: The Video Project; Never Whisper Justice Films
- Distributed by: Peacock
- Release date: September 10, 2020
- Running time: 95 minutes
- Country: United States
- Language: English

Black Boys is a 2020 American documentary film directed by Sonia Lowman.

== Premise ==
The documentary is split into four sections (Body, Mind, Voice, and Heart), exploring the generational toll that racism has on each. It addresses the dehumanization of young Black men by showing they are worthy of respect and care which have been denied to them systemically in the United States. Interviews are conducted with athletes including Carmelo Anthony and Greg Scruggs who discuss commodification of Black men in professional sports. It also documents how schools in districts with mostly Black students receive $1,800 per less per student in funding; and, how only two percent of educators are Black men, emphasizing that lack of role models.

== Cast ==
- Carmelo Anthony
- Cris Carter
- Harry Edwards
- Jemele Hill
- Malcolm Jenkins
- John King Jr.
- Chris Long
- Vic Mensa
- Greg Scruggs

== Music ==
The song "Black Beauty" was written and performed by Ben Harper and used as the theme song for the film.

== Reception and awards ==
The New York Times stated that director Sonia Lowman "takes a commendable poetic approach," and that the film has "moments of joy." The Suffolk Journal stated it was "a remarkable documentary that dove into exploring the trials of Black men in a country that isn't always willing to listen to or acknowledge them. The variety of stories were deeply-moving and added extra depth to the documentary by sharing the perspectives of both young and old Black men."

In 2020, Black Boys received the Public's Choice Award for best Feature Length Documentary at the Montreal International Black Film Festival as well as the Best Documentary Award at the Twin Cities Film Fest. In 2021, it won both the Best Overall Film award and the award for the Best People of Color Film at the Fort Smith International Film Festival, receiving a Hermes Creative Award the same year.
