= God's Country =

God's Country may refer to:

== Film ==
- God's Country (1946 film), a Western film directed by Robert Emmett Tansey
- God's Country (1985 film), a documentary film by French filmmaker Louis Malle
- God's Country (2011 film), family film directed by Chris Armstrong
- God's Country (2022 film), thriller film by Julian Higgins

== Music ==
=== Songs ===
- "God's Country", a song from the 1939 film adaptation of the musical Babes in Arms
- "God's Country" (Blake Shelton song), 2019
- "God's Country" (Travis Scott song), 2023
- "God's Country", a song by Ethel Cain featuring Wicca Phase Springs Eternal from Inbred (2021)

=== Albums ===
- God's Country, a working title for Donda, the 2021 album by Kanye West
- God's Country (album), the 2022 debut album by Chat Pile
- God's Country: George Jones and Friends, a 2006 tribute album

== Other uses ==
- God's Country (novel), a 1994 novel by Percival Everett
- God's Country (play), a 1988 play by Steven Dietz

== See also ==
- Back to God's Country (disambiguation)
- God's Country Radio Network, a 2008–2010 Christian music network
- God's Kingdom, a term used in Abrahamic religions
- God's Own Country (disambiguation)
- "In God's Country", a 1987 U2 song
- In God's Country (film), a 2007 Canadian TV drama film
