= Smuteye, Alabama =

Unincorporated community in Alabama, United States

- Unincorporated community
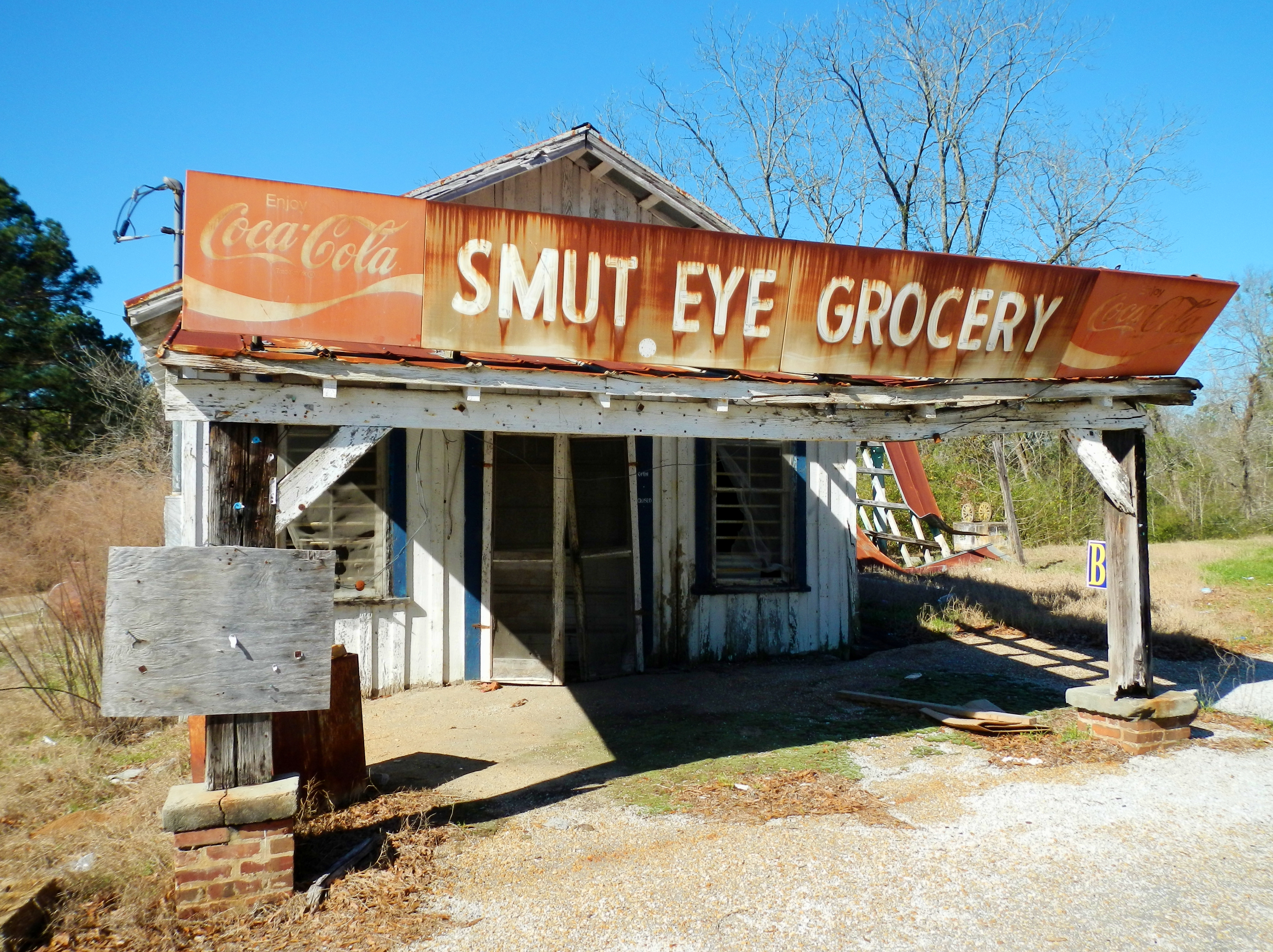
- Smut Eye Grocery

- Location within Alabama Location within the United States
- Coordinates: 31°58′41″N 85°39′01″W
- Country: United States
- State: Alabama
- County: Bullock
- Elevation: 466 ft (142 m)
- Time zone: UTC-6 (Central (CST))
  - Summer (DST): UTC-5 (CDT)
- ZIP code: 36005
- Area code: 334
- GNIS feature ID: 157081

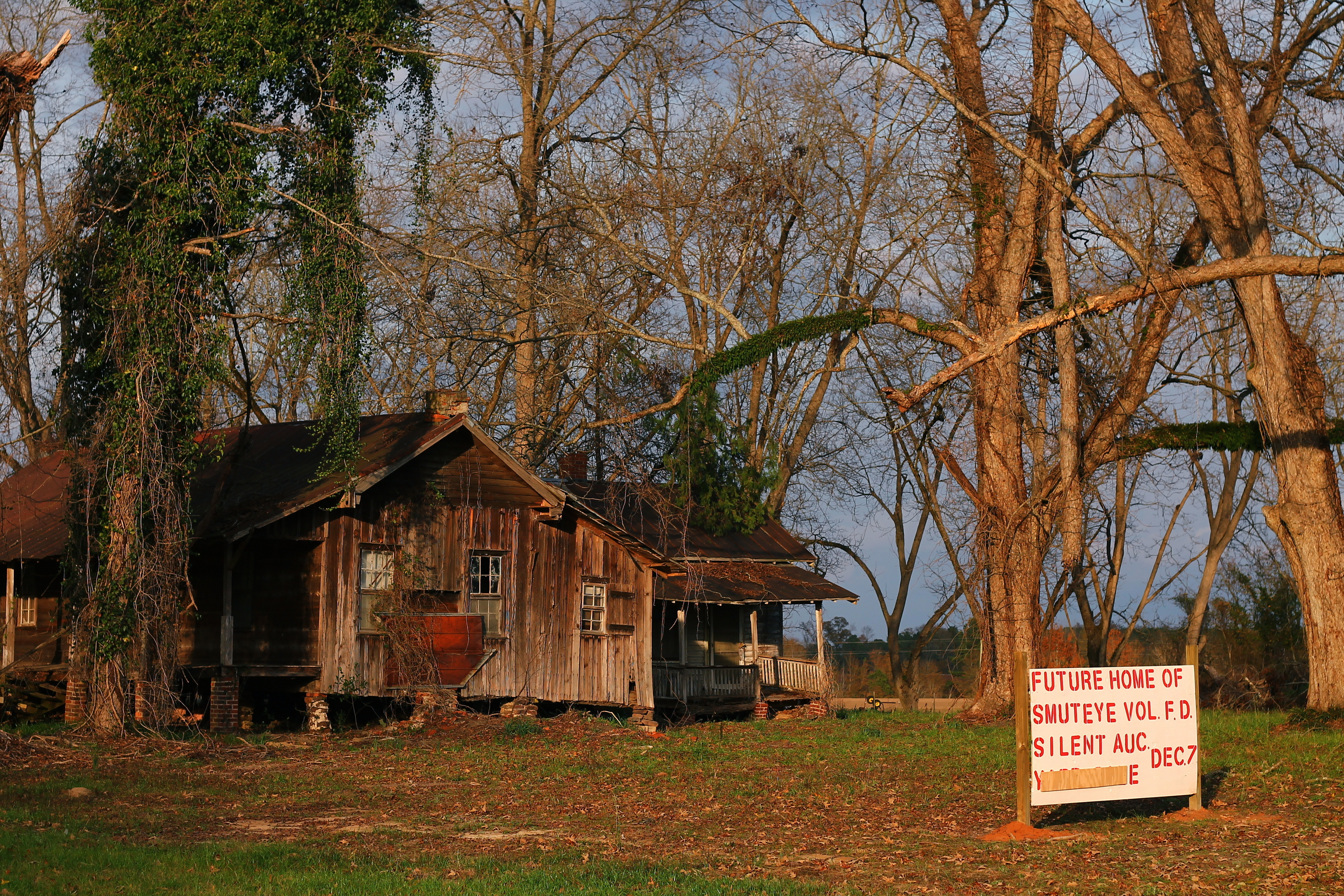
A sign depicting the potential future home of the community's volunteer fire department.

Smuteye or Smut Eye is an unincorporated community in Bullock County, Alabama, United States, located northeast of Perote.

Smuteye is located in ZIP code 36061, but residents now use a mailing address in Banks: 36005.

Smuteye Pond and Smuteye Lake are located north of Smuteye and south of Aberfoil.

== Name ==
According to one account, the community received its name when the local men would spend all day socializing at its blacksmith shop and return home covered in soot. It has frequently been noted on lists of unusual place names.

== Cultural references ==
The last three chapters of Percival Everett's novel, I Am Not Sidney Poitier are set in Smuteye.
