= I Am Not Sidney Poitier =

2009 novel by Percival Everett

- Author: Percival Everett
- Language: English
- Publisher: Graywolf Press
- Publication date: 2009
- Publication place: United States
- Media type: Print (hardback & paperback)
- Pages: 234
- Awards: Believer Book Award; Hurston/Wright Legacy Award
- Preceded by: The Water Cure
- Followed by: Assumption

I Am Not Sidney Poitier (2009) is a novel by American writer Percival Everett. Originally published by Graywolf Press, in 2020 it was published by Influx Press in the UK. It explores the tumultuous life of a character named Not Sidney Poitier as the social hierarchy scrambles to balance his skin color with his wealth.

Each adventure reflects a prominent film starring Sidney Poitier, such as The Defiant Ones (1958) or Guess Who's Coming to Dinner (1967), and incorporates a significant twist. The novel reflects a Post-black writing style by parodying the traditions of Black literature.

== Plot summary ==
=== Chapter 1 ===
The novel begins with the conception of Not Sidney Poitier, a boy whose mother, Portia, invests on the ground floor in Turner Broadcasting. She gains quite a lot of money when it becomes successful. Ted Turner comes to visit her and meets Not Sidney. Portia dies soon after the meeting, and Turner becomes Not Sidney's guardian.

Turner gives Not Sidney free rein over his money and life, to avoid the white savior stereotype. Not Sidney is educated by a socialist college student named Betty. Not Sidney is extensively bullied, and in response attempts to learn martial arts. When that fails, he learns how to "fesmerize" people, a skill akin to hypnosis. He uses that ability to mess with Turner, Betty, and Turner's wife, Jane Fonda. Upon reaching high school age, Not Sidney decides to attend public school. He develops a crush on his teacher, which she notices. She invites him to her home, where she sexually assaults him on two separate occasions. She threatens to fail him if he doesn't allow it, though after the second time, she fails him anyway. Not Sidney reports her actions, but is ridiculed by the administration both at his individual school and at the Board of Education. As a result, he drops out and decides to travel to California.

=== Chapter 2 ===
Not Sidney attempts to drive cross-country, but he is stopped and arrested by a racist cop. He is put into prison unlawfully. While being transported to another facility, he and his fellow prisoner escape when their bus crashes. He and Patrice head back to Atlanta on foot. After some time, they get into a fight and are interrupted by a young boy named Bobo. Bobo takes them to the house where he lives with his blind older sister. The four plan to jump atop the train headed back to Atlanta the next morning.

While they sleep, Not Sidney has the "Band of Angels" dream, in which he is a slave named Raz-ru. In the dream, he watches a high-yellow (mixed-race) woman be taken from her high-society life and be bought as a slave by his master, who Not Sidney eventually kills. The next day, Sis and Patrice begin a romantic relationship, and start drinking that night to celebrate. When the sun rises, Not Sidney opts to leave the couple sleeping and ride the train alone to Atlanta. (This chapter was inspired by Poitier's movies The Defiant Ones, A Patch of Blue, and Band of Angels).

=== Chapter 3 ===
Upon returning from his failed cross-country trip, Not Sidney decides to go to college, and sets up a meeting with Gladys Feet. He bribes her with a donation for a place in the upcoming class at Morehouse College, a historically black college. He's assigned to a room with Morris Chesney, a fraternity brother who attempts to bully and haze young men rushing the fraternity. To end their ongoing conflict, Not Sidney fesmerizes him into reorienting the fraternity around recycling and leaving him alone. While at Morehouse, he attends classes taught by professor and writer Percival Everett. Not Sidney goes to his office hours, and develops a mentor/mentee relationship with him after Everett reveals that he is a fraud. While attending Everett's classes, Not Sidney meets Maggie, a Spelman College student, and they begin a relationship.

=== Chapter 4 ===
Not Sidney goes home with Maggie for Thanksgiving. He learns that her family are Black conservatives, biased against Black people with darker skin. Not Sidney suffers a series of microaggressions from them and is hit on by Agnes, Maggie's sister. Agnes performs oral sex on him to upset Maggie. During their sexual encounter, Not Sidney has the "No Way Out" dream. He is a doctor who loses a white patient and is blamed for the man's death. Near the end of the visit, Maggie's parents find out that Not Sidney is immensely wealthy, and begin to treat him with a near-reverent respect. After recognizing this, he calls them out about their colorism and causes a scene at Thanksgiving dinner. He leaves the house and ends his relationship with Maggie. (This chapter was inspired by the movies Guess Who's Coming to Dinner and No Way Out.)

=== Chapter 5 ===
Not Sidney drops out of Morehouse and again tries to drive to California. His car begins to break down in the small Alabama town of Smuteye. He pulls into the driveway of a small house, seeking tools to fix the car. The nuns living there offer their tools, but ask him to fix their leaking roof in exchange. The sisters believe that he has been sent by God to help them build their church. They tell him he will be building a fence the following day.

He goes to sleep, and has the "Buck and the Preacher" dream. He is Buck, leader of a wagon train of freedmen in the West who are running from a posse of army men wanting them to work their land. He steals a horse from a preacher in order to escape. The preacher punches him in the face.

After he wakes, the sisters tell him again that he will build their church, but he is not convinced. He fixes his car and leaves. He stops at the Smuteye Diner to get some food. Hearing the waitress and patrons ridicule the sisters, he decides to use his wealth to help the nuns build the church. After a struggle to get a check cashed in Montgomery, Alabama, he witnesses a Klan rally. He watches a cross burn down before leaving. (This chapter was inspired by the movies Lilies of the Field and Buck and the Preacher.)

=== Chapter 6 ===
He returns to the nuns with the money, but finds they have hired a suspicious architect who clearly plans to abscond with the money. Because of his suspicions, Not Sidney only gives them a portion of the money, then goes to the diner only to be arrested for a murder he did not commit. He calls Ted Turner and Percival Everett for help, and they come down to rescue him. After being freed from prison, he finds that the person who was murdered looked exactly like him, and wonders if that was the real Sidney Poitier. A massive tornado starts to form as he returns to the nuns' house, and he sees Mr. Scrunchy and Sister Iranaeus shoveling his money into a bag. They drive away in a truck, and the police chief moves to apprehend them with Not Sidney, Ted Turner, and Percival Everett in the car, but when the group finds Mr. Scrunchy and Sister Iranaeus, they are both dead after their truck hits a pole. Not Sidney gets his money back, and decides to resume his trip to California by plane. This chapter was inspired by the movies They Call Me Mister Tibbs! (1970) and In the Heat of the Night (1967).

=== Chapter 7 ===
Not Sidney flies to Los Angeles, where he is met with press and a limousine, and is whisked away to an award show. He has truly become Sidney Poitier, and wins an award for a performance of his. In his acceptance speech, he references the fact that they are strangers to him, and dedicates the award to his mom, whose grave he has left unmarked. The words that end the book, his speech, and will stand on his mother's grave are: I Am Not Myself Today.

== Major characters ==
The following main characters are listed in order of appearance:

- Not Sidney Poitier, the protagonist
- Portia Poitier, Not Sidney's mother
- Ted Turner, head of Turner Broadcasting and Not Sidney's de facto guardian
- Betty, Not Sidney's socialist teacher and mentor
- Podgy Patel, Not Sidney's accountant
- Miss Hancock, Not Sidney's high school teacher who sexually assaults him
- Patrice, a racist convict who is chained to Not Sidney when the prison bus crashes
- Sis, a racist blind girl Not Sidney and Patrice run into
- Bobo, Sis' little brother
- Gladys Feet, an admissions officer from Morehouse who is attracted to Not Sidney
- Percival Everett, a fraudulent Morehouse professor who likes Sidney and enters into a mentoring relationship with him
- Maggie Larkin, Not Sidney's first girlfriend
- Agnes Larkin, Maggie's sister
- Ward and Ruby Larkin, Maggie's conservative parents
- Violet, their maid
- Sister Iranaeus, the head nun at the house where Not Sidney's car breaks down
- Thornton Scrunchy, a scam artist who conspires to steal the funds for the church
- The Chief, the racist chief of police of Smuteye who arrests Not Sidney and Everett

== Themes ==
=== Identity crisis ===
I Am Not Sidney Poitier explores the identity crisis associated with racial performances. In the novel, Not Sidney can never find his true self because Everett designed him to be a caricature of Sidney Poitier. He was constantly forced into a mold that eluded him. As Christian Schmidt states in his essay "The Parody of Postblackness...", Not Sidney is "a mere negation of self", because "without Sidney, Not Sidney would not exist."

Michael Buening, an editor from PopMatters, attaches this idea to the confusion that many Black men feel during situations in which they can not escape expectations associated with their skin and ethnicity. Buening concludes that Everett's parodied trope characterizes the experience of life for Black men as a journey of immense searching.

=== Post-blackness/Parody of Black literature ===
In the novel, Everett engages with several aspects of traditional Black literature through parody: "Playfully engaging the fiction of Ralph Ellison, Richard Wright, and intertextually invoking his own literary oeuvre, Everett's I Am Not Sidney Poitier signifies upon the history of African American literature and can fruitfully be read as a parody of it. Following Hutcheon, I use parody not in the narrow sense of 'ridiculing imitation' (A Theory 5) but as a term to describe complex forms of 'trans-contextualization' and inversion."

This approach is characteristic of many "Post-black" authors. These authors create worlds in which race may or may not be relevant, but does not totally control or define the story. By doing so, these authors change the view of "Black literature", and try to establish that Black authors are capable of creating stories that are not entirely about the concept of race.

== Critical reception ==
I Am Not Sidney Poitier received a warm reception but was limited in its reviews. It won the Believer Book Award. Everett's supporters lauded his absurdist comedic approach in creating a character that "negates" everything he is intended to represent.

Assistant professor Christian Schmidt from the University of Bayreuth defines the novel as a "meta parody that thematizes the very difference between original and copy even if the sign that marks this difference is as crude and banal as the simple 'not' of its protagonist's name." This attribute of the novel, along with its experimental and fractured lens of Not Sidney, create the "coded discourse" necessary for parody to thrive. Critics, including Schmidt, recognized Everett's emphasis on parody and noted instances such as his 2009 Fuck were discredited by many "intratextual critiques".

I Am Not Sidney Poitier has been classified as a part of "Post-black literature", by which Black novels parody/respond to the genre of Black literature. These authors write worlds that are entirely dependent on the text itself, and as such do not address the racism outside of it.

NPR called the story a "delicious comedy of miscommunications" and "one of the funniest, most original stories to be published in years."

Publishers Weekly's review lauded Everett as "a novelist at the height of his narrative and satirical powers" and the novel as "smart and without a trace of pretentiousness".

Kirkus Reviews said: "The author had some fun; the reader will too."
