= Penance (comics) =

Penance, in comics, may refer to:

- Robbie Baldwin, a Marvel Comics superhero also known as Speedball, formerly Penance
- Penance (X-Men), a body now known as Hollow, in which female members of the St Croix family have been imprisoned and taken on the name Penance:
  - Monet St. Croix, better known as M
  - Nicole and Claudette St. Croix, better known as the M-Twins
  - Hollow, the Penance body has a personality of its own even without a host and operates independently

== See also ==
- Penance (disambiguation)
