= Back to God's Country =

Back to God's Country may refer to:

- "Back to God's Country" (originally "Wapi the Walrus"), a short story by James Oliver Curwood, adapted for the following three films:
- Back to God's Country (1919 film), a Canadian silent film starring Nell Shipman
- Back to God's Country (1927 film), an American silent film starring Renée Adorée
- Back to God's Country (1953 film), an American film starring Rock Hudson

== See also ==
- God's Country (disambiguation)
