= Telephone (novel) =

2020 novel by Percival Everett

- Book cover
- Author: Percival Everett
- Language: English
- Genre: Literary fiction
- Publisher: Graywolf Press
- Publication date: May 5, 2020
- Publication place: United States
- Media type: Paperback
- Pages: 232
- ISBN: 9781644450222
- Preceded by: So Much Blue
- Followed by: The Trees

Telephone is a novel by American writer Percival Everett first published in 2020 by Graywolf Press. The novel is centered on Zach Wells, a professor living a self-professed "boring life" who is faced with his daughter being diagnosed with a terminal neurological disorder. While shopping online, he discovers anonymous notes pleading for help. The book was simultaneously released in three different versions, each with differences throughout the text and different endings.

== Setting and synopsis ==
The novel centers on Zach Wells, his wife Meg, and their adolescent daughter, Sarah. Zach is a professor of geology and paleobiology at the University of Southern California and Meg is a poet; Sarah is soon diagnosed with Batten disease, a terminal neurological disorder. Zach orders a shirt online and finds a note inside with the word "ayúdame", Spanish for "help me". After ordering additional items, Zach receives more notes and travels to New Mexico to distract himself from his daughter's deteriorating condition. He encounters white supremacists who are enslaving missing women from Ciudad Juárez.

The book was published as three distinct versions, each with slight differences throughout the text and different endings. Everett's intent was originally to keep the existence of the multiple versions a secret, but he decided to reveal it earlier due to the effects of the COVID-19 pandemic. Inspired by the childhood game of telephone, Everett intended to create a situation where "you may be talking about it with another reader and finding that you disagree on what happened". Each version of the book is distinguishable by a slight variation on the cover, where a compass points in a specific direction.

Everett cites the femicides in Ciudad Juárez as one of the seeds for the novel.

== Reception ==
The Los Angeles Times praised the novel, comparing the inadvertent choice between versions the reader makes with the choices Zach Wells himself must make in the course of the novel, saying: "Like watching a skilled juggler execute a six-ball fountain, the experience of reading Telephone is astonishing." Literary Hub enjoyed the book's "triplicate nature", but also called it an "engaging read" without knowing of the multiple versions. Kirkus Reviews was more critical, describing the novel as not believing in cause and effect.

=== Awards and honors ===
Telephone was nominated for a Pulitzer Prize for Fiction. It won the Hurston/Wright Legacy Award for fiction in 2021.
