= Somewhere in Montana =

- Poster
- Directed by: Brandon Smith
- Written by: Brandon Smith
- Starring: Graham McTavish
- Release date: June 22, 2023 (Polson)
- Country: United States
- Language: English

Somewhere in Montana is a 2023 American drama film written and directed by Brandon Smith and starring Graham McTavish.

== Cast ==
- Graham McTavish as John Alexander
- Matt Drago as Fabian Verdugo
- Kaleigh Macchio as Laney Alexander
- Michelle Hurd as Kat
- Andrew Roa as Bob

== Production ==
In February 2022, it was announced that McTavish was cast in the film.

== Release ==
The film premiered in Polson, Montana on June 22, 2023. Then it was released in theaters on January 10, 2025. It was originally scheduled to be released on October 18, 2024.

== Reception ==
Alan Ng of Film Threat rated the film a 7.5 out of 10.
