= Jeffrey Boakye =

British author, teacher, journalist and broadcaster (born 1982)

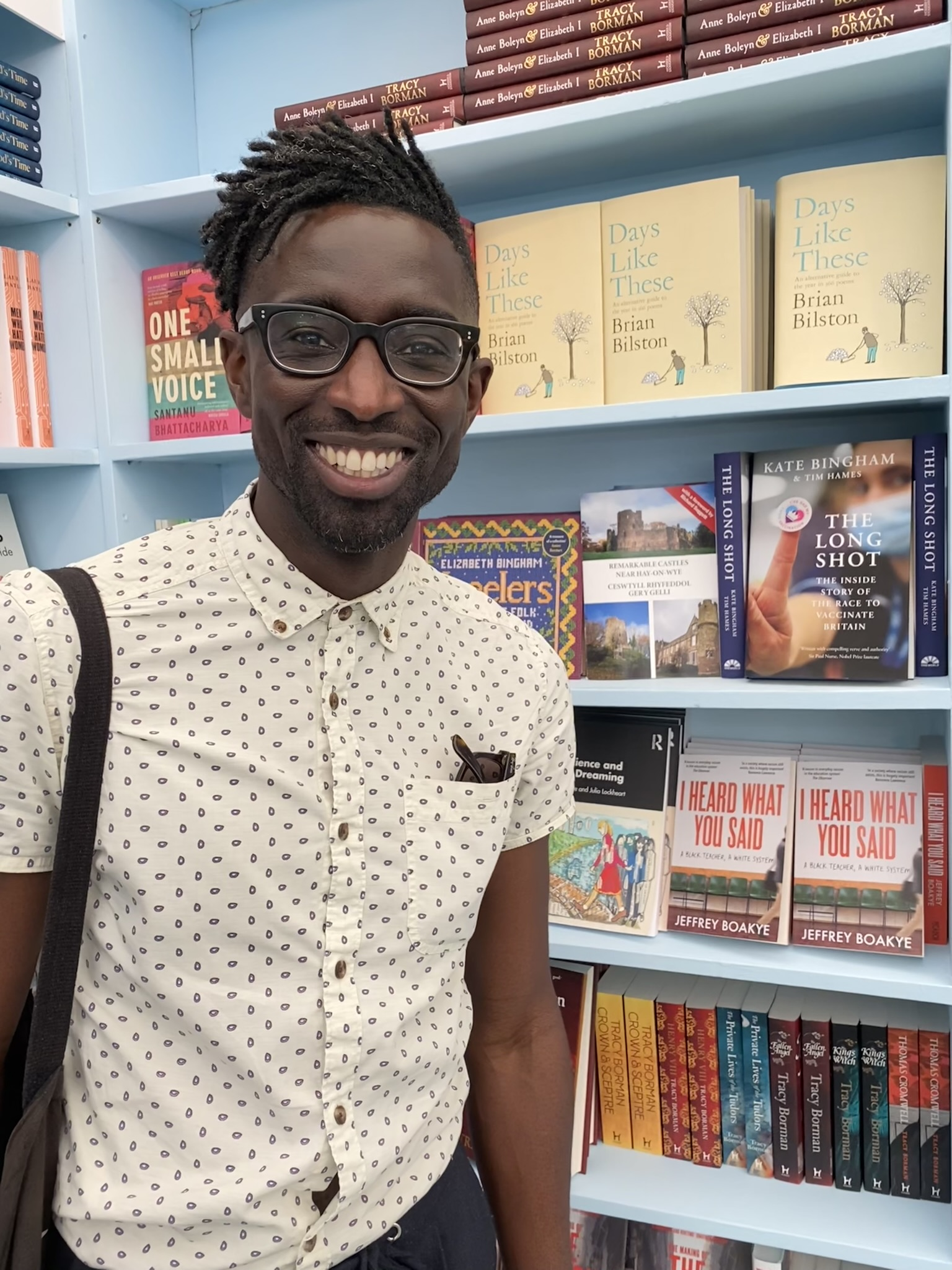
- Boakye in 2023
- Born: 22 March 1982 (age 44); Brixton, London, England
- Education: University of Leicester
- Occupations: Writer, teacher, journalist and broadcaster
- Notable credit: Add to Playlist
- Website: jeffreyboakye.com

Jeffrey Boakye (born 22 March 1982) is a British author, educator, broadcaster and occasional journalist. Since 2021, he has presented, alongside Cerys Matthews to March 2024 and Anna Phoebe from May 2024, the BBC Radio 4 programme Add To Playlist, which explores connections in music.

== Biography ==
=== Early years and education ===
Jeffrey Boakye grew up in Brixton in south London, United Kingdom. He is of Ghanaian heritage, his parents having migrated from Ghana to the UK in the 1970s. He attended Corpus Christi Primary School in Brixton before attending Salesian College, Battersea, then Wimbledon College. He studied English Literature at the University of Leicester, graduating in 2003.

=== Teaching ===
A teacher of English to 11- to 18-year-olds since 2007, he was appointed a Senior Teaching Fellow in Manchester Institute of Education (MIE), University of Manchester, in 2022.

=== Writing ===
Boakye has written articles and comment pieces for publications including The Guardian, The Financial Times and the Royal Society of Arts Journal, and is the author of several books for adults as well as young readers. His most recent adult book is I Heard What You Said (2022), about which Joseph Harker of The Guardian said: "This book is essential reading for teachers, those who run educational institutions, parents – but perhaps most of all for those Black children who may be currently going through school not realising why they are made to feel small, out of step and unworthy. For them in particular, it could be a ray of hope."

=== Broadcasting ===
In 2021, Boakye made a pilot for a new BBC Radio 4 music programme called Add to Playlist, with Cerys Matthews. This emerged as a weekly Friday-night show, which Boakye continues to co-present and direct. Add to Playlist went on to win both the Prix Italia and Prix Europa in the music radio category in 2022.

== Personal life ==
Boakye is married to Sophie and the couple have two sons. After moving from London in 2018, the family now lives in East Yorkshire, in the north of England.

== Selected writings ==
=== Books ===
- Hold Tight: Black Masculinity, Millennials and the Meaning of Grime (Influx Press, 2017)
- Black, Listed: Black British Culture Explored (Dialogue Books, 2018)
- What is Masculinity? Why Does it Matter? And Other Big Questions (2019; longlisted for the Information Book Awards)
- Musical Truth: A Musical History of Black Britain in 28 Songs (Faber Children's, 2021; longlisted for the Yoto Carnegie Medal 2022 and shortlisted for the Jhalak Prize Children's & YA 2022)
- I Heard What You Said (Picador, 2022)
- Kofi and the Rap Battle Summer (Faber Children's, 2023; shortlisted for The Week Junior Book Awards 2024, Children's Book of the Year: Older Fiction and nominated for the Yoto Carnegie Medal for Writing 2024)
- Musical World: Modern World History as You’ve Never Heard it Before (Faber Children's, 2023)
- Kofi and the Secret Radio Station (Faber Children's, 2024)

== Honours and awards ==
- 2022: Prix Italia and Prix Europa for Add to Playlist
- 2023: Honorary Degree of Doctor of Letters from the University of Leicester
