= Teach Us All =

2017 documentary film

- Directed by: Sonia Lowman
- Screenplay by: Sonia Lowman
- Produced by: The Lowell Milken center for Unsung Heroes
- Narrated by: Sarah Haufrect
- Distributed by: Netflix
- Release date: 25 September 2017 (United States)
- Running time: 80 minutes

Teach Us All is a 2017 documentary film written and directed by Sonia Lowman. It documents the inequality of schools in America, 60 years after the Little Rock Nine. The film was acquired by ARRAY and released on Netflix in 2017.

== Premise ==
Teach Us All is a documentary about the inequality of schooling in America. The film is split into three parts, discussing the teachers’, students’, and communities’ role in fighting for better education. It begins with an overview of the Little Rock Nine, including interviews with two of the original members of the group. It also features case studies on the current state of the U.S. Education system, focusing on Little Rock, Arkansas, New York City, and Los Angeles, California.

== Production and release ==
Teach Us All is the directorial debut of filmmaker Sonia Lowman. The film caught the attention of Ava DuVernay who acquired the film through ARRAY. Teach Us All premiered at the Ford Motor Company Theatre with the National Civil Rights Museum on the 60th anniversary of the Little Rock Nine. It was released on Netflix in September 2017.

== Reception ==
Ava DuVernay compared the film to her documentary 13th. Education Week wrote, "its message that much more work needs to be done to foster racial equity in the nation’s schools would be hard to disagree with." Common Sense Media wrote "the documentary strikes a hopeful note through interviews with students, teachers, administrators, and parents of all backgrounds who are trying to bring about positive change, diversity, and inclusion to our schools."
