= Percival Everett =

American writer and professor (born 1956)

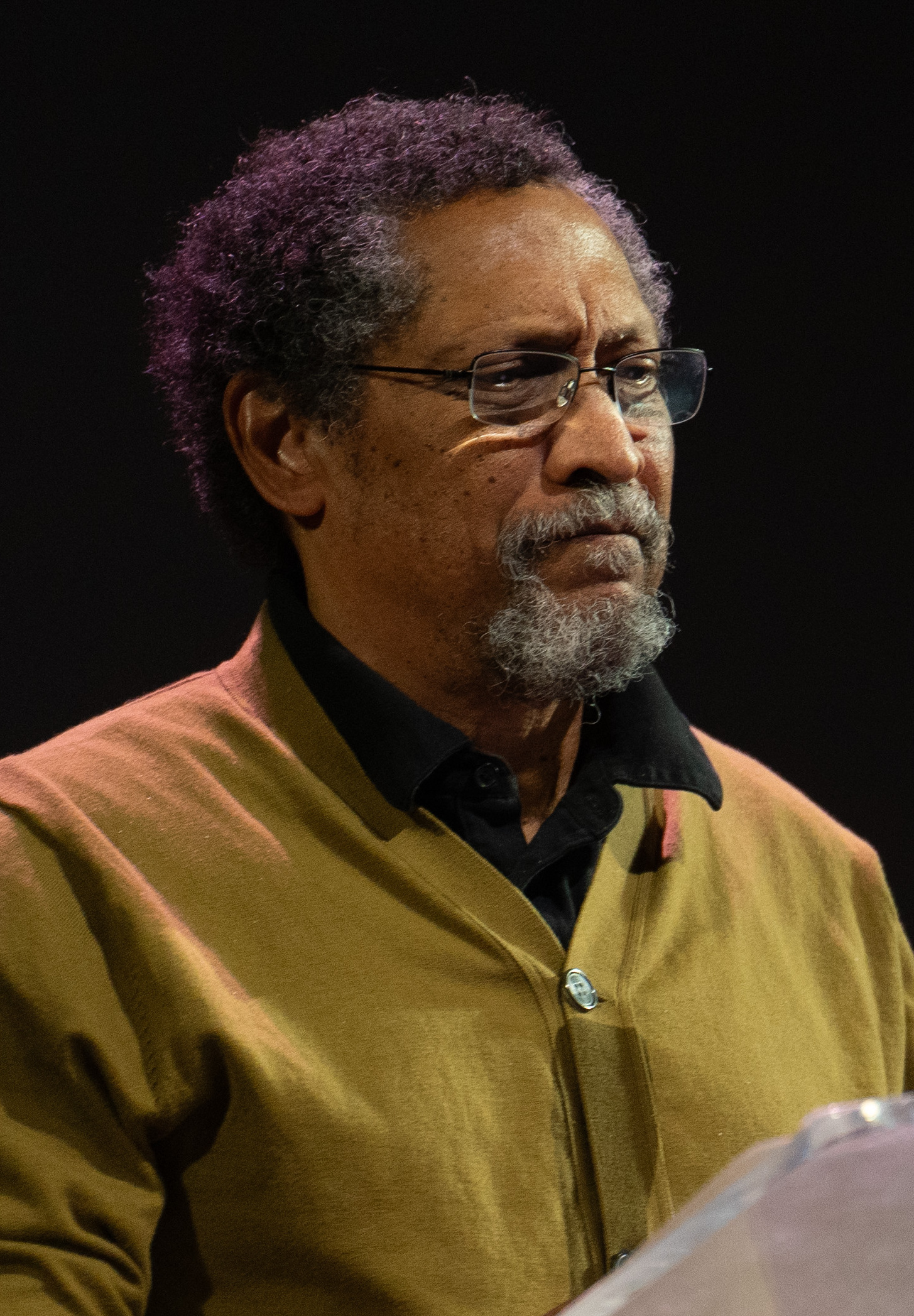
- Everett in 2024
- Born: Percival Leonard Everett II; December 22, 1956 (age 69); Fort Gordon, Georgia, U.S.
- Education: University of Miami (BA); Brown University (MA)
- Occupations: Novelist, story writer
- Spouse: Danzy Senna
- Children: 2
- Writing career
- Period: Contemporary
- Notable works: Erasure (2001); I Am Not Sidney Poitier (2009); The Trees (2021); James (2024)
- Notable awards: Hurston/Wright Legacy Award; Windham-Campbell Prize for fiction, 2023; National Book Award for Fiction, 2024; Pulitzer Prize for Fiction, 2025

Percival Leonard Everett II (born December 22, 1956) is an American author and Distinguished Professor of English at the University of Southern California. He has described himself as "pathologically ironic" and has explored numerous genres such as western fiction, mysteries, thrillers, satire and philosophical fiction. His books are often satirical, aimed at exploring race and identity issues in the United States.

Everett has written more than thirty works of fiction and poetry. He is best known for his novels Erasure (2001), I Am Not Sidney Poitier (2009), and The Trees (2021), which was shortlisted for the 2022 Booker Prize. His 2024 novel James, also a finalist for the Booker Prize, won the Kirkus Prize, the National Book Award for Fiction, and the Pulitzer Prize for Fiction.

Erasure was adapted as the film American Fiction (2023), written and directed by Cord Jefferson, starring Jeffrey Wright, Sterling K. Brown, and Leslie Uggams.

== Personal life and education ==
Percival L. Everett, named after his father, was born in Fort Gordon, Georgia, where his father, Percival Leonard Everett, was a sergeant in the U.S. Army. His mother was Dorothy (née Stinson) Everett. When the younger Everett was still an infant, the family moved to Columbia, South Carolina, where he lived through high school. He has a sister, Denise Everett, a physician in Raleigh, North Carolina. His father became a dentist and his parents continued to live in South Carolina. The younger Everett eventually moved to the American West.

Everett earned a bachelor's degree in philosophy from the University of Miami. He studied a broad variety of topics, including biochemistry and mathematical logic. In 1982, he earned a master's degree in fiction from Brown University.

Everett lives in Los Angeles, California, as of 2015, with his wife, the novelist Danzy Senna, and their two children.

Everett's great-grandmother was at one point enslaved.

== Literary career ==
While completing his M.A. degree, Everett wrote his first novel, Suder (1983). His lead character was Craig Suder, a Seattle Mariners third baseman in a major league slump, both on and off the field.

Everett's second novel, Walk Me to the Distance (1985), features veteran David Larson after his return from Vietnam. Larson becomes involved in a search for the developmentally disabled son of a sheep rancher in Slut's Hole, Wyoming. The novel was later adapted, with an altered plot, as an NBC-TV movie titled Follow Your Heart. Everett disowned this adaptation, stating: "I never saw it. I read the script, and I didn't like it. The changes that they made were so grotesque, there was no way to embrace that at all."

Cutting Lisa, Everett's third novel (1986; reissued 2000), begins with John Livesey meeting a man who has performed a Caesarean section. This prompts the protagonist to evaluate his relationships.

In 1987, Everett published The Weather and Women Treat Me Fair: Stories, a collection of short stories set mostly in the contemporary western United States.

In 1990, Everett published two books: Zulus, which combines the grotesque and the apocalypse; and For Her Dark Skin, a new version of Medea by the Greek playwright Euripides.

Switching genres, Everett next wrote a children's book, The One That Got Away (1992). This illustrated book for young readers follows three cowboys as they attempt to corral "ones", the mischievous numerals.

Returning to novels, Everett published his first book-length western, God's Country, in 1994. In this novel, Curt Marder and his black tracker Bubba search "God's country" for Marder's wife, who has been kidnapped by bandits. Marder is not sure whether he wants to find her. The book is a parody of westerns and the politics of race and gender. It includes a cross-dressing George Armstrong Custer.

In 1996, Everett published two books: Watershed has a contemporary western setting, in which the loner hydrologist Robert Hawkes meets a Native American "small person", who helps him come to terms with the interrelation of people. That year, Everett also published his second collection of stories, Big Picture.

In Frenzy (1997), Everett returned to Greek mythology. Vlepo, Dionysos's assistant, is forced to undergo a "frenzy" of odd activities, including becoming lice and bedroom curtains at different times during the story, which he narrates. These events occur so that he can explain these experiences to Dionysos, the demi-god.

Glyph (1999) is the story within a story of Ralph, a baby who chooses not to speak but has extraordinary muscle control and an IQ nearing 500. He writes notes to his mother on a variety of literary topics based on books she supplies. Ralph is kidnapped several times by parties trying to exploit his special skills. His odyssey (as "written" by four-year-old Ralph) teaches him more about love than intellect.

Grand Canyon, Inc. (2001) is Everett's first novella. In it, Rhino Tanner attempts to tame Mother Nature with a commercialization of the Grand Canyon.

Erasure (2001) is a satirical novel that portrays how the publishing industry pigeonholes African-American writers. The novel, a metafictional piece, revolves around the main character's decision to write an outrageous novella, based among the black urban poor and dissolute, titled My Pafology. The writer renames it as Fuck, wanting to push the edge of acceptability and influenced by what he calls ghetto fiction, such as Richard Wright's Native Son (1940) and Sapphire's novel Push (1996).

A History of the African-American People [proposed] by Strom Thurmond, as told to Percival Everett & James Kincaid [A Novel] (2004), is an epistolary novel that chronicles the characters Percival Everett and James Kincaid as they work with US Senator Strom Thurmond (R-SC) (occasionally) and his aide's crazy assistant, Barton Wilkes. The latter orders the authors around even as he stalks them.

Also in 2004, Everett released a third collection of short stories, Damned If I Do: Stories, as well as the novel American Desert. In American Desert, Ted Street plans to drown himself in the ocean but is killed in a traffic accident on the way there. Three days later, Street suddenly sits up in his casket at the funeral, although his head is severed and he lacks a beating heart. Throughout the rest of the novel, Street undergoes an odyssey of self-discovery about what being alive really means, exploring religion, revelation, faith, zealotry, love, family, media sensationalism, and death.

Wounded: A Novel (2005) tells the story of John Hunt, a horse trainer confronted with hate crimes against a homosexual and a Native American. Hunt avoids getting mixed up in the political nature of these crimes, taking action only when he is forced to do so.

Everett's 2006 collection of poetry, re:f (gesture), features one of his paintings on the front cover. His 2010 poetry book, Swimming Swimmers Swimming, was published by Red Hen Press.

The Water Cure (2007) is a novel about Ishmael Kidder, who has had a successful career as a romance novelist until the death of his daughter, when his life takes a dark turn. In a remote cabin in New Mexico, Kidder has imprisoned a man he believes to be his daughter's killer. The book's title refers to one of the torture techniques Kidder uses on the man, namely waterboarding.

In 2009, Graywolf Press released I Am Not Sidney Poitier. The protagonist, named Not Sidney Poitier, meets challenges relating to identity and racial segregation across North America. He faces similar challenges in identity construction in relation to his adopted white father, Ted Turner.

Assumption: A Novel (2011) is a triptych of stories with some characters who have been in earlier Everett stories. The story "Big" returns to the character of Ogden Walker, deputy sheriff of a small New Mexico town. He is on the trail of an old woman's murderer. But at the crime scene, his are the only footprints leading up to and away from her door. As other cases pile up, Ogden gives chase and soon finds himself on the seamier side of Denver, in a hippie commune.

In 2013, Graywolf Press published Percival Everett by Virgil Russell: A Novel, a novel by Everett in which a man visits his father in a nursing home, where his father appears to be writing a novel from the point of view of his son. Eight years later, the same press published The Trees, a satirical novel about historic and contemporary lynchings in Mississippi, the South and across the US. (It was published in the UK by Influx Press.) The Trees won the Anisfield-Wolf Book Award and was shortlisted for the 2022 Booker Prize.

Dr. No, published by Graywolf Press in 2022, won the 2023 PEN/Jean Stein Book Award and was named a finalist for the 2023 National Book Critics award for fiction.

Everett received a 2023 Windham Campbell Prize for fiction.

In 2023, the film American Fiction was released, with a screenplay adapted by its director Cord Jefferson from Everett's 2001 novel Erasure. Among other awards, American Fiction won Best Adapted Screenplay at the 96th Academy Awards.

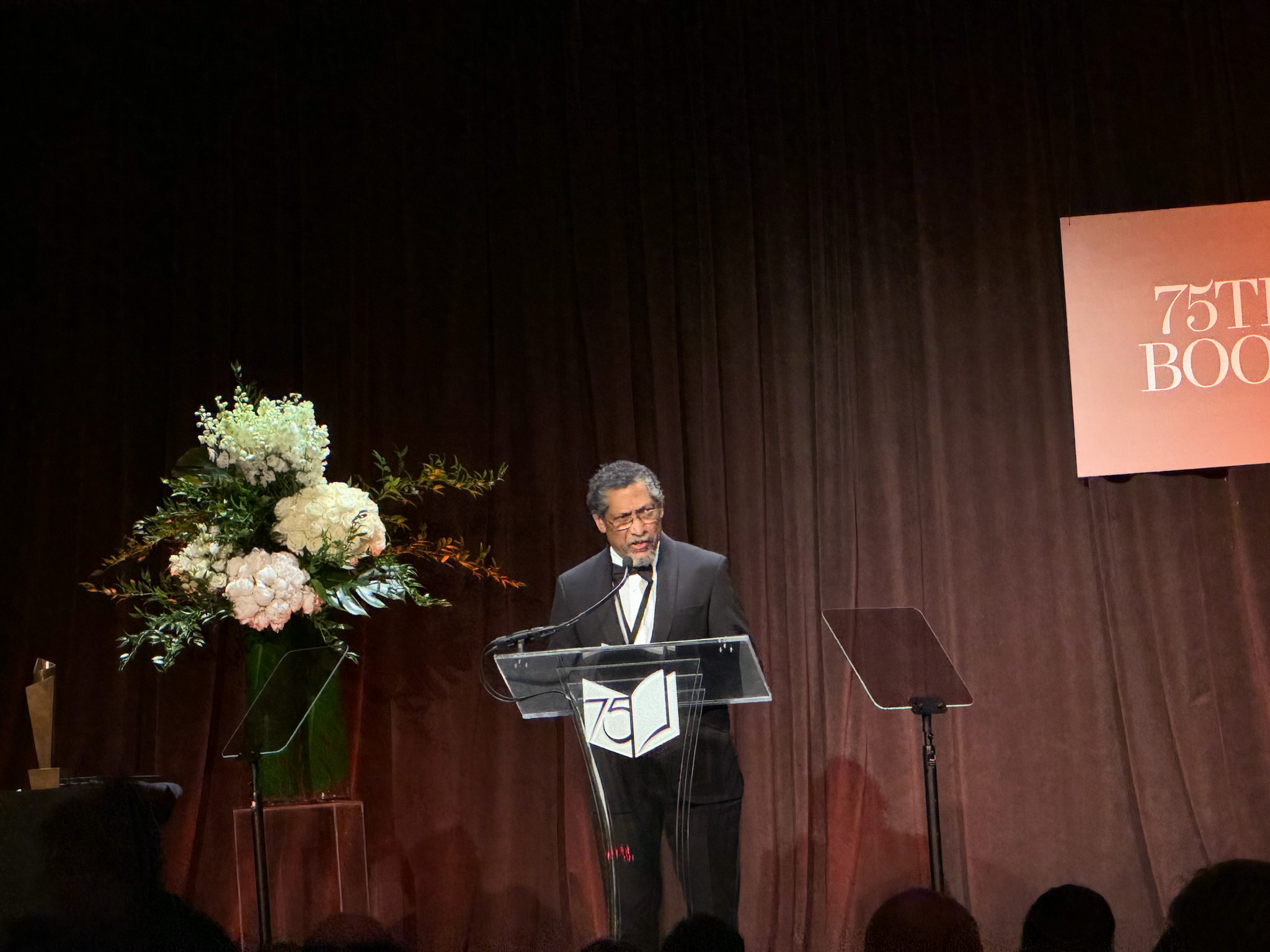
Everett accepting the National Book Award for Fiction in 2024

James, published by Doubleday in 2024, is a re-imagining of Mark Twain's Adventures of Huckleberry Finn from the perspective of the runaway slave character Jim. Everett humanizes the character, who goes by James, reinventing him as a wise and literate man, who has conversations with enlightenment philosophers in his dreams and teaches other enslaved people to read. James and the other black characters in the book hide their literacy and wisdom from the white characters, who would feel threatened by educated blacks and further punish them. Although opposed to book banning, Everett commented that he hoped his reimagined version would get banned "only because I like irritating those people who do not think and read". James was longlisted for the 2024 Booker Prize and chosen for the Booker Prize shortlist. The novel won the Kirkus Prize for Fiction, the National Book Award for Fiction, and the Pulitzer Prize for Fiction.

In 2025, the Chicago Public Library Foundation gave the Carl Sandburg Literary Award to Everett.

== Bibliography ==
=== Novels ===
- Suder (Viking Books, 1983)
- Walk Me to the Distance (Ticknor & Fields, 1985)
- Cutting Lisa (Ticknor & Fields, 1986)
- Zulus (The Permanent Press, 1990)
- For Her Dark Skin (Owl Creek Press, 1990)
- God's Country (Faber & Faber, 1994)
- Watershed (Graywolf Press, 1996)
- The Body of Martin Aguilera (Owl Creek Press, 1997)
- Frenzy (Graywolf Press, 1997)
- Glyph (Graywolf Press, 1999)
- Grand Canyon, Inc. (Versus Press, 2001)
- Erasure (University Press of New England, 2001)
- A History of the African-American People (proposed) by Strom Thurmond, as told to Percival Everett and James Kincaid (with James Kincaid) (Akashic Books, 2004)
- American Desert (Hyperion Books, 2004)
- Wounded (Graywolf Press, 2005)
- The Water Cure (Graywolf Press, 2007)
- I Am Not Sidney Poitier (Graywolf Press, 2009)
- Assumption (Graywolf Press, 2011)
- Percival Everett by Virgil Russell (Graywolf Press, 2013)
- So Much Blue (Graywolf Press, 2017)
- Telephone (Graywolf Press, 2020)
- The Trees (Graywolf Press, 2021; UK: Influx Press)
- Dr. No (Graywolf Press, 2022)
- James (Doubleday Publishers, 2024)
- Serious Music (Doubleday Publisher, 2027)

=== Short stories ===
- The Weather and Women Treat Me Fair: Stories (August House Publishers, Inc., 1987)
- Big Picture: Stories (Graywolf Press, 1996)
- Damned If I Do: Stories (Graywolf Press, 2004)
- Half an Inch of Water (Graywolf Press, 2015)

=== Poetry ===
- re:f (gesture) (Red Hen Press, 2006), a collection of poetry
- Abstraktion und Einfühlung (with Chris Abani) (US: Akashic Books, 2008) (UK: Broken Sleep Books, 2026), a collection of poetry
- Swimming Swimmers Swimming (Red Hen Press, 2010), a collection of poetry
- There Are No Names for Red (a collaboration with Chris Abani; paintings by Percival Everett) (Red Hen Press, 2010), a collection of poetry
- Trout's Lie (Red Hen Press, 2015), a collection of poetry
- The Book of Training by Colonel Hap Thompson of Roanoke, VA, 1843: Annotated From the Library of John C. Calhoun (Red Hen Press, 2019)
- Sonnets for a Missing Key (Red Hen Press, 2024), a collection of poetry

=== Children's literature ===
- The One That Got Away (with Dirk Zimmer) (Clarion Books, 1992), a children's book

=== Contributions ===
- My California: Journeys by Great Writers (Angel City Press, 2004)
- Everett's introduction was added to the 2004 paperback edition of The Jefferson Bible.

=== As guest editor ===
- Ploughshares, Fall 2014 (vol. 40, nos 2 & 3)

== Awards and honors ==
Everett's stories have been included in the Pushcart Prize Anthology and Best American Short Stories.

Everett received an honorary doctorate from the College of Santa Fe in 2008. In 2015, he received a Guggenheim Fellowship in Fiction, as well as the Phi Kappa Phi Presidential Medallion from the University of Southern California.

In 2016, Everett was elected to the American Academy of Arts and Sciences, and in 2023 he was elected to the American Academy of Arts and Letters.

Everett was named on the Time 100 list of Most Influential People of 2025.

Awards for Everett and his writing
| Year | Title | Award | Result | Ref. |
|---|---|---|---|---|
| 1990 | Zulus | New American Writing Award | | |
| 1997 | Big Picture | PEN Oakland/Josephine Miles Literary Award | Winner | |
| 2002 | Erasure | Hurston/Wright Legacy Award for Fiction | Winner | |
| 2003 | | Arts and Letters Award in Literature from The American Academy of Arts and Letters | Winner | |
| 2006 | Wounded | PEN Center USA Award for Fiction | Winner | |
| 2010 | - | Dos Passos Prize | Winner | |
| 2010 | I Am Not Sidney Poitier | Believer Book Award | Winner | |
| 2010 | I Am Not Sidney Poitier | Hurston/Wright Legacy Award for Fiction | Winner | |
| 2010 | Wounded (Ferito) | Premio Gregor von Rezzori | Winner | |
| 2010 | "Confluence" (story) | Charles Angoff Award in Fiction from The Literary Review | Winner | |
| 2016 | | Creative Capital Award | Winner | |
| 2018 | So Much Blue | PEN Oakland/Josephine Miles Literary Award | Winner | |
| 2019 | - | Reginald Lockett Lifetime Achievement Award | Winner | |
| 2021 | Telephone | Hurston/Wright Legacy Award for Fiction | Winner | |
| 2021 | Telephone | Pulitzer Prize for Fiction | Finalist | |
| 2022 | Dr. No | National Book Critics Circle Award | Shortlist | |
| 2022 | The Trees | Bollinger Everyman Wodehouse Prize for Comic Fiction | Winner | |
| 2022 | The Trees | Booker Prize | Shortlist | |
| 2022 | The Trees | PEN/Jean Stein Book Award | Finalist | |
| 2022 | The Trees | Hurston/Wright Legacy Award | Winner | |
| 2023 | - | Los Angeles Review of Books/UCR Lifetime Achievement Award | Winner | |
| 2023 | - | Windham-Campbell Literature Prize for Fiction | Winner | |
| 2023 | Dr. No | PEN/Jean Stein Book Award | Winner | |
| 2024 | James | Booker Prize | Shortlist | |
| 2024 | James | Kirkus Prize for Fiction | Winner | |
| 2024 | James | National Book Award for Fiction | Winner | |
| 2025 | James | International Dublin Literary Award | Longlist | |
| 2025 | James | Pulitzer Prize for Fiction | Winner | |
