= Moving Pictures (magazine) =

Movie Pictures
- Editor-in-chief: Elliot V. Kotek
- Frequency: Quarterly
- First issue: 1989
- Final issue: 2012
- Country: United States
- Language: English
- Website: movingpicturesmagazine.com (Archived)

Moving Pictures was a quarterly magazine focusing on the film industry and the art of film.

It was published from 1989 to 2012. The corporate motto was "Going places other film magazines fear to tread".

== History ==
The Moving Pictures brand began publishing in 1989 at the Cannes Film Festival and Market. The magazine was published on a quarterly basis. In 2004, Moving Pictures underwent a major makeover. The prototype for the new magazine was launched at the 2004 Cannes festival, expanding coverage and distribution to a wider audience.

The editor-in-chief was Elliot V. Kotek from 2005 to 2009, then former The Hollywood Reporter editor Howard Burns and then Kotek again for three months in 2012 when he left to take the reins of Celebs.com. The magazine, which celebrated its fifteenth anniversary in 2005, was published by the Maitland Primrose Group. In 2007 Jay Milla was named by the Maitland Primrose Group as the publisher of the magazine, which was based in Los Angeles. The magazine ceased publication in 2012.
