= So Much Blue =

2017 novel by Percival Everett

- Author: Percival Everett
- Language: English
- Publisher: Graywolf Press
- Publication date: June 13, 2017
- Publication place: United States
- Media type: Paperback
- Pages: 242
- Award: California Book Award for Fiction (Silver) (2017)
- ISBN: 9781555977825
- OCLC: 957021362
- Preceded by: Percival Everett by Virgil Russell: A Novel
- Followed by: Telephone

So Much Blue is a novel by American writer Percival Everett first published in 2017 by Graywolf Press.

The novel is centered on Kevin Pace, an American abstract painter, as a "coming of middle-age" story, where he reflects on the three most defining periods in his life. The novel splits Kevin's life into the chapters containing his present, near past, and distant past: "House", "Paris" and "1979" respectively. While he struggles to reconcile with the secrets and events from his past, he also works on a secret painting dominated by the color blue.

Everett's straightforward writing style develops So Much Blue into a very structured story as he seamlessly switches between the three unique narratives in the novel. There are some parallels the novel makes to Don DeLillo's The Names and Alberto Moravia's Boredom creating a blend of the "shadowy doings of a failed marriage, a jaded painter-narrator", and a buddy picture.

The novel received the California Book Award for Fiction (Silver) in 2017, and it is known as one of Everett's best works. It has been praised by critics for its realism, simplicity, and tasteful execution of literary tropes.

== Summary ==
Kevin Pace is a 56-year-old African-American abstract painter living in Martha's Vineyard, a Massachusetts island. He has achieved some success with his art and lives a comfortable life, but he feels ambivalent about his career. He feels distant from his family, particularly his wife, Linda, and has never allowed them to see a secret painting he keeps in a barn outside their house, a painting he plans to destroy if he should die.

Kevin begins to reflect back on three separate events in his life: in May 1979, Kevin, in his early 20s and during his third year of graduate school at the University of Pennsylvania, joins his best friend, Richard Scott, in looking for Richard's older brother, Tad, who has gone missing in El Salvador.

In his 40s, while a happily married father of two, Kevin and Linda travel to Paris, France, as a romantic getaway to celebrate 20 years of marriage. While Linda is spending a night in Bordeaux with her old college roommate, Kevin attends a lecture at a museum at the Jardin du Luxembourg, and it is there he meets Victoire, a 22-year-old watercolorist art student studying at the École des Beaux-Arts. They meet at a café, and there is instant chemistry between them. They quickly start engaging in an affair, and Linda leaves Paris, while Kevin remains there for work.

In his home life, his children, Will and April, have grown older, and their relationship with their father has deteriorated. They appeared to have "little use for their father beyond the usual business of daily familial maintenance." Kevin sinks into a period of alcoholism and believes himself to be a harmless drunk, but he eventually quits cold turkey after the visible disapproval from his family. As a substitute, he buries himself into his private painting, which ends up becoming just as damaging to him and his family as the drinking. Despite their strained relationship, Kevin's 16-year-old daughter, April, confesses she is pregnant and makes him promise not to tell Linda, and he agrees.

While in El Salvador, Kevin comes to realize that he has accidentally arrived in the country while it is descending into a civil war. Kevin and Richard hire Bummer, an Vietnam veteran turned mercenary, to help them find Tad. While travelling the countryside looking for Tad, he and Richard come across the body of a murdered child and help her father bury it. Shortly after finding Tad, who was in the country doing business with Nicaraguan drug dealers, the three men try to leave. As they are escaping, Bummer is shot dead by the drug dealers. When they return to the city, Kevin is waiting for Richard to pick up his passport, and he is attacked by a soldier and accidentally murders him in self defense.

In Paris, Kevin and Victoire continue their affair, and Kevin learns that she has a boyfriend. Despite this, he continues to pursue their relationship. He and Victoire go on dates in Paris, and he avoids telling Linda about the affair, but Kevin remains determined to return to his home and his family. Before he leaves, Kevin confesses the secret of what happened in El Salvador to Victoire. He also allows himself to be emotionally open with Victoire, telling her he loves her while realizing he has never loved Linda. He abruptly cuts off their affair when his son Will gets sick, and he returns home.

Back in his home life, he continues to keep April's secret only for it to be revealed when she miscarries at home. Both Linda and April are furious that Kevin did not tell Linda about the pregnancy. Kevin decides to return to El Salvador, where he manages to track down the father of the young girl he buried. He finds the event cathartic and returns home finally showing Linda the secret painting he has kept from her for years.

== Themes ==
=== Marriage ===
So Much Blue exhibits the issues that can occur when marriages are built upon secrets. Kevin's secret affair and painting harm his marriage, even if they are undisclosed. A New York Times article by Gerald Early argues that Everett's novel demonstrates that "marriage is about trying to sustain one’s inviolate self against the encroachment of the familial maw. It entails living with the guilty feeling that one ought to abandon this unruly attachment to one’s interiority in order for matrimony to be the union of trust it is supposed to be. Marriage is about the need to thwart openness while paying homage to it." Ultimately, Kevin never reveals the truth about his affair to Linda, but instead he reveals his secret painting to her. His marriage, while healing, remains not completely honest.

=== Color ===
Throughout the novel, color is heavily utilized to demonstrate Kevin's relationship to the things in his life. The novel uses the colors as metaphors for Kevin's emotion. For example, blue is a very important color uses in the novel; Kevin's secret painting is dominated by this color. Yet, he admits he is "uncomfortable with the color blue," and "[Blue is] the color of trust, loyalty, a subject for philosophical discourse, the name of a musical form, blue was not [his]." The color blue haunts Kevin because it is constantly returns throughout his life, but he cannot escape the dread that it gives him.

Saffron is another color that represents Kevin's emotions. It is used to demonstrate his "guilty guiltlessness" for his affair in Paris. Eventually, this color manifests in one of his paintings at the art gallery show. Kevin comments that the painting "having many reds" was unusual, and he "never thought [he] had control of the work." In the novel, Kevin's paintings and the colors he uses come out uncontrollably just like his emotions. Painting acts as Kevin's way of communication and expression.

== Characters ==
- Kevin Pace - African-American abstract painter living in the Northeast in a "very arty and New Englandy" home. He is a recovering alcoholic and distant father, and he grapples with his past in El Salvador and Paris.
- Linda Pace - Kevin's wife, mother of his two children who grounds him to his life in the U.S.
- Richard Scott - Kevin's best friend and retired Beowulf scholar, who Kevin accompanies to El Salvador in search of Richard's brother Tad.
- Victoire - young, seductive watercolorist living in Paris. She has an affair with Kevin despite knowing about his marriage and being in a relationship herself.
- The Bummer - sociopathic, Vietnam war veteran and war criminal turned mercenary living in El Salvador. He is employed by Kevin and Richard to help them search for Tad. He is shot dead by Nicaraguan drug dealers working with Tad.
- April Pace - Kevin's daughter and oldest child. She becomes pregnant at 16 and confides in Kevin making him promise not to tell Linda.
- Will Pace - Kevin's son. When he was young, he was close with his father but as he started to get older they became more distant. He cares a lot for his sister April despite their fights.
- Carlos - photographer in El Salvador who keeps a binder of the deceased and sells information.

== Reception ==
So Much Blue was well received by critics and won the California Book Award for Fiction (Silver) in 2017. Everett's supporters have praised his straightforward, yet humorous and eloquent storytelling that culminate in a well developed and nuanced novel.

Kirkus Reviews lauded "the author’s deft plotting and wry wit sustain multiple levels of intrigue, not only about how each of the subplots resolves itself, but how they all fit together."

NPR called it "one of Everett's best books to date" and "thrilling book by a man who might well be America's most under-recognized literary master."

The New York Times review by Gerald Early concluded that "The familiarity of these characters and their desires, all a concoction of Kevin’s perspective, is, ironically, what makes the novel absorbing in its simplicity about bourgeois banality and the quest for expression." Early adds that "'So Much Blue' is never quite what you expect, only close."

Vulture called it "a quietly beguiling novel" and asserts "that [Everett's construction] of an edifice of clichés, sanded down and transformed into combustive elements, is a sign of his mastery of the form."
