= God's Own Country (disambiguation) =

God's Own Country is a phrase meaning an area or region supposedly favoured by God.

God's Own Country may also refer to:

- God's Own Country (2014 film), an Indian Malayalam-language drama film set in Kerala
- God's Own Country (2017 film), a British gay-themed drama film set in Yorkshire

== See also ==
- God's Country (disambiguation)
