= The Trees (Everett novel) =

2021 novel by Percival Everett

- First edition (US)
- Author: Percival Everett
- Language: English
- Genre: Literary fiction
- Publisher: Graywolf Press (US); Influx Press (UK)
- Publication date: September 21, 2021 (US) March 17, 2022 (UK)
- Publication place: United States
- Media type: Print, ebook, kindle, audiobook
- Pages: 308 pp
- Award: Anisfield-Wolf Book Award; Bollinger Everyman Wodehouse Prize; Hurston/Wright Legacy Award
- ISBN: 9781644450642 (paperback 1st ed)
- OCLC: 1268220252
- Dewey Decimal: 813/.54
- LC Class: PS3555.V34 T74 2021
- Preceded by: Telephone
- Followed by: Dr. No

The Trees is a 2021 novel by American author Percival Everett, published by Graywolf Press.

Set predominantly in the small town of Money, Mississippi, the novel follows a series of murders that seem to follow identical patterns.

== Summary ==
In Money, Mississippi, a white man called Junior Junior is found dead in his own home with the body of an unknown Black man beside him. When the bodies are taken to the morgue, it is soon discovered that the body of the unknown Black man has disappeared. The body is found again in the home of Junior Junior's cousin, Wheat, who has also been murdered. Shortly after, the body of the Black man disappears again.

Two Black detectives from the Mississippi Bureau of Investigation, Ed Morgan and Jim Davis, are sent to Money to investigate the situation. Ed and Jim go to a local bar frequented by the Black community of Money where they discover that both Junior and Wheat are relatives of Carolyn Bryant, a white woman who accused the teenage Emmett Till of making sexual advances at her leading to his lynching and death. Ed and Jim believe that the disappearing body bears a striking resemblance to Emmett Till's battered body.

More bodies begin to pile up around the country. Each features one or more white men who have been castrated with the bodies of Black or Asian men beside them. Ed and Jim are able to find the identity of the Black man found at the original crime scene. They trace it to a company that sells bodies for research. They also begin to suspect Gertrude Penstock, a white-passing waitress they met in Money, and her 105 year old great-grandmother Mama Z are involved in the original murders.

Unbeknown to Ed and Jim, this is revealed to be true as Gertrude and a group of like-minded Black individuals had orchestrated the deaths of Wheat and Junior Junior as retaliation for their fathers' part in murdering Emmett Till. However they are baffled by the other murders.

Reports of the other murders reveal that large groups of Black and Asian men who appear impervious to bullets, have started duplicating the murders orchestrated by Mama Z and Gertrude.

== Writing and development ==
To write the novel, Everett researched lynching in the United States. For this research, Everett purchased books dealing with elements of lynching, enough to incidentally develop a "lynching section in [his] library". Everett attributes the humor in his novels, including The Trees, to the influence of Mark Twain.

== Reception and accolades ==
=== Reception ===
Mary F. Corey, in a positive review published by the Los Angeles Review of Books, wrote that the novel included a "Twainian level of wit and meanness". Joyce Carol Oates called it "[r]eally profound writing...about subjects of great tragic and political significance. Carole V. Bell, in a review published by NPR, also praised the novel, writing that the book is a "combination of whodunnit, horror, humor and razor blade sharp insight".

=== Awards and honors ===
Awards for The Trees
Year	Award	Category	Result	Ref.
2022	Anisfield-Wolf Book Award	Fiction	Won	
2022	BCALA Literary Awards	Fiction	Shortlisted	
2022	Bollinger Everyman Wodehouse Prize	—	Won	
2022	Booker Prize	—	Shortlisted	
2022	CLMP Firecracker Award	Fiction	Finalist	
2022	Foyles Book of the Year	Fiction	Shortlisted	
2022	Hurston/Wright Legacy Award	Fiction	Won	
2022	Joyce Carol Oates Literary Prize	—	Finalist	
2022	Maya Angelou Book Award	—	Finalist	
2022	The Morning News Tournament of Books	—	Quarterfinalist	
2022	PEN/Faulkner Award	—	Longlisted	
2022	PEN/Jean Stein Book Award	—	Longlisted	
2023	International Dublin Literary Award	—	Shortlisted	

== Miniseries ==
In July 2025, a limited series adaptation at Universal Content Productions was announced with Marcus Gardley writing and executive producing. Sterling K. Brown, Da'Vine Joy Randolph and Winston Duke are in talks for lead roles, with Brown and Duke playing the detectives. A bidding war has subsequently been reported.
