= Walk Me to the Distance =

1985 novel by Percival Everett

- first edition cover
- Author: Percival Everett
- Language: English
- Publisher: Ticknor & Fields
- Publication date: 1985
- ISBN: 9780899193212
- Preceded by: Suder
- Followed by: Cutting Lisa

Walk Me to the Distance is the second novel by author Percival Everett, originally published by Ticknor & Fields in 1985, republished in 2015 by the University of South Carolina Press (including a new introduction by the author himself), and again by Knopf Doubleday in 2025. Like many of Everett's works, the novel highlights kinship, lawlessness, violence, humor, the American West, and the feeling of alienation within one's own country. The novel follows the exploits of David Larson, a Vietnam veteran, who flees his native Georgia looking for a new home, and eventually settles in a small ranching community in rural Wyoming. While Larson grows close to the community, he wrestles with the consequences after discovering a tragic case of child abuse.

== Story ==
Feeling alienated and rootless, Larson leaves his home of Savannah, Georgia on a westward road trip in search of a new community. While aimlessly driving thru Wyoming he combats boredom by shooting at jackrabbits out his driver's side window, when a misfire amusingly punctures the radiator of his car. The vehicle breaks down in a small town called Slut's Hole, where he must wait two weeks for his engine to be repaired. A local suggests that Larson board with sheep farmer Chloë Sixbury, a one-legged widow and ranch owner, who lives with her mentally disabled adult son, Patrick. Chloë learns her son Patrick has been engaging in bestiality; she chastises him and he flees the ranch in shame. It is assumed he either drowned in a river or escaped into the mountains.

Larson develops a close bond with Sixbury, learns to appreciate the wider the community, and decides to stay interminably. He takes up a mundane job at a local rest stop, where he seems to enjoy encounters with tourists, truckers, and sex workers. One day, a Vietnamese family visit and abandon their 7-year old daughter, Kyongja (the mother claims Larson had fathered the child during his war deployment, even though he did not). Unable to pronounce the girl's name, Larson elects to call her "Butch." He and Sixbury care for the child while law enforcement claim to be searching for her family.

One night, Kyongja disappears and a search patrol is formed by Larsen and a few other men from the community. They find her in an abandoned cabin, where she has been physcially and sexually abused by Patrick. The men are troubled by their findings; they choose vigilante justice by hanging Patrick.

As Kyongja recovers, Larson is haunted by his decision. He returns to Savannah to visit his sister, but feels no connection there. He returns to Slut's Hole, where Sixbury suffers a stroke, and Larson dedicates himself to supporting her and Kyongja.

== Publication ==
Everett began writing the novel in 1982, and finished within two years while living between Cape Cod and Annapolis, Maryland. By the time of its publication in 1985, the dust jacket for the novel claimed Everett was living with his wife Portland, Oregon. The novel is dedicated to writer R.V. Cassill.

== Reception ==
Initially, Walk Me to the Distance did not garner the same sort of critical appeal that Everett's first novel, Suder, did; critics argued that comparatively, Distance lacked humor and had shallow content. New York Times Book Review writer Wendy Smith writes that the "comic inventiveness" of his debut is "virtually absent here, replaced by a terseness that verges on blankness," adding that the novel's "laconic prose fails to create any resonance of theme or character." Writing for the Boston Review, Rosellen Brown criticized Everett for not making race a "tacit subject" in the novel. A reviewer for Kirkus contends that the novel is contrived, lacking in plot and dialogic complexity, while Publisher's Weekly similarly states the novel suffered from sparse prose and an ambiguous storyline.

However, some contemporary critical reviews have reacted much more warmly to the novel. Professor Robert H. Brinkmeyer, Jr., praises elements of the novel for being "Faulknerian in complexity and darkness." Professor Keith David Mitchell argues that the novel astutely positions the main character between a disdain for a rapidly changing country, against a romanticization of life in the American West, writing that Everett "thwarts and revises traditional tropes associated with" the American West. Writer Derek C. Maus has noted some of the biographical parallels between Larson, the protagonist, and Everett himself. And scholar Claude Julien has published multiple essays on the novel which examine the theme of violence.

== Film ==
In 1990, the novel was adapted as a made-for-television movie by NBC. Many alterations were made to the plot, rendering the film nearly incomprehensible from the novel. Everett, who had no involvement in development nor production, describes the entire process as a "terrible experience," stating that "My novel Walk Me to the Distance was made into a film whose title I won’t tell you because you might happen upon it. Even if you read my novel and then watch that film, you will not recognize it. Let’s not talk about it."
