= Influx Press =

British publishing house

- Founded: 2012; 14 years ago
- Founders: Gary Budden; Kit Caless
- Country of origin: United Kingdom
- Headquarters location: London, England
- Distribution: Turnaround
- Publication types: Fiction and non-fiction books
- Official website: www.influxpress.com

Influx Press is an independent British publishing company, based in north London, founded in 2012 by Gary Budden and Kit Caless. They are known for publishing "innovative and challenging fiction, poetry and creative non-fiction from across the UK and beyond".

== Background ==
Influx Press was founded by Gary Budden and Kit Caless as an independent publishing company based in North London. The first title to be published, in 2012, was Acquired For Development By…, edited by Budden and Caless, an anthology of commissioned short stories and poetry inspired by the London Borough of Hackney. Budden has said that he had not originally intended to set up a publishing company, "but after an internship at Richmond Literary Festival working with people like David Starkey and Quentin Letts, I realised I wanted to do something different to the mainstream", so with local donations and advice from other small publishers such as Penned in the Margins and Five Leaves, Influx Press was started.

Authors since published by Influx Press include Eley Williams, Shiromi Pinto, Adam Scovell, Annabel Banks, Gareth E. Rees, Fernando Sdrigotti, Jeffrey Boakye, Eliza Clark, Joel Lane, Juliet Jacques, Marie Ndiaye, Chimène Suleyman, and Percival Everett.

In 2018, Influx Press won the Republic of Consciousness Prize for Small Presses, sharing the award with author Eley Williams, whose debut collection Attrib. and other stories the company published to acclaim in 2017.

In 2022, the imprint received its first Booker Prize nomination for Percival Everett's novel The Trees, which was subsequently announced on the shortlist.

In 2026, Influx Press was acquired by Diversion Books.
