= God's Country (novel) =

1994 novel by Percival Everett

- first edition cover
- Author: Percival Everett
- Language: English
- Genre: Western fiction
- Publisher: Faber & Faber
- Publication date: 1994
- Media type: Print
- ISBN: 0-571-19832-5
- Preceded by: For Her Dark Skin
- Followed by: Watershed

God's Country is the sixth novel by author Percival Everett, published by Faber & Faber in 1994, and republished in 2003 by Beacon Press (including a new introduction by Madison Smartt Bell). The novel, a satirical parody of the American Western genre, is set in the Western Territories in 1871 and tells the story of Curt Marder, an ignorant, racist, down-on-his-luck white rancher who seeks revenge upon a group of marauders who kill his dog, burn his property, and kidnap his wife. Marder enlists the services of a black cowboy named Bubba, considered to be the best tracker in the West, to enact revenge and find his missing wife.

== Story ==
The story begins with Marder, observing from a distance, the pillaging of his property by a group of bandits. Marder is unable to tell whether they are a group of Native Americans, or white cowboys in disguise. The marauders kidnap his wife (Sadie), burn his house and barn, and shoot his dog (Blue) with an arrow. Unable (or perhaps unwilling) to intervene in time, Marder eventually seeks empathy from people in town (Dodge City), who seem more disheartened that his dog has been killed, than worried about his missing, kidnapped wife.

With no money to his name and many small outstanding debts, Marder asks around the local saloon for information and help, and learns the legend of the region's best scout, Bubba, who happens to be helping out a local rancher named Tucker.

Before departing to find Bubba, Marder is approached by a young child named Jake, who claims that his parents had been murdered by renegades, and is also seeking revenge. Marder assumes the child is a boy, but would later learn that she is a girl named Jen Stinson.

Marder and Jake set out for the Tucker ranch where they find Bubba. Marder shows him the arrow that was used to kill Blue, and Bubba confirms its poor craftsmanship is not the work of Native Americans, but the work of a white man named Donald Gerlach, who leads a group of bandit "Injun inpersonators".

Using his 52-acre homestead as leverage, Marder offers to give half to Bubba in return for his help in finding Gerlach. Bubba reluctantly agrees.

From there, Bubba, Stinson, and Marder set out to track the looters, and encounter a variety of adventures along their journey, some of which are humorous (confronting General Custer in a brothel, dressed in drag); some of which are heinous (the massacre of a Native American tribe by the U.S. Army Seventh Cavalry).

What Bubba does not know is that Marder has betrayed him; Marder has lost his property in a game of poker, cheated by a bar patron named Wide Clyde, and withholds this information from Bubba throughout the entire story. Marder is given other opportunities to recover some wealth; he sells out the Native Americans by sharing their location with Custer's Cavalry, in return for cash. But he is incapable of holding on to it, and never plans to share any profits earned with Bubba.

Bubba eventually learns of these digressions, and leads Marder to the bottom of a canyon, where Gerlach's men are camped out at the top. Bubba, tired of Marder's deceptions, informs him that while he took him this far, he's done tracking. Marder angrily pulls a pistol, shoots Bubba multiple times in the back. Bubba stumbles onto his horse, uttering "You cain't kill me," and rides off.

== Characters ==
Curt Marder – the novel's oblivious, racist, and narcissistic first-person narrator (mistakenly called "Dirt Martin" by some); Marder lacks empathy and intellect, and is often only concerned about his own affairs, rarely considering the plights of others.

Bubba – a black cowboy and runaway slave who escaped his master's plantation in Virginia, is first described as a "the best tracker in the territory…a legend." Bubba is the novel's true protagonist, and the only character in the story with a moral compass. He reluctantly agrees to help Marder in exchange for a parcel of his land. Bubba is an excellent shot with his pistol, and rides a mule instead of a horse, asserting that it is less likely to be stolen by thieves.

Jen Stinson - a young child who approaches Marder after hearing about his intentions to track down outlaws; the child claims that a group of white outlaws murdered his parents. Dressed as a boy, Jen tells Marder her name is "Jake" and claims to be 16. Bubba shoots a man who attempts to rape Jen, which is when Marder learns she is a girl.

Sadie Marder – Curt's kidnapped wife, who only appears in the opening chapter, is seen thrown over the saddle of one of the marauder's horses, "swearing a blue streak" at them.

Blue – Marder's dog, who is killed by an arrow in the opening chapter by the hooligans.

Donald Gerlach – never seen in the novel, Gerlach leads a group of outlaws who often dress as "Injun inpersonators." Gerlach's men are responsible for taking Sadie, and also likely for the death of Jen's parents.

Terkle (Terk) – a red-headed saloon keeper in Dodge City whom Marder owes a small debt.

Clyde McBride (Wide Clyde) – Dodge City resident who beats Marder in a game of poker and dupes him into signing over his 52-acre property.

Taharry – a poker-playing man with a lisp, who suggests Marder solicits the services of Bubba.

Tucker – a local rancher who employs the services of Bubba; he is stubborn, skeptical, and married to a woman Marder reproachfully describes as a "squaw".

Big Elk, Red Eagle, Running Deer, & Happy Bear – Native Americans (likely Arapaho), who are friendly with Bubba. They have been uprooted by the U.S. Army's Cavalry, but remain generous to certain people (they give Jake/Jen Stinson her own horse).

Loretta – a prostitute who Marder meets during his journey; under the tutelage of Simon Phrensie, a bible vendor and preacher, they have left Kansas City for a small but growing western town called "Cahoots", presumably to establish a brothel. Marder and Bubba help the group, which includes two other would-be prostitutes named Fannie and Roberta, rebuild their broken stagecoach. Throughout the story, Marder often daydreams more about Loretta than he does his abducted wife Sadie. Loretta eventually agrees to be a foster mother to Jen.

== Reception ==
The novel is interpreted to be a commentary on a variety of subjects, including American racism, literary genres and tropes, power, deception, humor, and community. Scholar James J. Donahue writes that Everett's novel reads like "a checklist of popular Western genre tropes to...demonstrate how they collectively contribute to the genre's heavy reliance on racism", calling it "one of the most powerful commentaries on race that has been produced in recent years." Professor Keith B. Mitchell states that God's Country is "a very funny parody of the American western, reminiscent of Mel Brooks's Blazing Saddles but which, like the film, addresses important issues surrounding race, community, Otherness, and responsibility." David Bowman, writing for The New York Times, generally praises the novel, writing that it "sears… [it] starts sour, then abruptly turns into Cowpoke Absurdism, ending with an acute hallucination of blood, hate and magic." Publishers Weekly would write that Everett's text is a "corrosively funny and disquieting picaresque novel," which addresses "the politics of identity and the racist brutality that marked America's westward expansion after the Civil War."
