= James R. Kincaid =

American academic

James R. Kincaid is an American academic, currently the Aerol Arnold Professor of English at the University of Southern California. His Erotic Innocence (1998) discusses the sexualization of children in mainstream culture.

Kincaid received the Raubenheimer Award for Teaching and Scholarship in 2000.

== Works ==
- Dickens and the Rhetoric of Laughter 1972
- Tennyson's Major Poems 1975
- Novels of Anthony Trollope 1977
- Child-Loving: The Erotic Child and Victorian Culture 1992
- Annoying the Victorians 1994
- My Secret Life 1996
- Erotic Innocence: The culture of child molesting 1998
- Lost 2012
- The Daily Charles Dickens, A Year of Quotes, University of Chicago Press, 2018
