= Penance (2009 film) =

- Directed by: Jake Kennedy
- Written by: Jake Kennedy
- Produced by: Micah Goldman; Michael Wormser
- Starring: Marieh Delfino; Jason Connery; Michael Rooker; Graham McTavish
- Cinematography: Lawles Borque
- Edited by: Asi Assili
- Music by: Ryan Dodson
- Distributed by: Clever Worm Entertainment
- Release date: May 30, 2009 (Fangoria)
- Country: United States
- Language: English
- Budget: $1.5 million

Penance is a 2009 American horror film directed by Jake Kennedy. It stars Jason Connery, Marieh Delfino, Graham McTavish, and Michael Rooker. Horror film icon Tony Todd has a cameo role as a sinister chauffeur.

== Plot ==
A young mother decides to become a stripper to earn some fast cash only to find her worst nightmares are about to begin when she falls into the hands of a religious fanatic intent on changing her "evil" ways.

== Cast ==
- Marieh Delfino as Amelia
- Graham McTavish as Geeves
- Jason Connery as John
- Valorie Hubbard as Kathy
- Lochlyn Munro as Jack
- Allison Lange as Tara
- Michael Rooker as Mann
- Tony Todd as Chauffeur
- James Duval as Guy

== Release ==
On November 17, 2009, an unrated Director's Cut was released on DVD by Independent Media Distribution. It was later released by Allegro Corporation on October 22, 2013.

== Reception ==
Nicolas Rapold for The New York Times was generally positive in his review. However, Mike D'Angelo for The Dissolve was less positive, saying the film was "painfully repetitive and monotonous".
