= Queen Mimi =

Documentary film about the life of Marie Haist

- Directed by: Yaniv Rokah
- Written by: Yaniv Rokah
- Produced by: Elliot V. Kotek; Michael Pelico; Michael Shamberg
- Starring: Zach Galifianakis; Stan Fox; Marie Haist (Mimi)
- Cinematography: Andrew Fox
- Edited by: Ally Garrett
- Music by: Ron Passaro
- Distributed by: XLrator Media
- Release dates: March 27, 2015 (Vail Film Festival); May 2016
- Running time: 76 minutes
- Country: United States
- Language: English

Queen Mimi is a 2015 documentary film about the life of Marie "Mimi" Haist, an octogenarian homeless woman who lived in a Santa Monica laundromat for 18 years, directed by Yaniv Rokah and produced by Elliot V. Kotek.

== Release ==
The film was selected for the Sarasota Film Festival. In May 2016, XLrator Media released the film worldwide.

== Cast ==
- Mimi as Herself
- Zach Galifianakis as Himself
- Stan Fox as Himself

=== Awards and nominations ===
Year	Award	Festival	Result
2015	Best Documentary	Manhattan Film Festival	Won
2015	Spirit Award	Chagrin Documentary Film Festival	Won
2015	Spirit Award	Hot Springs Documentary Film Festival	Won
2015	Best Director Award	St Tropez International Film Festival	Won

== Soundtrack ==
Queen Mimi is a 2016 soundtrack album from the documentary containing a song by Grammy Award nominee Deana Carter titled "Celebrate Life", written by Ralph Stevens and Deana Carter.

== Relationship to Zach Galifianakis ==
Zach Galifianakis befriended Haist decades before the release of the documentary, paying her rent until her death for much of this duration despite not yet achieving widespread fame and fortune as a comic for much of this time. Haist had been rendered homeless in her 50s as a result of a divorce with her husband who had been unfaithful. Galifianakis maintained a close friendship with Haist, once taking her as a date on the red carpet for his movie The Hangover in 2009.

Haist died in 2021 at the age of 95.
