= Sonia Lowman =

American filmmaker

- Education: Master's degree
- Alma mater: London School of Economics
- Occupation: Filmmaker
- Years active: 2017–present
- Website: sonialowman.com

Sonia Lowman is an American filmmaker who is known for documentaries such as Teach Us All, Black Boys, War & Grace, and Indomitable.

== Early life and education ==
Lowman grew up in Santa Clarita, California and attended Valencia High School. Her father was an entertainment editor and movie/TV reporter from whom she learned about the film industry. She graduated from Boston University and holds a master's degree from the London School of Economics.

== Career ==
Prior to filmmaking, Lowman worked for various non-profits, including International Medical Corps, the Milken Family Foundation, and ran a youth outreach program for the International Monetary Fund. Lowman had no prior filmmaking experience prior to the release of her first film, Teach Us All. The film was released on Netflix in September 2017.

In 2020, Lowman released Black Boys, a documentary that addresses the dehumanization of young Black men in America. The film was released on Peacock and won numerous awards, including the Best Feature Length Documentary at the Montreal International Black Film Festival. She also wrote and directed War & Grace in 2020, a film about mothers and midwives in war zones, produced by Sienna Miller.

Lowman released the documentary Indomitable in 2024. The film was shot in Ukraine and documents the humanitarian crisis of the Russo-Ukrainian War.

== Filmography ==
Year	Film	Credit	Notes
2017	Teach Us All	Writer, director, producer	
2020	Black Boys	Writer, director, producer	
2020	War & Grace	Writer, director, producer	
2024	Indomitable	Writer, director, producer	
