= Eliza Clark (British author) =

British author

- Born: 4 May 1994 (age 32); Newcastle upon Tyne, England
- Occupation: Author
- Writing career
- Period: 2020–present
- Website: elizaclarkauthor.com

Eliza Clark (born 4 May 1994) is a British author, known for her novels Boy Parts (2020) and Penance (2023).

== Early life and education ==
Clark was born and raised in Newcastle upon Tyne.

Clark says she read keenly as a child, but was advised by her school not to go to study English at Oxbridge because she received C grades in her Maths and French GCSEs.

Clark studied art foundation, focusing on sculpture, before attending the Chelsea College of Arts, graduating in 2016. Her dissertation was on "how Michel Foucault's ideas of surveillance play out in the online era."

== Career ==
In 2016, Clark received funding from the New Writing North's Young Writer's Talent Fund and mentoring under Matt Wesolowski. She then worked at Mslexia magazine as a marketing assistant.

Clark said she wrote her debut novel Boy Parts (2020) in "eight months of weekends off from a day job at Newcastle’s Apple store" in 2016. Published under Influx Press, it went on to become Blackwell's fiction book of 2020 and a finalist for the Women's Prize for Fiction. Despite critical recognition, the novel was a sleeper hit before gaining popularity on TikTok. It follows Irina Sturges, a psychopathic erotic photographer whose fetish work sexually exploits men she scouts on the streets of Newcastle. The novel's unreliable narrator has been compared to the protagonists of Bret Easton Ellis's American Psycho and Ottessa Moshfegh's My Year of Rest and Relaxation. It was adapted into a one-woman show by Gillian Greer in 2023, running for six weeks at the Soho Theatre and starring Aimée Kelly.

In 2021 Clark signed a two book deal with Faber & Faber. In 2023, she was featured in Granta's 'Best of the Young British Novelists'. Her subsequent novel Penance (2023), a metafiction satirizing the true crime genre, was longlisted for the Dylan Thomas Prize in 2024. Narrated by disgraced journalist Alec Z. Carrelli, the novel examines a fictional 2016 murder of a teenager in a North Yorkshire seaside town, loosely based on the murders of Shanda Sharer and Suzanne Capper. Juno Dawson will adapt the novel for Altitude Television.

Clark's third book She's Always Hungry (2024) is a speculative fiction collection of eleven short stories. Financial Times praised the collection's "controlled blend of feminist dread and surreal eeriness" but found the quality of the short stories uneven. The New York Times, however, labeled it "one of the best collections of the year." In 2024, Clark was featured on the Forbes 30 Under 30 Europe list for media and marketing.

Contemporary online culture is a frequent subject in Clark's work. She has been active online since the age of eight or nine and wrote fanfiction for the video game series Mass Effect as a teenager, but has made an effort to distance herself from online discourse since becoming an author. She and her partner formerly ran the Twitter account GoodreadsBazaar, which was dedicated to "nonsensical Goodreads reviews."

Clark has cited Kazuo Ishiguro, Vladimir Nabokov, Ryū Murakami, Donna Tartt, Torrey Peters, and A. M. Homes, as influences.

Clark is currently a creative writing facilitator for young people through the Arvon Foundation.

== Bibliography ==
- Boy Parts (2020, Influx Press)
- Penance (2023, Faber & Faber)
- She's Always Hungry (2024, Faber & Faber)
