= Yaniv Rokah =

Israeli-American actor-director

- Citizenship: Israel
- Education: Film director, actor
- Notable work: Queen Mimi

Yaniv Rokah is an Israeli-American actor and film director.

== Early life ==
Yaniv Rokah grew up on the Mediterranean in Netanya, Israel. As a young adult, he moved to New York to become an actor.

== Career ==
Rokah moved to New York in 1999, and to Los Angeles in 2006. He attended New York's Lee Strasberg Theatre Institute.

Although Rokah landed some small acting roles, he first came to wider attention for his 2015 documentary film, Queen Mimi. The project was funded on Kickstarter.

The subject of the documentary, Marie 'Mimi' Haist, was a homeless woman living in a laundromat frequented by young, unknown actors and helping them do their laundry. Rokah decided to make a film about her. The film garnered substantial publicity while still in production when actor Zach Galifianakis, who had since become successful with The Hangover series, arranged to give her an apartment, which Renée Zellweger furnished.

== Filmography ==
Year	Title	Role	Notes
2009	The Beast	Adam De Figuredo	
2012	NCIS: Los Angeles	Ari Peretz	
2012	Kendra	Dr. Yaniv Rokah	
2013	World War Z	Israeli Camp Soldier	
2015	Queen Mimi	N/A	Director
