= Greg Scruggs =

American football player and coach (born 1990)

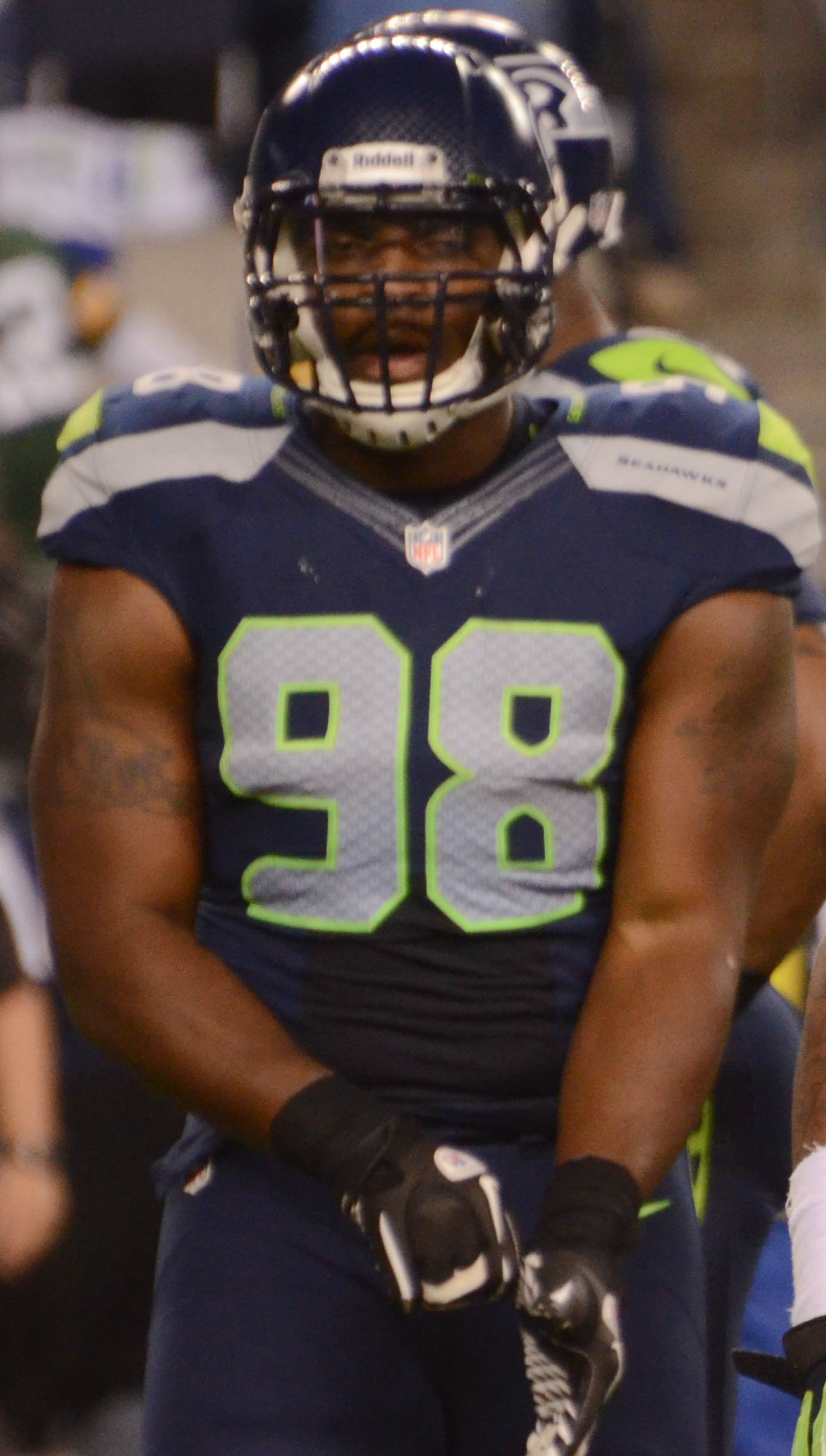
- Scruggs with the Seattle Seahawks in 2012

San Francisco 49ers
- Title: Assistant defensive line coach

Personal information
- Born: August 17, 1990 (age 36); Cincinnati, Ohio, U.S.
- Listed height: 6 ft 3 in (1.91 m)
- Listed weight: 277 lb (126 kg)

Career information
- Position: Defensive end (No. 98, 90, 87)
- High school: St. Xavier (Cincinnati)
- College: Louisville (2008–2011)
- NFL draft: 2012: 7th round, 232nd overall pick

Career history

Playing
- Seattle Seahawks (2012–2015); Chicago Bears (2015–2016); New England Patriots (2016)

Coaching
- Cincinnati (2018–2019) Director of player development; Cincinnati (2020–2021) Defensive line coach; New York Jets (2022) Assistant defensive line coach; Wisconsin (2023) Defensive line coach; San Francisco 49ers (2025–present) Assistant defensive line coach

Awards and highlights
- 2× Super Bowl champion (XLVIII, LI)

Career NFL statistics
- Total tackles: 11
- Sacks: 3.0
- Pass deflections: 1
- Stats at Pro Football Reference

Greg Scruggs (born August 17, 1990) is an American football coach and former defensive end in the National Football League (NFL). He is currently the assistant defensive line coach for the San Francisco 49ers of the NFL. Scruggs played college football for the Louisville Cardinals, and was selected by the Seattle Seahawks in the 2012 NFL draft. He also played professionally for the New England Patriots and the Chicago Bears. Scruggs was previously a defensive line coach for the New York Jets, Cincinnati Bearcats, and the Wisconsin Badgers.

== Early life ==
Scruggs was born in Cincinnati, and lived in the city's Winton Terrace housing project before joining the local Boys Hope Girls Hope residential program in 2003. As a student at St. Xavier High School in Cincinnati, he lived in the Boys Hope House on campus. After playing the quad drums in the school marching band for three years and varsity basketball for two, he reluctantly joined the football team his senior year, at the behest of head coach Steve Specht. Scruggs graduated in 2008.

== College career ==
Scruggs played defensive tackle for the University of Louisville Cardinals and graduated in 2011.

== Professional career ==
Pre-draft measurables
Height	Weight	40-yard dash	10-yard split	20-yard split	20-yard shuttle	Three-cone drill	Vertical jump	Broad jump	Bench press
6 ft 3 3/8 in (1.91 m)	284 lb (129 kg)	4.76 s	1.71 s	2.75 s	4.40 s	7.16 s	34.5 in (0.88 m)	9 ft 10 in (3.00 m)	25 reps
All values from Pro Day

=== Seattle Seahawks ===
Scruggs was selected as the 25th pick in the seventh round, 232nd overall, in the 2012 NFL draft by the Seattle Seahawks. NFL Network analyst Bucky Brooks stated that Scruggs is a competitive defensive end with toughness and will have to battle for a backup spot on the Seahawks' roster. On August 27, 2013, the Seahawks placed Scruggs on the reserve/physically unable to perform list. The Seahawks announced on August 31, 2015, they waived Scruggs, making him a free agent.

=== Chicago Bears ===
On December 31, 2015, Scruggs signed with the Chicago Bears. On January 3, 2016, Scruggs recorded his third career sack against the Detroit Lions.

During the 2016 offseason, Scruggs switched from the defensive end position to tight end. He was released by the Bears on September 27, 2016.

=== New England Patriots ===
On October 1, 2016, Scruggs was signed by the New England Patriots. He was placed on injured reserve on October 15, 2016, with a knee injury after being inactive for the first two games he was on the Patriots roster. Scruggs would not play when the Patriots won Super Bowl LI on February 5, 2017. Scruggs won his second Super Bowl championship after the Patriots defeated the Atlanta Falcons by a score of 34–28 in overtime.

== Coaching career ==
In 2018, Scruggs joined Luke Fickell's staff at the University of Cincinnati as the Director of Player Development. For the 2020 season, Scruggs was promoted to the defensive line coach for the Bearcats.

On March 3, 2022, it was reported that Scruggs accepted an assistant defensive line coach position with the New York Jets.

In 2023, Scruggs left the NFL to follow former Cincinnati head coach Fickell to coach the defensive line for the University of Wisconsin.

On March 6, 2024, Scruggs was officially hired by the University of Michigan to coach the defensive line. On March 21, Scruggs resigned following an intoxicated arrest that occurred on March 16. Scruggs did not coach a practice or game while with the Michigan Wolverines.

On February 25, 2025, the San Francisco 49ers hired Scruggs to serve as the team's defensive line coach.

== Personal life ==
Scruggs submitted the winning nomination of his high school coach, Steve Specht, for the 2013 Don Shula NFL High School Coach of the Year Award. He attended St. Xavier High School at the same time as Luke Kuechly.
