= Robin Swicord =

American screenwriter and film director (born 1952)

- Born: Robin Stender Swicord; October 23, 1952 (age 74); Columbia, South Carolina, U.S.
- Education: Florida State University
- Occupations: Screenwriter, director
- Years active: 1979–present
- Known for: The Curious Case of Benjamin Button
- Notable work: Little Women; The Jane Austen Book Club
- Spouse: Nicholas Kazan (m. 1984)
- Children: Zoe Kazan; Maya Kazan

Robin Stender Swicord (born October 23, 1952) is an American screenwriter, film director, and playwright, best known for literary adaptations. Her notable screenplays include Little Women (1994), Matilda (1996), Practical Magic (1998), Memoirs of a Geisha (2005), and The Curious Case of Benjamin Button (2008), the latter of which was nominated for the Academy Award for Best Adapted Screenplay and the Golden Globe Award for Best Screenplay. She wrote and directed the films The Jane Austen Book Club (2007) and Wakefield (2016).

Swicord is the wife of screenwriter Nicholas Kazan, and the mother of actresses Zoe Kazan and Maya Kazan. She is a member of the Academy of Motion Picture Arts and Sciences' Board of Directors.

== Early life ==
Swicord was born in Columbia, South Carolina, the daughter of Jean Carroll Swicord (née Stender) and businessman Henry "Hank" Grady Swicord II. Swicord's father was in the military, so the family moved often and she spent a large part of her childhood in Barcelona, Spain, until eventually settling in Florida. She has a brother, Steven Swicord.

Swicord said she always wrote as a child, and that later as she continued writing in college, became interested in screenplays because they were visual in nature.

She graduated from Florida State University, where she double-majored in English and Theater, with an emphasis on stagecraft. While at Florida State, Swicord worked as a photographer at the school newspaper, Florida Flambeau.

== Career ==
After college, while still in northwest Florida, Swicord made short films, eventually getting work as an industrial filmmaker in Atlanta, Georgia for IBM. IBM liked her work so much that they recommended Swicord for a job at their advertising agency in New York City where she worked as a copywriter.

With fellow alumni of Florida State University who were starting a theater company, Swicord wrote and helped produce two plays. An agent named Merrily Kane who saw one of the plays asked Swicord if she had considered writing for film. Swicord gave her a script called Stock Cars for Christ, which was sold to MGM, a job that required that she move to Los Angeles. Although the project was never produced, at MGM she was mentored by Lynn Arost, an MGM development executive who Swicord said gave her the experience and time during which she taught herself the craft of rewriting scripts. Another early mentor was Susan Froemke, an editor who often worked with the Maysles Brothers.

Her directorial debut was the 1993 short film The Red Coat, for which she also wrote the screenplay. The film was about her grandmother and starred Theresa Wright and Bridget Fonda.

For the 1994 film Little Women, Swicord conducted intensive research into Louisa May Alcott's personal diaries and family letters in order to recreate the period accurately. For over twelve years, she developed the project with film executive Amy Pascal. The studio wanted Winona Ryder to star, so producer Denise Di Novi, who had a longstanding working relationship with Ryder, joined as a producer. Ryder wanted a female director, which was an additional challenge, as the list of women directors from the studio was short. Gillian Armstrong (My Brilliant Career), who was on the list, was hired to direct.

During the process of writing the adaptation of The Perez Family, Swicord got to know the world of author Christine Bell's Miami.

Swicord worked with her husband, Nicholas Kazan, on the screenplay to Matilda, adapted from the Roald Dahl book, a children's book the couple loved reading to their daughters. Dahl's daughter, Lucy Dahl, was given script approval.

Swicord wrote the screenplay for Karen Joy Fowler's 2004 novel The Jane Austen Book Club and directed the film, which was released in the United States on September 21, 2007. The film was her feature film debut.

For 2005's Memoirs of a Geisha, Swicord worked collaboratively with director Rob Marshall to adapt Arthur Golden's novel. Although the project had been with other writers and directors, and there were many previous drafts of the script, Swicord said that she and Marshall started from scratch. Swicord was able to use Golden's original research and unedited manuscripts to construct the screenplay, which won a Golden Satellite Award for best adapted screenplay.

For over 10 years, Swicord worked on the screen adaptation of The Curious Case of Benjamin Button, based on the short story of the same name from F. Scott Fitzgerald's 1922 collection Tales of the Jazz Age. The project had been in development by producer Ray Stark for 20 years before she began working on the script. Swicord said that the adaptation was so loose that she felt that her work almost became an original screenplay. The script had a very long development period in Hollywood and was attached to many directors, actors, and studios. The eventual director of the film, David Fincher, hired Eric Roth, who rewrote much of Swicord's script.

Swicord has said she was influenced by the work of Billy Wilder and I.A.L. Diamond (Some Like It Hot, The Apartment) as well as Ben Hecht (Scarface, Nothing Sacred) and Joseph L. Mankiewicz (All About Eve). Her contemporary favorites include Eric Roth, Steve Zaillian, and Callie Khouri.

== Personal life ==
In 1984, Swicord married screenwriter Nicholas Kazan, who is the son of director Elia Kazan. Their daughters are actresses Zoe Kazan and Maya Kazan.

== Filmography ==
- 1980: Cuba Crossing – screenplay/story
- 1987: The Disney Sunday Movie (TV Series) – writer, 1 episode: "You Ruined My Life"
- 1989: Shag – screenplay with Lanier Laney & Terry Sweeney
- 1993: The Red Coat (Short) – writer, director
- 1994: Little Women (adapted from the book Little Women by Louisa May Alcott) – screenplay, co-producer
- 1995: The Perez Family (adapted from the book The Perez Family by Christine Bell) – screenplay, executive producer
- 1996: Matilda (adapted with Nicholas Kazan from the book Matilda by Roald Dahl) – screenplay, co-producer
- 1998: Practical Magic (adapted with Akiva Goldsman and Adam Brooks from the 1995 novel Practical Magic by Alice Hoffman) – screenplay, co-producer
- 2005: Memoirs of a Geisha (adapted from the book Memoirs of a Geisha by Arthur Golden) – screenplay
- 2007: The Jane Austen Book Club (adapted from the book The Jane Austen Book Club by Karen Joy Fowler) – screenplay, director
- 2008: The Curious Case of Benjamin Button (story credit with Eric Roth from the short story by F. Scott Fitzgerald) – story
- 2016: The Promise – screenplay (with Terry George)
- 2016: Wakefield – Screenplay, director. Based on the short story by E.L. Doctorow.
- 2019: When They See Us (TV Series) – writer, 2 episodes

== Unproduced projects ==
- The Rivals – About Eleonora Duse and Sarah Bernhardt
- The Mermaids Singing – based on the novel, The Mermaids Singing, by Lisa Carey
- The Jane Prize – about a family of Jane Austen scholars

== Theater ==
- Swicord, Robin. Last Days at the Dixie Girl Cafe. New York: Samuel French, 1983. ISBN 978-0-573-61917-5 OCLC 11344745
- Swicord, Robin. Criminal Minds. New York: Samuel French, 1984. ISBN 978-0-573-61942-7 OCLC 11613038

== Works and publications ==
- Peter J. Barton Productions, Alabama, and Alabama Public Library Service. Private Lives: Illiteracy, We Can't Afford It. Tallahassee, FL: Peter J. Barton Productions, 1980. OCLC 8467563
- Swicord, Robin. "Pioneer know-how -- Script Girls: Women Screenwriters in Hollywood by Lizzie Francke." Sight and Sound. London: British Film Institute. Volume 5, No. 2. February 1995. Page 36. ISSN 0037-4806
- Swicord, Robin. "Blonde ambition -- All About Eve directed by Joseph Mankiewicz." Sight and Sound. London: British Film Institute. Volume 5, No. 11. November 1995. Page 59. ISSN 0037-4806
- Swicord, Robin. "Scriptwriting from Soup to Nuts." Sight and Sound. London: British Film Institute. Volume 7, No. 11. November 1997. Pages 28–30, 33. ISSN 0037-4806
- Academy of Motion Picture Arts and Sciences. Architects of Dreams: Writers on Writing: Defeating the Blank Page. Beverly Hills, CA: Academy of Motion Picture Arts and Sciences, 2001. Academy seminar on August 15, 2001, at Academy Little Theater in Beverly Hills, California. Featured speakers Brian Helgeland and Robin Swicord moderated by Randy Haberkamp. OCLC 801281666
- Swicord, Robin. "Under the Skin: Adapting Novels for the Screen." Kranz, David L., and Nancy C. Mellerski. In/Fidelity: Essays on Film Adaptation. Newcastle, UK: Cambridge Scholars Pub, 2008. Literature/Film Association conference at Dickinson College, Carlisle, Pennsylvania in 2005. ISBN 978-1-847-18402-3 OCLC 474017773

== Leadership positions ==
- 2012–present: Academy of Motion Picture Arts and Sciences' Governor's Board
- Academy of Motion Picture Arts and Sciences' Nicholl Screenwriting Fellowship Committee Chair – Writers Branch
- University of Southern California Libraries, Scripter Awards – Selection Committee
- Writers Co-Op, Member
- Board of the Writers Guild Foundation
- Writers Guild’s Pension and Health Fund Trustee
- San Diego State University's Center for the Study of Women in Television & Film Advisory Board
