= The Arrangement (novel) =

1967 novel by Elia Kazan

- First edition
- Author: Elia Kazan
- Language: English
- Genre: Autobiographical
- Publisher: Stein and Day (HB) & Avon (PB)
- Publication date: 1967
- Publication place: United States
- Media type: Print (hardback & paperback)
- Pages: 544 pp (paperback edition)
- ISBN: 978-0681161252 (paperback edition)
- OCLC: 247122417
- Preceded by: America, America
- Followed by: The Assassins

The Arrangement is a 1967 novel by Elia Kazan, narrated by a successful Greek-American advertising executive and magazine writer living in an affluent Los Angeles suburb who suffers a nervous breakdown due to the stress of the way in which he has lived his life – the "arrangement" of the title. In 1969 Kazan made it into a film. The Arrangement was a best-seller and garnered generally favorable reviews but it has been out of print since the 1980s.

== Plot ==
The Arrangement is the first-person story of Evangelos Arness, aka Evans Arness, aka Eddie Anderson, a second-generation Greek-American World War II veteran, a son of an Anatolian rug merchant who went broke after Black Tuesday. He has come to use the name "Eddie Anderson" in his career as a self-loathing advertising executive and the name "Evans Arness" in his second career as a muck-raking magazine reporter, the career in which he ostensibly takes pride (Lincoln Steffens is his role model).

His personal life is just as duplicitous: to outsiders he is happily married but is in fact a compulsive adulterer with his wife Florence's "don't ask – don't tell" tacit approval, one aspect of the titular "arrangement". His serial adultery ends when he begins a liaison with a female assistant at his advertising firm, Gwen Hunt, whose independent mind fascinates him; he becomes obsessed with her, perhaps even feeling true love towards her. He fails to lock a drawer with their nude photographs, perhaps subsconsciously wanting to be found out; a prying maid discovers them and shows them to Florence (and before that, it turns out, to their adopted daughter, now a university student). Florence persuades him to leave Gwen and to re-invigorate their life with a self-improvement regimen; both seem perfectly content though somewhat dull but after several months he crashes his car in an apparent suicide attempt.

The rest of the novel deals with his inability to return to his old role as he attempts to find a new life in which he can be who he authentically is rather than who others desire him to be or whom he has sold people on his being. He has to return to New York City, where he left his parents and brother after college, to deal with his father's dying. After several false starts, in which the newly "authentic" Eddie is arrested for indecent exposure, burns down his parents' house, a symbol of his father's tyranny over the family, is later shot by Gwen's jealous suitor, and is subsequently committed to a mental hospital, Eddie settles down with Gwen in Connecticut as a liquor dealer and starts to write short stories.

== #1 best-seller ==
The Arrangement entered The New York Times Best Seller list on the week of February 26, 1967 and became #1 for the week of March 26, the first of 14 straight weeks through the week of May 28. The novel returned to the #1 spot on the weeks of June 18 and July 2 before beginning an 11-week run at the top from the week of July 16 through September 24. The Arrangement dropped out of the New York Times Top 10 after the week of December 10 after spending 42 weeks on the list.

== Critical reaction ==
The novel was seen by some as being partially autobiographical; the narrator, like Kazan, is a Greek-American and a political liberal who had briefly been a member of the Communist Party USA in the 1930s before becoming disillusioned with it. Arness is also familiar with many lower-tier figures in the Hollywood film industry, which is where Kazan had achieved his greatest fame. Kazan decreed that the work was entirely fiction; the character was some 15 years younger than Kazan, who had not fought in World War II.

Critical reaction was largely favorable, although some critics expressed surprise that Kazan would launch a career as a novelist in his late 50s. (In reality, Kazan had written a previous novel about a Greek immigrant and his friend, an Armenian immigrant, called America, America and made it into a film.) John Barkham of Saturday Review stated "The theater's loss is literature's gain: Elia Kazan has written a striking novel." Life was so effusive in its review that an excerpt from it became the blurb on the dust jacket of a later printing. Honor Tracy of The New Republic wrote, "It is impossible, in a short space, to give a work so rich, complex [and] subtle its due."

== Film adaptation ==
The novel served as a basis for Kazan's 1969 film The Arrangement. It had to be cut to fit into 129 minutes and it used flashbacks heavily.
