= Ruby Sparks =

2012 film by Jonathan Dayton and Valerie Faris

- Theatrical release poster
- Directed by: Jonathan Dayton; Valerie Faris
- Written by: Zoe Kazan
- Produced by: Albert Berger; Ron Yerxa
- Starring: Paul Dano; Zoe Kazan; Antonio Banderas; Annette Bening; Steve Coogan; Elliott Gould; Chris Messina
- Cinematography: Matthew Libatique
- Edited by: Pamela Martin
- Music by: Nick Urata
- Production company: Bona Fide Productions
- Distributed by: Fox Searchlight Pictures
- Release date: July 25, 2012
- Running time: 104 minutes
- Country: United States
- Language: English
- Box office: $9.4 million

Ruby Sparks is a 2012 American romantic comedy film written by Zoe Kazan and directed by Jonathan Dayton and Valerie Faris. It stars Paul Dano as an anxious novelist whose fictional character, Ruby Sparks, played by Kazan, comes to life, and his struggles to reconcile his idealized vision of her with her increasing independence.

The film was released in the United States on July 25, 2012, by Fox Searchlight Pictures, and received positive reviews from critics.

== Plot ==
Calvin Weir-Fields is a novelist who found incredible success at an early age, but struggles to form relationships and to write his next book. His therapist tasks him to write about someone who likes his dog, Scotty. After a dream in which he meets a woman, Calvin is inspired to write about her, admitting that he is falling in love with his character, "Ruby Sparks". Calvin discovers a woman's belongings throughout his house, to the surprise of his brother Harry and sister-in-law Susie. Harry criticizes Calvin's writing about Ruby as overly idealized and unrealistic, but Calvin writes a passage about Ruby falling in love with him before falling asleep at his typewriter.

The next day, Calvin is stunned to find Ruby in his kitchen, a living person, who believes they are dating. He calls Harry, who does not believe him and advises him to find someone to confirm she is not real. Ruby insists on coming along as Calvin meets with Mabel, a fan of his book who gave him her number. Believing Calvin is cheating on her, Ruby confronts them, proving she is not a figment of his imagination. Calvin throws himself into their relationship, with Ruby unaware that he wrote her into existence. He introduces her to an incredulous Harry, demonstrating that his writing directly affects her, and asks Harry not to tell anyone of Ruby's origins, declaring that he will never write about her again.

Months later, Calvin reluctantly takes Ruby to meet his free-spirited mother Gertrude and her boyfriend Mort. While the outgoing Ruby enjoys herself, the introverted Calvin grows jealous of her time with other people, and her happiness fades with his increased gloominess. Returning home, their relationship becomes tense and a depressed Ruby explains how lonely she is, suggesting they spend less time together. Fearful of Ruby's desertion, Calvin writes that she is miserable without him and she returns, now incredibly clingy. Tiring of this, he writes that she is constantly happy, but he becomes morose, knowing her happiness is artificial.

Confiding in Harry, Calvin tries to write Ruby back to her original self, but his wording leaves her confused. They argue once more, and he attempts to cheer her up by taking her to a party hosted by his mentor, author Langdon Tharp. Leaving Ruby on her own, Calvin runs into his ex-girlfriend Lila, also a novelist, who accuses him of being uninterested in anyone outside of himself; Calvin deflects the blame and they part ways bitterly. Meanwhile, Langdon flirts with Ruby, eventually convincing her to join him in the pool in her underwear. A furious Calvin catches them in the act.

A fight ensues upon arriving home, with Ruby declaring that Calvin cannot control her. As she prepares to leave him, Calvin reveals that she is a product of his imagination and that he can make her do anything he writes. Ruby dismisses this until Calvin forces her to perform increasingly frenzied and humiliating acts as he writes on his typewriter. Afterward, Ruby locks herself away from Calvin. Ashamed of his actions, Calvin writes a final page stating that as soon as Ruby leaves the house, she is free and no longer his creation and subject to his will. He leaves the manuscript for her to read, including a note that says he loves her. The next morning, Calvin finds the note and Ruby gone.

Time passes and Calvin, miserable without Ruby, is unable to find the drive to write again. Harry suggests he write a new book about his experiences with Ruby. The novel, The Girlfriend, is a success, with the story moving several readers, including his family and therapist. While walking Scotty in the park, Calvin encounters a woman who resembles Ruby, reading his new book. When she notes that Calvin seems familiar, he responds by showing her his author's photo. The woman suggests that they start over, urging him not to tell her how the book ends. Calvin promises not to, and smiles.

== Cast ==
- Paul Dano as Calvin Weir-Fields, a young novelist who struggles with writer's block having not written a full book since his first publication at 19
- Zoe Kazan as Ruby Tiffany Sparks, a young woman who is initially a dream and inspires Calvin to write about her until she eventually manifests herself fully in his life
- Antonio Banderas as Mort, the carefree boyfriend of Calvin's mother. Banderas took on the role for the opportunity to work with Bening.
- Annette Bening as Gertrude, Calvin and Harry's mother
- Steve Coogan as Langdon Tharp, a novelist friend of Calvin whom he met when his first book was published
- Elliott Gould as Dr. Rosenthal, Calvin's therapist who encourages Calvin to write a page about anything not caring if it was bad
- Chris Messina as Harry Weir-Fields, Calvin's older brother in whom he confides about the true nature of Ruby
- Alia Shawkat as Mabel, a fan of Calvin's who gives him her phone number at a book signing
- Aasif Mandvi as Cyrus Modi, Calvin's publicist
- Toni Trucks as Susie Weir-Fields, Harry's wife
- Deborah Ann Woll as Lila, Calvin's ex-girlfriend who left him before the events of the film and has recently written her own book
- Wallace Langham as Warren
- Michael Berry Jr. as Silverlake passerby

Tom Perrotta and Michael Silverblatt make cameo appearances as themselves.

== Production ==
=== Writing ===
The film was written by Zoe Kazan, who plays the eponymous character. Kazan was initially inspired by a discarded mannequin and the myth of Pygmalion, quickly writing twenty pages, before putting the script aside for six months. She returned to the writing when she was clear on the central concept of comparing the idea of love to the actuality of it. During the writing, Kazan thought of Woody Allen's The Purple Rose of Cairo (1985) and Groundhog Day (1993), wanting to present a slanted version of our own reality. From early in the development, she wrote the lead character Calvin with her boyfriend Paul Dano in mind. On the feminist aspects of the story, Kazan explains she wanted to explore the idea of "being gazed at but never seen", where a woman is not properly understood but in a way that wasn't unkind or alienating for men. She rejects the description of Ruby Sparks as a Manic Pixie Dream Girl, calling it reductive and diminutive, whereas Ruby Sparks is about the danger of idealizing a person, of reducing a person down to an idea of a person.

Kazan thanks Warren Beatty for his indirect encouragement of Dano to develop their own material, and Dano in turn suggested she write a project.

=== Development ===
Kazan shopped the script around and got the attention of Albert Berger and Ron Yerxa, the producers of Little Miss Sunshine, who sent it to directing couple Jonathan Dayton and Valerie Faris, who took it on as the first project since Little Miss Sunshine in 2006. Faris blamed their delay between films on their own need to be ready for the right project.

=== Location ===
Kazan talked about the importance of Los Angeles as the location for the film, comparing it to a character as much as a setting. She sees Los Angeles as a place where it is easy to feel alone and isolated and that fits in with the isolation of Calvin in the story. Directors Dayton and Faris said it was great to show Los Angeles itself, rather than pretending to be another place.

Filming took place largely around the Silver Lake and Los Feliz neighborhoods. Other locations include Grauman's Egyptian Theatre, and the Hollywood Cemetery.

The party hosted by Langdon Tharp is held in the John Sowden House, designed by Lloyd Wright (son of Frank Lloyd Wright), located in Los Feliz.

== Music ==
The score was composed by DeVotchKa's Nick Urata. The soundtrack to the film was released on Milan Records.

No.	Title	Length
1.	"Creation"
2.	"Writer's Block"
3.	"Inspiration!"
4.	"Ruby Sparks"
5.	"I Was Waiting for You"
6.	"I'll Go with You"
7.	"She's Real"
8.	"Ça Plane Pour Moi" (Plastic Bertrand)
9.	"Une Fraction de Seconde" (Holden)
10.	"He Loved You"
11.	"Quand Tu Es La (The Game of Love)" (Sylvie Vartan)
12.	"Psychedelic Train" (Derrick Harriott)
13.	"Roll It Round" (The Lions)
14.	"Miserable"
15.	"Inseparable" (vocals by Timur Bekbosunov))
16.	"You're a Genius"
17.	"The Past Released Her"
18.	"She Came to Me"
19.	"Can We Start Over"
20.	"Ruby Was Just Ruby"

== Reception ==
=== Box office ===
Ruby Sparks opened in a limited release in 13 theaters and grossed $140,822, with an average of $10,832 per theater and ranking number 28 at the box office. The film's widest release in the U.S. was 261 theaters, and it ultimately earned $2.5 million in the U.S. and Canada, and $6.8 million internationally for a worldwide total of $9.4 million.

=== Critical response ===
On the review aggregator website Rotten Tomatoes, the film holds an approval rating of 79% based on 183 reviews, with an average rating of 7.2/10. The website's critics consensus reads, "Cleverly written and wonderfully acted, Ruby Sparks overcomes its occasional lags in pace with an abundance of charm and wit." On Metacritic, which assigns a weighted average score out of 100 to reviews from mainstream critics, the film received an average score of 67, based on reviews from 40 critics, indicating "generally favorable" reviews.

Stephen Holden from The New York Times wrote, "Ruby Sparks doesn't try to pretend to be more than it is: a sleek, beautifully written and acted romantic comedy that glides down to earth in a gently satisfying soft landing." Online film critic Chris Pandolfi from At a Theater Near You called it "an intelligent commentary on the creative process, insecurity, controlling behavior, idealism, and the fragility of the male ego. It's all rather ingeniously combined into one of the most likeable films I've seen all year – a fantasy, a character study, and a cautionary tale all rolled into one."
