= Nicholas Kazan =

American screenwriter

- Born: September 15, 1945 (age 81); New York City, U.S.
- Occupations: Screenwriter, producer, director
- Spouse: Robin Swicord (m. 1984)
- Children: Zoe Kazan; Maya Kazan
- Parent(s): Elia Kazan; Molly Kazan

Nicholas Kazan (/ˈkəˈzæn/; born September 15, 1945) is an American filmmaker.

== Early life ==
Kazan was born in New York, the son of Greek-American director Elia Kazan and his first wife, playwright Molly Kazan (née Thacher). His father was an Anatolian Greek. Through his mother, Kazan is a descendant of classicist and college administrator Thomas Anthony Thacher, Yale president Jeremiah Day, and founding father Roger Sherman.

== Career ==
Kazan, a noted playwright, premiered his play Mlle. God (2011) in Los Angeles with the Ensemble Studio Theatre-LA. A dark comedy, it reinvents Frank Wedekind's "Lulu" character. Kazan said he was inspired "most of all by Louise Brooks' luminous cosmic performance" of the character.

Kazan was nominated for the Academy Award for Best Adapted Screenplay and Golden Globe Award for Best Screenplay for his work on Reversal of Fortune.

== Personal life ==
Kazan graduated from Swarthmore College, with a major in English, in 1969. In 1984, Kazan married screenwriter Robin Swicord. Their daughters are actresses Zoe Kazan and Maya Kazan.

== Filmography ==
- Frances (1982) (with Christopher De Vore and Eric Bergren)
- At Close Range (1986)
- Patty Hearst (1988)
- Reversal of Fortune (1990)
- Mobsters (1991) (with Michael Mahem)
- Dream Lover (1993) (also Director)
- Matilda (1996) (with Robin Swicord)
- Homegrown (1998) (with Stephen Gyllenhaal)
- Fallen (1998)
- Bicentennial Man (1999)
- Enough (2002)
- The Whole Truth (2016)
