= Frances Kazan =

English-born American author

Frances Kazan (born 1946) is an English-born American author, best known for her 2002 historical novel Halide’s Gift.

== Biography ==
Born Frances Wright in Brighton, England. She has a B.A. in English literature and an M.A. in Turkish Studies from New York University. She is a longtime resident of New York City.

Kazan has been married twice: to Peter Rudge, former manager of The Rolling Stones and Lynyrd Skynyrd; and to the director and writer Elia Kazan, from 1981 until his death in 2003. She has two adult children, Joseph and Charlotte Rudge.

From 1997 to 2005, Kazan served as New York correspondent for Cornucopia, an English language magazine about Turkish culture.

Frances Kazan was instrumental in the 2009 Target Margin Theater production of Ten Blocks on the Camino Real, the one-act play by Tennessee Williams that Elia Kazan workshopped in 1949 at the Actors Studio; and The Really Big Once, a 2010 Target Margin Theater production about the creation of Tennessee Williams’s 1953 play Camino Real. Both productions were directed by Target Margin Theater founder David Herskovits. Sometimes described as a foray by Williams into the avant garde, Camino Real was the result of a collaboration between Williams and director Elia Kazan.

== Works ==
- Good Night, Little Sister (hardcover: Stein & Day, 1985; paperback: Collins UK, 1986) centers on a young woman who marries a rock star and becomes caught up in the world of rock ‘n’ roll.
- Halide’s Gift (hardcover: Random House, 2001; paperback, Random House, 2003) is a fictional account of the life of Halide Edib Adıvar, the Turkish novelist, feminist, and nationalist politician. Halide’s Gift has been translated into six languages.
- Halide Edip ve Amerika (Halide Edip and America), (Bağlam Yayınları, 1995; translated from the English by Bernar Kutlu), is a non-fiction book about the influence of American ideas and education on Halide Edib.
