= Molly Kazan =

American dramatist (1906–1963)

- Kazan during rehearsal for the stage production The Egghead in 1957
- Born: Molly Day Thacher; December 16, 1906; South Orange, New Jersey, U.S.
- Died: December 14, 1963 (aged 56); New York City, U.S.
- Occupations: Dramatist, playwright
- Spouse: Elia Kazan (m. 1932)
- Children: 4, including Nicholas Kazan
- Relatives: Zoe Kazan (granddaughter); Maya Kazan (granddaughter)

Molly Day Kazan (/kəˈzæn/ kə-ZAN; née Thacher; December 16, 1906 – December 14, 1963) was an American dramatist and the first wife of director Elia Kazan.

== Biography ==
Molly Day Thacher was born in South Orange, New Jersey, the daughter of Emma Cecelia (née Erkenbrecher) and Alfred Beaumont Thacher, a lawyer. Her grandparents were Elizabeth (Day) and Thomas Anthony Thacher, a classicist and college administrator. Her uncle, Thomas Thacher, was a lawyer.

Kazan graduated from Vassar College and attended the Yale Drama School for two years, where she met Elia Kazan. Molly was dating Elia's friend and roommate Alan Baxter at the time, until Molly left Baxter for Elia. Molly and Elia Kazan married in 1932.

Molly Day Kazan was the head of the playwriting division of Actors Studio for several years before resigning in May 1962.

In 1949, she wrote the book for a musical titled "Queen of Sheba". She wrote the play The Egghead in 1957, which ran for twenty-one performances on Broadway at the Ethel Barrymore Theatre. The play was directed by Hume Cronyn. She wrote the one-act plays Rosemary, and The Alligator in 1960.

Elia had numerous extramarital affairs which caused serious rifts with Molly, including with Constance Dowling and Marilyn Monroe. Elia has also been characterized as a narcissist, having written to Molly after admitting to the affair with Monroe, "If you divorce me, I'll tell you plainly I will in time get married again and have more children. I feel I'm a family man and I want a family, and am a damned good one. I dont care what your judgment is on that. I think I see the world around me (us) a hell of a lot more clearly than you do or anyone else does for that matter." Despite this, the couple stayed together, and Molly was very influential on his professional life.

She died on December 14, 1963, two days before her 57th birthday, in Bellevue Hospital in New York City following a cerebral hemorrhage. Her funeral was held at St. Clement's Protestant Episcopal Church with over 400 people in attendance. She was survived by her husband and four children, including the playwright Nicholas Kazan. Her granddaughters are the actresses Zoe and Maya Kazan.
