= The Arrangement (film) =

1969 film directed by Elia Kazan

- 1994 VHS cover
- Directed by: Elia Kazan
- Written by: Novel/screenplay: Elia Kazan
- Based on: The Arrangement; 1967 novel by Elia Kazan
- Produced by: Elia Kazan
- Starring: Kirk Douglas; Faye Dunaway; Deborah Kerr; Richard Boone; Hume Cronyn
- Cinematography: Robert Surtees
- Edited by: Stefan Arnsten
- Music by: David Amram
- Production company: Warner Bros.-Seven Arts
- Distributed by: Warner Bros.-Seven Arts
- Release date: November 18, 1969 (US)
- Running time: 125 minutes
- Country: United States
- Language: English
- Box office: $4 million (US/Canada rentals)

The Arrangement is a 1969 American drama film directed by Elia Kazan, based upon his 1967 novel of the same title.

It tells the story of Evangelos Topouzoglou, a successful Los Angeles-area advertising executive of Greek-American extraction who goes by the professional name "Eddie Anderson” (his second pseudonym). Eddie/Evangelos is portrayed by Kirk Douglas.

Eddie is suicidal and slowly having a psychotic breakdown. He is miserable at home in his marriage to his wife, Florence, played by Deborah Kerr, and with his career. He is engaged in a torrid affair with his mistress and co-worker Gwen (Faye Dunaway), and is forced to re-evaluate his life and its priorities while dealing with his willful and aging father (Richard Boone).

== Plot ==
Wealthy ad man Eddie Anderson attempts suicide by swerving his sportscar underneath a tractor trailer. Throughout the film, flashbacks—some memories, some hallucinations—reveal his contempt for his life and its "arrangements.” His contentious relationship with his Greek father, Sam Arness—a once-successful importer who despises Eddie for further Anglicizing his name, going to college and refusing to follow the family business—is made worse by Sam's accelerating brain damage from arteriosclerosis. Eddie's long marriage to Florence is now devoid of passion on his part and full of frustration on hers. Arthur, the family lawyer, advises her, to Eddie's disadvantage. Florence's psychoanalyst, Dr. Leibman, also weighs in. Eddie and Gwen, a research assistant at his advertising agency, have been lovers.

Eddie returns to work, where he insults a valued tobacco client by referring to “the big C”. He falls afoul of the police by buzzing L.A. in a small plane. Searching for his pilot's license, Florence finds nude photographs of Eddie and Gwen, just as Eddie learns that his father is in a New York City hospital.

In New York, Eddie's brother and sister-in-law want to place Sam in a nursing home, to ease the burden on their long-suffering mother, a burden made worse by Sam's violent paranoia and his insistence on starting a new business. Gwen is also in New York, living with Charles, who tells Eddie how devastated she was by their breakup. Gwen describes her own calculatedly promiscuous behavior to Eddie, behavior that Charles tolerates on the understanding that in the end, they will marry. She has a baby boy, Andy. She does not know who the father is.

Gwen and Eddie become lovers.

Florence follows Eddie to New York. She wants him to come home and work on the “reconstruction” of their marriage. She dismisses Eddie's desire to look after his father himself and explodes when he tells her he was with Gwen.

With the doctor's help, Eddie smuggles Sam out of the hospital to the family home, a huge Victorian mansion on Long Island Sound. Sam calls him Evangelos, stirring powerful memories. Gwen offers to be Eddie's mistress after she marries George, but Eddie insists that he is going to marry her.

Eddie cannot give Sam the money to start up his imaginary business, so decades of pent-up anger explode: Eddie admits he is ashamed of him. While Eddie and Gwen are out in a boat, the family removes Sam by force. Charles takes Gwen and the baby away.

Increasingly distracted, Eddie ultimately confronts the “successful” man that he was. Arthur interrupts this dialogue when he arrives from L.A. Arthur, Florence, and Dr. Liebman press Eddie to turn over all of his community property to Florence. She tells him not to sign, but he does, (using Arthur's name).

In a private conversation with Eddie, Florence confesses her love, She will “stick with him through anything.” But when Eddie says he wants to “do absolutely nothing” she replies “Fine. What will you do?” He wants to take time to think—which means selling their lavish holdings and living more simply. Florence simply cannot understand, and her jealousy of Gwen overwhelms her. Eddie accuses her—correctly—of talking to Arthur about committing him.

At the commitment hearing, we learn that Eddie subsequently set fire to the family home and we glimpse the alter egos at each other's throats. Eddie does not explain a gunshot wound: We see that Charles shot him in Gwen's apartment. Eddie asks to go to a psychiatric hospital. The judge tells Gwen that Eddie can release himself at any time by proving he has a job and a home.

Eddie seems to be content among his new friends at the asylum, but Gwen lures him out to try again. Eddie is reconciled to his dying father and tells Gwen that they both wanted the same thing—another chance. He tells her that he loves her. She thanks him and smiles. The final scene is at Sam's interment, where Florence gives Gwen a wry smile. The last shot is of Eddie smiling gently as his father's coffin is lowered into the grave.

== Cast ==
- Kirk Douglas as Eddie Anderson
- Faye Dunaway as Gwen
- Deborah Kerr as Florence
- Richard Boone as Sam
- Hume Cronyn as Arthur
- Harold Gould as Dr. Leibman
- Michael Murphy as Father Draddy
- Carol Rossen as Gloria
- John Randolph Jones as Charles
- Dianne Hull as Ellen Anderson
- Charles Drake as Finnegan
- Barry Sullivan as Chet Collier (uncredited)
- Steve Bond as Eddie (uncredited)

== Production ==
Kazan wanted Eddie to be portrayed by Marlon Brando, who Kazan felt could bring a greater depth to the role and bring it close to the character portrayed in the novel and who had experienced great success with Kazan previously in the films A Streetcar Named Desire, Viva Zapata!, and On the Waterfront. However, Brando refused to take the role, stating that he had no interest in making a film so soon after the assassination of Martin Luther King, Jr.

Production was shut down twice, with Douglas catching Hong Kong Flu three times.

== Reception ==
The film has a rating of 15% based on 13 reviews at Rotten Tomatoes.

Vincent Canby of The New York Times wrote that it "reeks with slightly absurd movie chic but, unlike Douglas Sirk's Written on the Wind or Vincente Minnelli's Two Weeks in Another Town, it's not only not much fun, but it's a mess of borrowed styles. What's worse is that it may be largely incomprehensible, on a simple narrative level, unless one has read Kazan's best-selling, 543-page short story that the director has more or less synopsized in his movie." Canby also included in his list of the newspaper's “ten worst films of 1969”: “Kazan uses a lot of snappy sixties’ cinematic techniques but the movie still looks like a gutsy Ross Hunter production from the fifties.” Variety called it "a confused, overly-contrived and overlength film peopled with a set of characters about whom the spectator couldn't care less."

Roger Ebert gave the film 2.5 stars out of 4 in a more mixed review, writing that it was "one of those long, ponderous, star-filled 'serious' films that were popular in the 1950s, before we began to value style more highly than the director's good intentions. It isn't successful, particularly not on Kazan's terms (he sees it, doubtless, as a bitter sermon on the consequences of selling out). But it does draw nourishment from the remarkable performances of Kirk Douglas and Faye Dunaway." Gene Siskel of the Chicago Tribune gave it 2 stars out of 4, writing that Kazan "fails to give us a clear characterization of Eddie or the people in his life. What tensions are revealed are clouded by basic directing errors ... It would be nice to excuse Kazan's direction by saying that he was forced to jazz up a weak script, but he wrote the script too."

Pauline Kael of The New Yorker wrote, "If one did not know that Kazan is a major figure in films, one would find nothing in the way this movie has been made to suggest it. The direction is tight and almost cruelly coercive of the actors. There's nothing in this movie that looks spontaneous, either in the direction or the acting. The actors have no life of their own as performers, no trace of invention; they're just shouting ciphers, acting out ready-made popular ideas about selling out." Charles Champlin of the Los Angeles Times wrote, "The personal passion which informed the novel is still present in the movie, but on the screen the passion is so compromised and weakened by what passes for technique and invention that it becomes only an intermittent echo." Tony Mastroianni in The Cleveland Press referred to the film as a "bad novel [that] didn't improve very much in the transfer [to film]. Philip Strick of The Monthly Film Bulletin wrote that the film "turns out to have said no more in 125 minutes than it stated during the first six."

== See also ==
- List of American films of 1969
