= The Jane Austen Book Club (film) =

2007 film by Robin Swicord

- Original poster
- Directed by: Robin Swicord
- Written by: Robin Swicord
- Based on: The Jane Austen Book Club by Karen Joy Fowler
- Produced by: John Calley; Julie Lynn; Diana Napper
- Starring: Maria Bello; Emily Blunt; Kathy Baker; Amy Brenneman; Maggie Grace; Hugh Dancy; Kevin Zegers; Marc Blucas; Jimmy Smits; Lynn Redgrave
- Cinematography: John Toon
- Edited by: Maryann Brandon
- Music by: Aaron Zigman
- Distributed by: Sony Pictures Classics
- Release date: September 21, 2007
- Running time: 106 minutes
- Country: United States
- Language: English
- Budget: $6 million
- Box office: $7.2 million

The Jane Austen Book Club is a 2007 American romantic drama film written and directed by Robin Swicord. The screenplay is adapted from the 2004 novel by Karen Joy Fowler.

The film focuses on a book club formed specifically to discuss the six novels written by Jane Austen. As they delve into Austen's literature, the book club members find themselves dealing with life experiences that parallel the themes of the books they are reading.

Released on October 5, 2007, in the United States, it was a moderate box office success, receiving mostly positive reviews.

== Plot ==
The Jane Austen Book Club is the brainchild of fiftysomething six-time divorcée Bernadette, who develops the idea when she meets Prudie, a prim, married high school French teacher in her mid-20s, at a Jane Austen film festival. The plan is to have six members discuss all six of Austen's novels (Pride and Prejudice, Sense and Sensibility, Emma, Persuasion, Mansfield Park, and Northanger Abbey), with each member hosting the group once a month.

Also inducted into the club are Sylvia, a librarian recently separated from her philandering lawyer husband Daniel after over two decades of marriage; her twentysomething lesbian daughter Allegra; Jocelyn, a happily unmarried control freak and breeder of Rhodesian Ridgebacks, and Sylvia's friend since childhood; and Grigg, a science fiction fan invited into the group by Jocelyn with the hope to match him with Sylvia.

As the months pass, each of the members develops characteristics similar to those of Austen's characters. So, they react to events in their lives similarly to their fictional counterparts.

Bernadette is the matriarchal figure who longs to see everyone find happiness. Sylvia clings to her belief in steadfast love and devotion (eventually reconciling with Daniel). Jocelyn denies her own feelings for Grigg while playing matchmaker for him and Sylvia. Prudie is encumbered with her inattentive husband Dean, and free-spirited, marijuana-smoking, aging hippie mother Mama Sky, who dies in a car accident.

Prudie also finds herself desperately trying to resist her feelings for seductive student Trey, meanwhile accusing Dean of coming on to her high-school acquaintance at Mama Sky's funeral. Allegra, who tends to meet her lovers while engaging in death-defying activities, feels betrayed because her partner, aspiring writer Corinne, uses Allegra's life as the basis for her short stories.

Grigg is attracted to Jocelyn and mystified by her seeming lack of interest in him, marked by her failure to read the Ursula Le Guin novels he hoped would interest her. He also serves as the comedic foil to Jocelyn's and Prudie's very serious takes on the books.

The last book club meeting is held on the beach. Daniel wants to join the book club after reading Persuasion with Allegra at the hospital after she has suffered a concussion from an indoor climbing accident. So, Sylvia lets Daniel into the book club.

Grigg brings his elder sister Cat Harris, who persuades Jocelyn to take a chance on him because he loves her. As a date, Allegra brings Dr. Yep, who treated her concussion. Prudie, the scheduled host, does not attend. Instead, she goes to meet Trey, but reconsiders after considering what Jane Austen would do. Prudie goes home to Dean and reads Persuasion with him, helping them rediscover their love. Daniel leaves a letter for Sylvia at her doorstep. Upon reading it, she accepts Daniel back.

Jocelyn finally reads the books Grigg gave to her and is surprised to find that she loves them, cannot sleep, so finishes them in a single night. She drives to his house, realises the very early time, and snoozes in her car. When Grigg exits his house, he sees Jocelyn's car and knocks on her window. Jocelyn finally gives in to her feelings and they kiss passionately.

One year later, the book club meets at Sylvia's library charity dinner. Grigg and Jocelyn are together, Sylvia and Daniel have reconciled, Prudie, who is pregnant, attends with Dean (who appears more enthusiastic about Austen), and Bernadette introduces her (seventh) husband.

== Cast ==
- Maria Bello as Jocelyn
- Emily Blunt as Prudie
- Kathy Baker as Bernadette
- Hugh Dancy as Grigg
- Amy Brenneman as Sylvia
- Maggie Grace as Allegra
- Jimmy Smits as Daniel
- Marc Blucas as Dean
- Lynn Redgrave as Mama Sky
- Kevin Zegers as Trey
- Nancy Travis as Cat Harris
- Parisa Fitz-Henley as Corinne
- Gwendoline Yeo as Dr. Samantha Yep
- Myndy Crist as Lynne

== Production ==
In The Book Club Deconstructed, a bonus feature on the DVD release of the film, screenwriter/director Robin Swicord explains how each of the six book club members is based on a character in one of Austen's novels. Bernadette represents Mrs. Gardiner in Pride and Prejudice, Sylvia is patterned after Fanny Price in Mansfield Park, Jocelyn reflects the title character in Emma, Prudie is similar to Anne Elliot in Persuasion, Allegra is most like Marianne in Sense and Sensibility, and Grigg represents all of Austen's misunderstood male characters.

Although the film is set in Sacramento, it was shot in Southern California. Filming locations included Encino, Lakewood, Long Beach, Los Angeles, North Hollywood, Northridge, Santa Clarita, Santa Monica, Van Nuys, and Westlake Village.

== Music ==
The soundtrack includes "New Shoes" by Paolo Nutini, "You're All I Have" by Snow Patrol, "Save Me" by Aimee Mann, "So Sorry" by Feist, and "Getting Some Fun Out of Life" by Madeleine Peyroux.

== Release ==
The film premiered at the Toronto International Film Festival before going into limited release in the US. It opened on 25 screens on September 21, 2007, and earned $148,549 on its opening weekend. It went into wide release on October 5, expanding to 1,232 screens and earning an additional $1,343,596 that weekend. It eventually grossed $3,575,227 in the US and $3,588,339 in international markets for a worldwide box office of $7,163,566.

== Critical reception ==
As of June 2020, the film holds a 66% approval rating on review aggregator website Rotten Tomatoes, based on 116 reviews with an average rating of 6.08/10. The website's critics consensus reads: "Though at times formulaic and sentimental, Jane Austen Book Club succeeds on the strength of its likable ensemble cast. Even those not familiar with Jane Austen's work may find much to enjoy this lighthearted romance." On Metacritic, the film has a weighted average score of 61 out of 100, based on 28 reviews.

Stephen Holden of The New York Times said the film "is such a well-acted, literate adaptation of Karen Joy Fowler's 2004 best seller that your impulse is to forgive it for being the formulaic, feel-good chick flick that it is ... Like the other movies and television projects in a Jane Austen boom that continues to gather momentum, it is an entertaining, carefully assembled piece of clockwork that imposes order on ever more complicated gender warfare."

Roger Ebert of the Chicago Sun-Times called the film "a celebration of reading" and added, "oddly enough that works ... I settled down with this movie as with a comfortable book. I expected no earth-shaking revelations and got none, and everything turned out about right, in a clockwork ending that reminded me of the precision the Victorians always used to tidy up their loose ends."

Ruthe Stein of the San Francisco Chronicle called the film "enjoyable if fairly predictable ... It's all a tad too neatly packaged, like a brand new set of Austen with the bindings unbroken. Still, a lively ensemble cast works hard ... Swicord's gift as a screenwriter is that her catch-up summaries avoid sounding pedantic or like CliffsNotes. She's less assured as a director. Her pacing is off, with some scenes going on longer than they need to and others whizzing by so fast you miss the nuances. Relationships aren't always as clear as they should be. Still, Austen devotees are sure to lap up the central premise that her notions of love and friendship are as relevant today as ever. And if The Jane Austen Book Club gets people thinking about forming a club of their own, it will have served a more admirable purpose than most movies."

Carina Chocano of the Los Angeles Times said it was nice to see "a movie so alive to the pleasures of reading and writing and sharing books, especially when the love feels sincere ... in parts, the story feels awkwardly truncated or too shallow to matter. But Swicord has a playful sense of humor and a good ear for dialogue, and the movie pleasantly accomplishes what it set out to accomplish."

Dennis Harvey of Variety stated, "While there are occasional forced notes ... Swicord's direction proves as accomplished as her script at handling an incident-packed story with ease, capturing humor and drama sans cheap laughs or tearjerking."

Claudia Puig of USA Today praised the film, noting: "This is Austen lite, but pleasantly so. You can hardly fault a movie that fashions itself around a consummate writer whose keen sense of humor and gift for fully realized characters have resulted in countless screen adaptations."
