= Zoe Kazan =

American actress (born 1983)

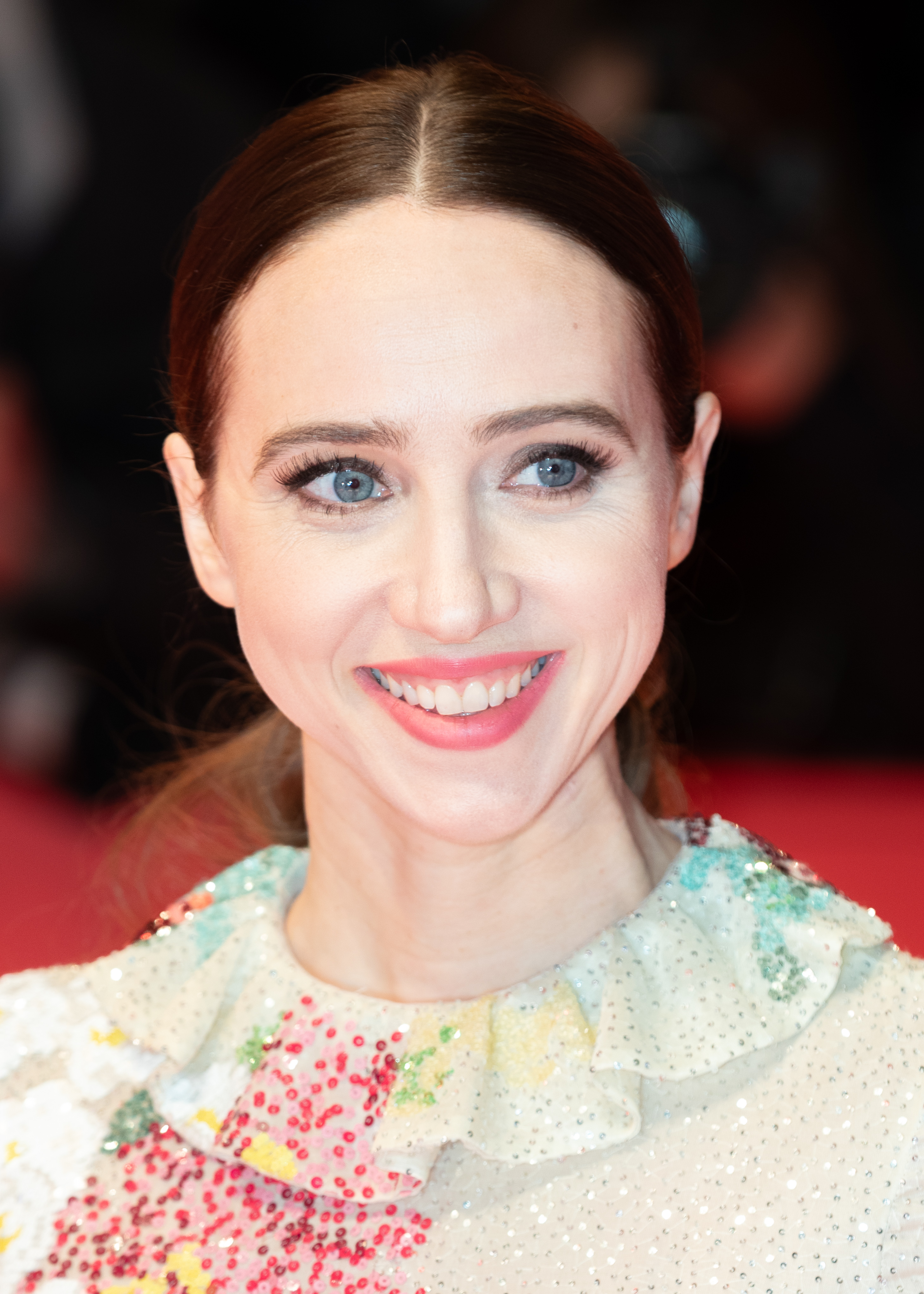
- Kazan in 2019
- Born: Zoe Swicord Kazan; September 9, 1983 (age 43); Los Angeles, California, U.S.
- Education: Yale University
- Occupations: Actress; screenwriter; playwright; writer
- Years active: 2003–present
- Partner: Paul Dano (2007–present)
- Children: 2
- Parents: Nicholas Kazan; Robin Swicord
- Relatives: Maya Kazan (sister); Elia Kazan (paternal grandfather); Molly Kazan (paternal grandmother)

Zoe Swicord Kazan (/kəˈzæn/ kə-ZAN; born September 9, 1983) is an American actress and writer. She has acted in films such as The Savages (2007), Revolutionary Road (2008), and It's Complicated (2009). She starred in Happythankyoumoreplease (2010), Meek's Cutoff (2010), Ruby Sparks (2012), What If (2013), The Big Sick (2017), The Ballad of Buster Scruggs (2018), and She Said (2022). She also wrote Ruby Sparks and co-wrote Wildlife (2018) with her partner Paul Dano.

Kazan made her Broadway debut in the revival of the William Inge play Come Back, Little Sheba (2008). She has since acted in a revival of Anton Chekov's The Seagull (2008), Martin McDonagh's A Behanding in Spokane (2010), and the revival of John Patrick Shanley's Doubt: A Parable (2024). Also a playwright, she wrote Absalom (2008), We Live Here (2011), Trudy and Max in Love (2014), and After the Blast (2017).

On television, she acted in the HBO miniseries Olive Kitteridge (2014), for which she was nominated for the Primetime Emmy Award for Outstanding Supporting Actress in a Limited Series or Movie. Her other television roles include in the HBO comedy series Bored to Death (2010), the HBO drama series The Deuce (2017–2019), the HBO miniseries The Plot Against America (2020), and the Netflix miniseries Clickbait (2021).

In 2026, Kazan's adaptation of the John Steinbeck novel East of Eden was released on Netflix, to positive reviews.

== Early life and education ==
Kazan was born in Los Angeles, the daughter of screenwriters Nicholas Kazan and Robin Swicord. Her paternal grandparents were film and theatre director Elia Kazan and playwright Molly Kazan (née Thacher). Elia was an Anatolian Greek emigrant from Constantinople, and Molly was a Mayflower descendant.

Kazan was educated at the private Wildwood School, Windward School, and at the Marlborough School in Hancock Park, Los Angeles. She attended Yale University, where she was a member of the Manuscript Society, and graduated in 2005 with a Bachelor of Arts in theatre.

== Career ==
=== 2003–2009: Early work and Broadway debut ===
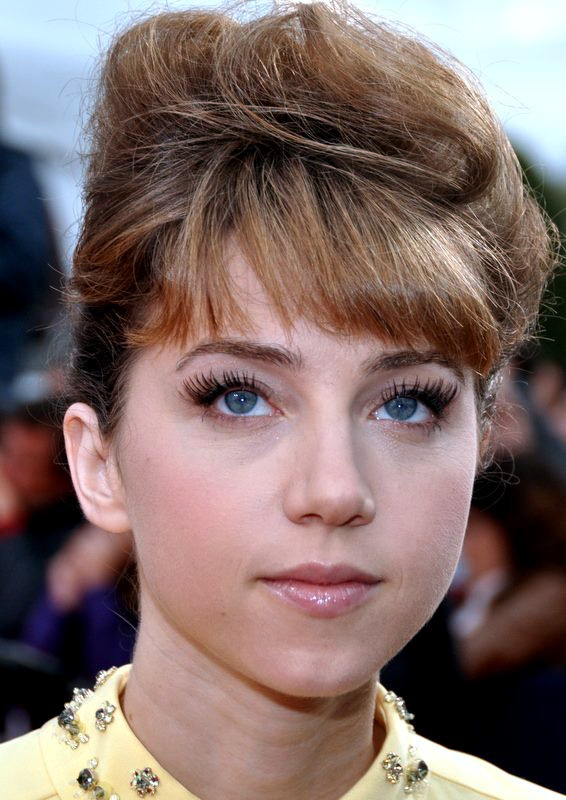
Kazan in 2012 at the Deauville American Film Festival

After her film debut in 2003 as Samantha in Swordswallowers and Thin Men, Kazan had her first professional stage role in the 2006 off-Broadway revival of The Prime of Miss Jean Brodie, starring Cynthia Nixon. In 2007, she had a small role in The Savages, starring Laura Linney and Philip Seymour Hoffman, and guest-appeared in an episode of Medium. She next appeared in the films Fracture and In the Valley of Elah. That fall, she returned to the stage in a The New Group production of 100 Saints You Should Know for which she received a Drama Desk Award for Outstanding Featured Actress in a Play nomination. That same year, she acted in Jonathan Marc Sherman's Things We Want alongside Paul Dano and Peter Dinklage directed by Ethan Hawke.

In January 2008, Kazan made her Broadway debut opposite S. Epatha Merkerson and Kevin Anderson in a revival of William Inge's Come Back, Little Sheba. Ben Brantley of The New York Times called her performance "first-rate", adding, "Ms. Kazan is terrific in conveying the character's self-consciousness." In the fall, she appeared on stage as Masha in a Broadway revival of Anton Chekhov's The Seagull (2008) opposite Kristin Scott Thomas, Carey Mulligan, and Peter Sarsgaard. That year she also had roles as Gal Employee in the drama August with Josh Hartnett, Gretta Adler in the period drama Me and Orson Welles with Zac Efron and Maureen Grube in the romantic drama Revolutionary Road starring Kate Winslet and Leonardo DiCaprio.

Kazan is also a playwright. In 2009, her play Absalom premiered at the Humana Festival of New American Plays in Louisville, Kentucky. The play, about a father's tense relationships with his children, had been extensively read and workshopped since Kazan's junior year at Yale. She ended the year playing Meryl Streep's daughter in the Nancy Meyers romantic comedy It's Complicated also starring Steve Martin and Alec Baldwin. She returned to Broadway acting in a production of Martin McDonagh's play A Behanding in Spokane with Christopher Walken and Sam Rockwell until June 6, 2010. She also had lead roles in the movies I Hate Valentine's Day and The Exploding Girl, both in 2009.

=== 2010–2016: Breakthrough and leading roles ===
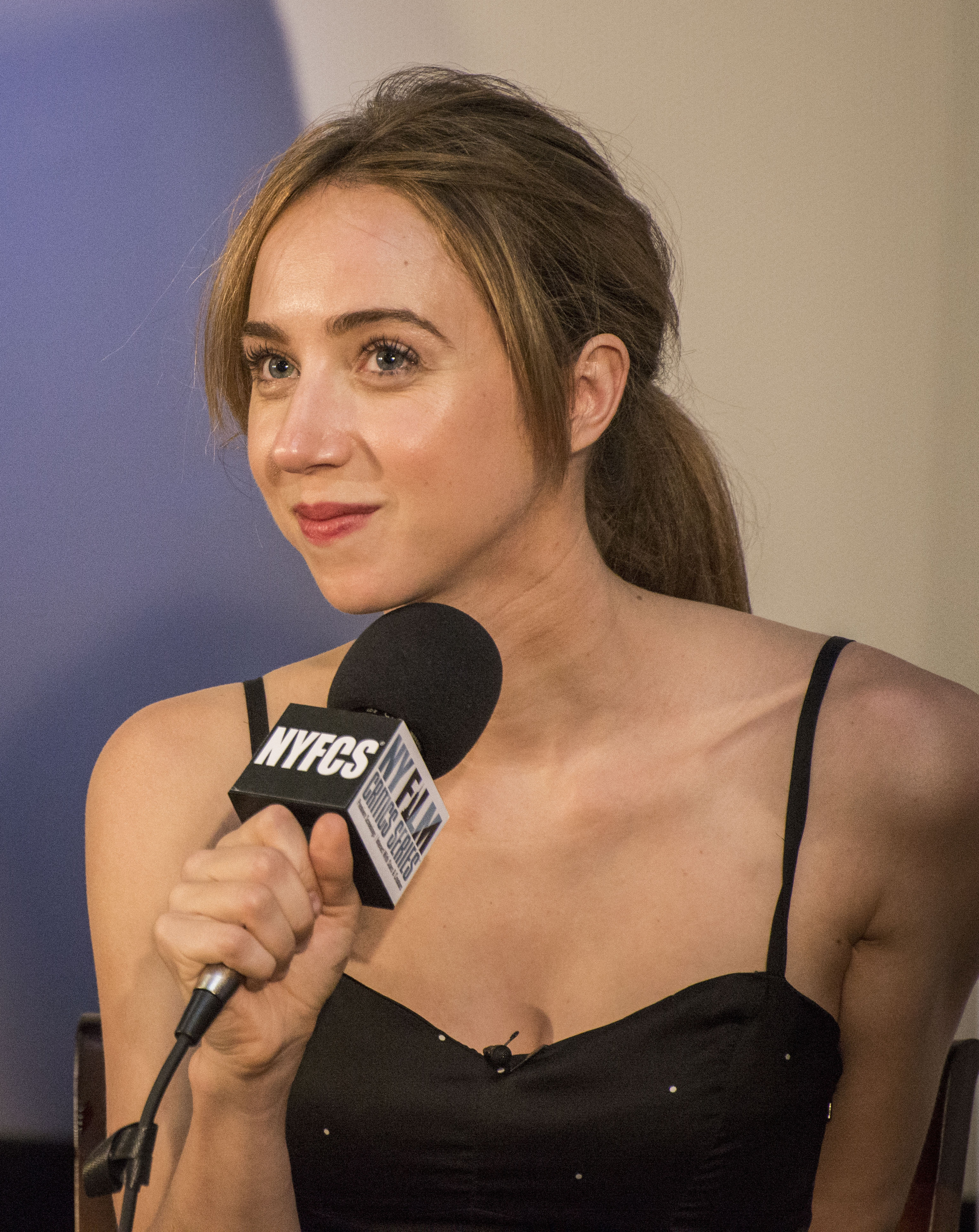
Kazan in 2014

In 2010, she had a main role in the comedy-drama Happy. Thank You. More. Please. as Mary Catherine, the cousin of Josh Radnor's character. She also starred as Millie Gately in Kelly Reichardt's independent Western drama Meek's Cutoff (2010) acting alongside Michelle Williams and Paul Dano. In the fall, Kazan played Harper Pitt in Signature Theatre Company's 20th-anniversary production of Tony Kushner's Angels in America. On the small screen, she appeared in four episodes of HBO's Bored to Death as Nina, the love interest of a fictionalized Jonathan Ames, played by Jason Schwartzman. Her play We Live Here, about a dysfunctional family, received its world premiere production from October 12 to November 6, 2011, at the off-Broadway Manhattan Theater Club in New York City. Among the ensemble cast was Amy Irving, and the director was 2010 Obie Award winner Sam Gold.

Kazan's starred in the title role of Ruby Sparks (2012), a comedy-romance film directed by Jonathan Dayton and Valerie Faris, and starring Kazan, Paul Dano, Chris Messina, Antonio Banderas, Annette Bening, Deborah Ann Woll and Steve Coogan. Kazan wrote the film and served as its executive producer. Eric Kohn of IndieWire praised the film declaring it a "startlingly insightful and whimsical romance". She received a nomination for the Independent Spirit Award for Best Screenplay. The following year she starred in the romantic comedy What If directed by Michael Dowse starring opposite Daniel Radcliffe. The film premiered at the 2013 Toronto International Film Festival under the title, The F Word. The Hollywood Reporter wrote of their pairing, "Kazan and Radcliffe don’t have physical chemistry so much as an innocent, cheerful alignment of personalities".

In 2014, her third play, Trudy and Max in Love, opened at the South Coast Repertory. Also in 2014, she starred in the HBO miniseries Olive Kitteridge acting alongside Frances McDormand, Richard Jenkins, and Bill Murray. The role earned her a nomination for the Primetime Emmy Award for Outstanding Supporting Actress in a Limited Series. In 2016, she received critical praise for her performance in the A24 horror film The Monster which was directed by Bryan Bertino.

=== 2017–present: Career expansion ===
In 2017, Kazan co-starred in independent romance drama film The Big Sick with Kumail Nanjiani, Holly Hunter, and Ray Romano. The film premiered at the Sundance Film Festival to positive reviews. The film went on to receive an Academy Award for Best Original Screenplay nomination. In 2018, she co-wrote the film Wildlife with her partner Paul Dano, who also directed. The film is based on the Richard Ford's 1990 novel of the same name. The film starred Carey Mulligan and Jake Gyllenhaal. That same year, Kazan starred in Joel and Ethan Coen's Western anthology film, The Ballad of Buster Scruggs, in the vignette "The Gal Who Got Rattled". Many critics considered her performance one of the film's highlights.

In 2020, Kazan starred in the limited series The Plot Against America as Elizabeth "Bess" Levin, a version of the mother of author Philip Roth, on whose book the show was based. It debuted on HBO, and also featured Winona Ryder, Anthony Boyle, and John Turturro. Kazan starred in Clickbait, a limited series for Netflix. The following year, she starred in the drama film She Said portraying journalist Jodi Kantor acting opposite Carey Mulligan as Megan Twohey. In 2024, she returned to Broadway acting in the revival of the John Patrick Shanley drama Doubt: A Parable acting opposite Amy Ryan and Liev Schreiber. In the play, Kazan portrays an innocent nun Sister James who suspects a priest of misconduct. Dalton Ross of Entertainment Weekly wrote of her performance, "Kazan deftly manages to convey Sister James' struggle between innocent naivety and the loss of inner light that comes with considering ugly possible truths". In October 2024, filming began on her adaptation of East of Eden.

== Personal life ==
Kazan has been in a relationship with actor Paul Dano since 2007. They have two children: a daughter born in August 2018 and a son born in October 2022.

== Acting credits ==
=== Film ===
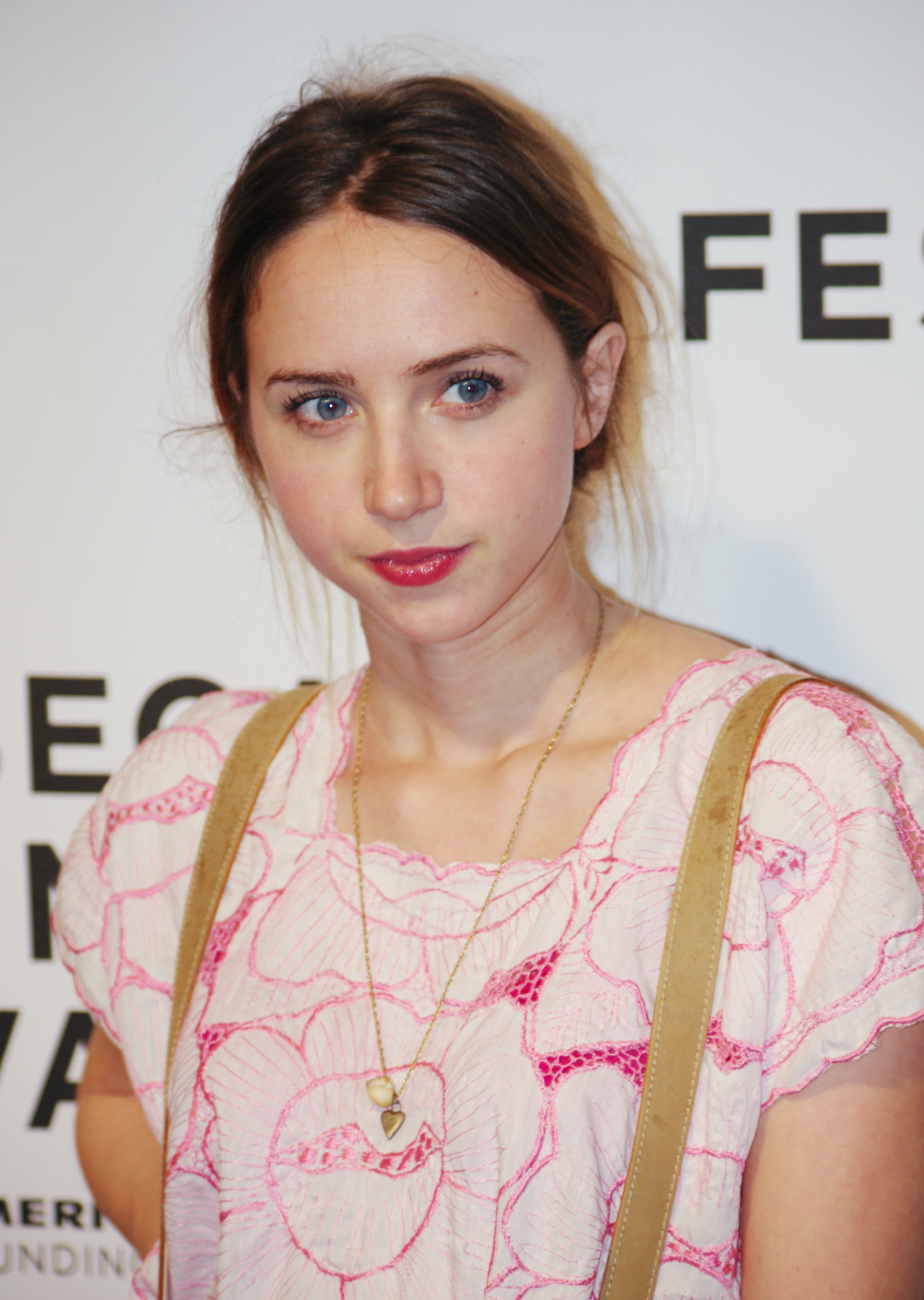
Kazan at the 2011 Tribeca Film Festival

Year	Title	Role	Notes
2003	Swordswallowers and Thin Men	Samantha	
2007	The Savages	Student	
2007	Fracture	Mona	
2007	In the Valley of Elah	Angie	
2008	August	Gal Employee	
2008	Me and Orson Welles	Gretta Adler	
2008	Revolutionary Road	Maureen Grube	
2009	The Exploding Girl	Ivy	
2009	The Private Lives of Pippa Lee	Grace Lee	
2009	I Hate Valentine's Day	Tammy Greenwood	
2009	It's Complicated	Gabby Adler	
2010	Happythankyoumoreplease	Mary Catherine	
2010	Meek's Cutoff	Millie Gately	
2012	Ruby Sparks	Ruby	Also writer and executive producer
2013	Some Girl(s)	Reggie	
2013	The Pretty One	Laurel/Audrey	
2013	The F Word (a.k.a. What If?)	Chantry	
2014	In Your Eyes	Rebecca Porter	
2015	Our Brand Is Crisis	LeBlanc	
2016	My Blind Brother	Francie	
2016	The Monster	Kathy	
2017	The Big Sick	Emily Gardner	
2018	Wildlife	—N/a	Co-writer and executive producer
2018	The Ballad of Buster Scruggs	Alice Longabaugh	Segment: "The Gal Who Got Rattled"
2019	The Kindness of Strangers	Clara	
2021	Cryptozoo	Magdalene	Voice
2022	She Said	Jodi Kantor	

=== Television ===
Year	Title	Role	Notes
2007	Medium	Izzy	Episode: "The Boy Next Door"
2008	Speechless	Stood Up Girl #2	Documentary
2008	After Iraq	Herself	Documentary
2010	Bored to Death	Nina	4 episodes
2011	Showing Up	Herself	Documentary
2014	Olive Kitteridge	Denise Thibodeau	2 episodes
2015	The Walker	Dotty	8 episodes
2017–19	The Deuce	Andrea Martino	8 episodes
2020	The Plot Against America	Elizabeth Levin	6 episodes
2021	Clickbait	Pia Brewer	8 episodes
2022	The Last Movie Stars	Jackie Witte (voice)	6 episodes
2026	East of Eden	Director	7 episodes, Writer and executive producer
TBA	Lonesome Dove	—N/a	Upcoming series, Writer and executive producer

=== Theatre ===
Year	Title	Role	Playwright	Venue	Ref.
2006	The Prime of Miss Jean Brodie	Sandy	Muriel Spark	Acorn Theatre, Off-Broadway	
2007	100 Saints You Should Know	Abby	Kate Fodor	Playwrights Horizons, Off-Broadway	
2007	Things We Want	Stella	Jonathan Marc Sherman	Acorn Theatre, Off-Broadway	
2008	Come Back, Little Sheba	Marie	William Inge	Biltmore Theatre, Broadway	
2008	The Seagull	Masha	Anton Chekov	Walter Kerr Theatre, Broadway	
2009	Absalom	—N/a	Zoe Kazan	Actors Theatre of Louisville	
2010	A Behanding in Spokane	Marilyn	Martin McDonagh	Gerald Schoenfeld Theatre, Broadway	
2010	Angels in America	Harper Pitt	Tony Kushner	Signature Theatre, Off-Broadway	
2011	We Live Here	—N/a	Zoe Kazan	Manhattan Theater Club	
2013	Clive	Joanne	Jonathan Marc Sherman	Acorn Theatre, Off-Broadway	
2014	Trudy and Max in Love	—N/a	Zoe Kazan	South Coast Repertory	
2014	When We Were Young and Unafraid	Mary Anne	Sarah Treem	Manhattan Theater Club, Off-Broadway	
2016	Love Love Love	Rose	Mike Bartlett	Roundabout Theatre, Off-Broadway	
2017	After the Blast	—N/a	Zoe Kazan	Lincoln Center Theatre	
2024	Doubt: A Parable	Sister James	John Patrick Shanley	Todd Haimes Theatre, Broadway	

== Awards and nominations ==
Year	Association	Category	Work	Result	Ref.
2008	Drama Desk Award	Outstanding Featured Actress in a Play	The Seagull	Nominated	
2009	Drama Desk Award	Outstanding Featured Actress in a Play	100 Saints You Should Know	Nominated	
2009	National Board of Review	Best Cast	It's Complicated	Won	
2012	Detroit Film Critics Society	Breakthrough Performance	Ruby Sparks	Won	
2012	Saturn Awards	Best Actress	Ruby Sparks	Nominated	
2012	Independent Spirit Awards	Best Screenplay	Ruby Sparks	Nominated	
2015	Primetime Emmy Awards	Outstanding Supporting Actress in a Limited Series or Movie	Olive Kitteridge	Nominated	
2015	Satellite Awards	Best Supporting Actress – Series, Miniseries or Television Film	Olive Kitteridge	Nominated	
2017	Critics' Choice Movie Awards	Best Actress in a Comedy	The Big Sick	Nominated	
2017	Screen Actors Guild	Outstanding Performance by a Cast in a Motion Picture	The Big Sick	Nominated	
