= The Jane Austen Book Club =

2004 novel

- First edition cover
- Author: Karen Joy Fowler
- Language: English
- Publisher: Putnam Adult
- Publication date: April 22, 2004
- Publication place: United States
- Media type: Print (hardback & paperback)
- Pages: 288pp
- ISBN: 0-399-15161-3
- OCLC: 52574555
- Dewey Decimal: 813/.54 22
- LC Class: PS3556.O844 J36 2004

The Jane Austen Book Club is a 2004 novel by American author Karen Joy Fowler. The story, which takes place near Sacramento, California, centers around a book club consisting of five women and one man who meet once a month to discuss Jane Austen's six novels (Pride and Prejudice, Sense and Sensibility, Emma, Persuasion, Mansfield Park, and Northanger Abbey). The novel was a critical success and became a national bestseller.

A film adaptation of the same name was released in autumn of 2007 starring Emily Blunt, Kathy Baker, Amy Brenneman, Jimmy Smits, Hugh Dancy, Maggie Grace, and Maria Bello.

== Plot introduction ==
The novel takes place over the course of several months in Davis, California, a university town in California's Central Valley near Sacramento. Each of the six chapters is dedicated to one of the six book club members as well as one of Austen's six works. In turn, each of Austen's novels parallels the individual character's lived experiences with their relationships, family, and love.

== Characters and their corresponding novels ==
- Jocelyn (Emma): a Rhodesian Ridgeback breeder and matchmaker who organized the Jane Austen Book Club. Jocelyn has been best friends with Sylvia since they were eleven and introduced her to her husband, Daniel, when they were in high school. Now in her fifties, she has never married and has no children. She originally invites Grigg to the book club for Sylvia's sake, but ends up attracted to him herself.
- Allegra (Sense and Sensibility): the young and impetuous 30-year-old daughter of Sylvia and her husband Daniel. Allegra is an artist and a thrillseeker who enjoys activities such as rock climbing and skydiving. Allegra is separated from her partner, Corinne, and lives with Sylvia.
- Prudie (Mansfield Park): a 28-year-old French teacher at a local high school. She is married to Dean, whom she loves, but she becomes confused when witnessing everyday infatuations between her students, especially when one student in particular flirts with her.
- Grigg (Northanger Abbey): an offbeat 40-something, and the only male member of the book club. Grigg grew up the only boy among his three older sisters. He met Jocelyn outside a science fiction convention as she came to attend a nearby dog breeding convention.
- Bernadette (Pride and Prejudice): a talkative, 67-year-old yoga enthusiast. She has been married multiple times and is the most satisfied with her lifestyle.
- Sylvia (Persuasion): Jocelyn's best friend. Sylvia is in her fifties and is separating from her husband.

== Reception ==
The book was on The New York Times Best Seller list for thirteen weeks. The novel was also recommended as the sixth best book of 2005 on the television show Richard & Judy.

Vulture positively reviewed the book in 2019, noting "what makes this novel worth reading now — especially in light of ever-changing ideas on gender — is how it addresses what men are and aren’t 'supposed' to read: Can real men read Jane?"

== Film adaptation ==
A film adaptation of the book, written and directed by Robin Swicord, was released in the United States in the fall of 2007. While the character names and some minor details remained the same, the screenplay is for the most part a dramatic departure from the novel. The film stars Maria Bello as Jocelyn, Emily Blunt as Prudie, Kathy Baker as Bernadette, Amy Brenneman as Sylvia, Maggie Grace as Allegra, and Hugh Dancy as Grigg.
