= Maya Kazan =

American actress

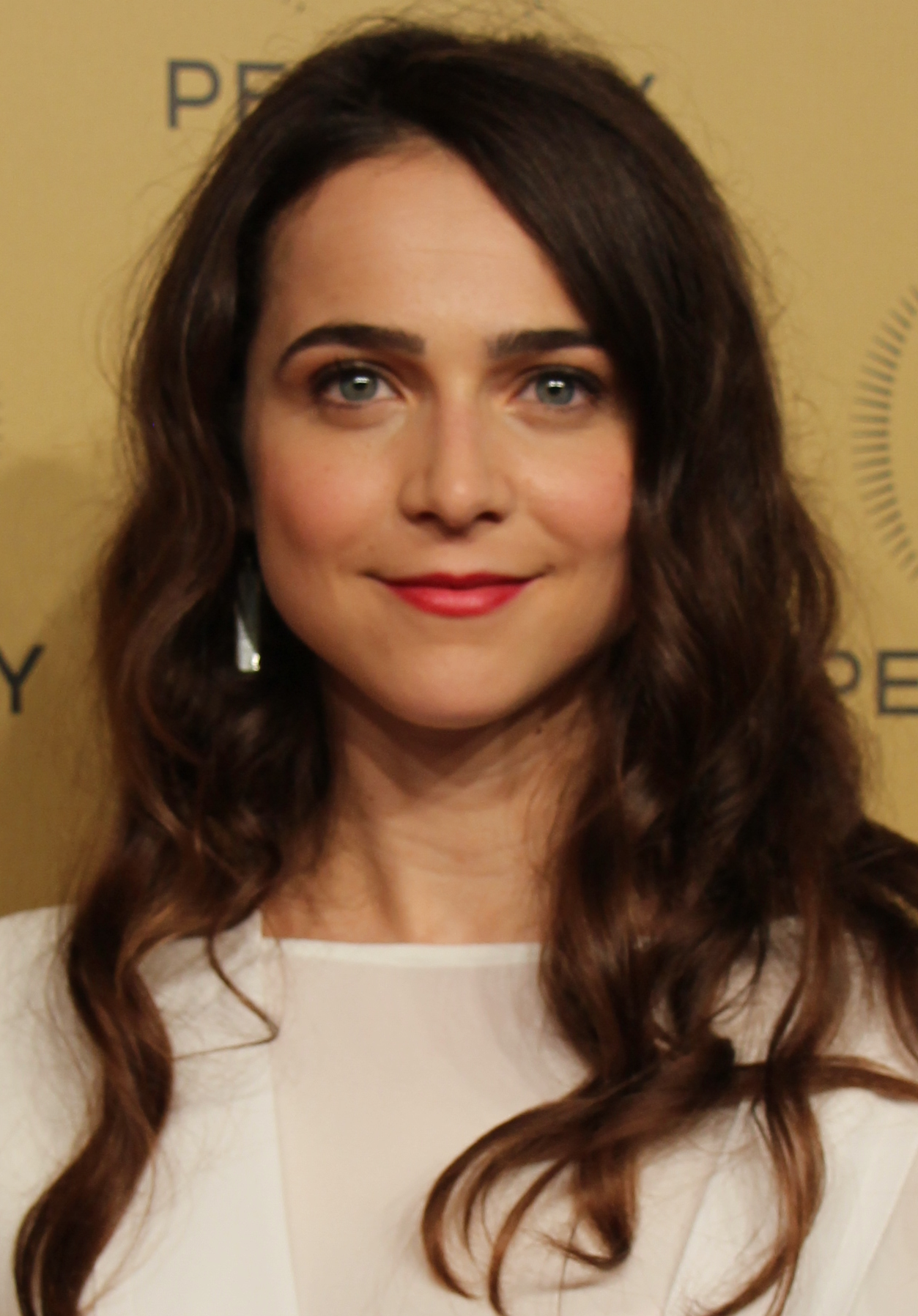
- Kazan in 2015
- Born: November 24, 1986 (age 39); Los Angeles, California, U.S.
- Education: Wesleyan University
- Occupation: Actress
- Years active: 2008–present
- Spouse: Ted Feldman (m. 2018)
- Children: 1
- Parent(s): Nicholas Kazan; Robin Swicord
- Relatives: Zoe Kazan (sister); Elia Kazan (paternal grandfather); Molly Kazan (paternal grandmother)

Maya Kazan (/ˈkəˈzæn/; born November 24, 1986) is an American actress. She is best known for her role as Eleanor Gallinger on the television series The Knick (2014–2015).

== Early life ==
Maya Kazan was born on November 24, 1986 in Los Angeles, California. She is the daughter of screenwriters Nicholas Kazan and Robin Swicord, and the granddaughter of film director Elia Kazan and playwright Molly Kazan. Her sister is actress Zoe Kazan. Her father's side of the family is Greek.

== Career ==
=== Theater ===
In 2012, Kazan starred as Lucrece in Pierre Corneille's The Liar, written by David Ives at the Shakespeare Theatre of New Jersey.

In 2013, she played the role of Laura in Michael Rabe's play The Future Is Not What It Was at the Walkerspace theater in New York.

In 2014, she took on the role of the adult Perdita in William Shakespeare's The Winter's Tale at the Old Globe Theater. In a February 2014 Los Angeles Times review, critic Charles McNulty wrote: "Kazan doesn't yet possess a strong stage voice, but she has everything else that's needed to make us fall in love with Perdita — natural radiance, unassuming intelligence and gentleness."

=== Television ===
In 2014, Kazan landed a recurring role as Eleanor Gallinger in Steven Soderbergh's The Knick on Cinemax alongside co-stars Clive Owen, Eve Hewson and Grainger Hines. That same year, she landed another recurring role on HBO's Boardwalk Empire playing Mabel Thompson, the wife of a young Nucky Thompson, in a string of flashbacks throughout the series' fifth and final season.

== Filmography ==
Film
Year	Title	Role	Notes
2008	Christie Mae	Christie Mae	short film
2008	Lenore	Lenore	short film
2009	I'll Never Smile Again	Amy	short film
2011	Love Is Like Life But Longer	Young nun	short film
2011	Three Things		short film
2012	Trial by Combat	Emily	short film
2012	Every Saturday	Hannah	
2012	Where the Sharpest Knife was Kept	Carla	short film
2012	Frances Ha	Caroline	
2013	Blood Moon	Manya	
2015	Prism	Jewels	
2018	The Unicorn	Katie	
2019	Plus One	Shaina	
2020	Love Is Love Is Love	Caroline	
2020	Useless Humans	Wendy	
2021	The Little Things	Rhonda Rathbun	
2021	Alia's Birth	Jenna	
2024	Junk	Stella	

Television
Year	Title	Role	Notes
2013	Company Town	Marla	TV film
2014	Boardwalk Empire	Mabel Jeffries-Thompson	4 episodes
2014–15	The Knick	Eleanor Gallinger	13 episodes
2015–16	Sleepy Hollow	Zoe Corinth	Recurring (Season 3)
2017	Jane the Virgin	Chloe	Recurring (Season 3)
2017	Z: The Beginning of Everything	Livye Hart	Recurring (Season 1)
2018	Mosaic	Laura Hurley	8 episodes
2018	Imposters	Deputy Kim Bullock	Episode: "Fillion Bollar King"
2020	Homecoming	Kaya	Episode: "Previously"
2020	Utopia	Olivia	Episode: "Life Begins"
2021	Miracle Workers	Pregnant Ruth	Episode: "Fording the River"
2021	Love Life	Emily Hexton	Season 2
