= Elia Kazan =

Greek-American theatre director and filmmaker (1909–2003)

- Ηλίας Καζαντζόγλου
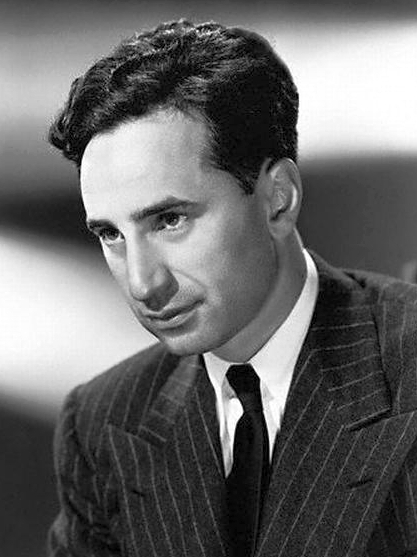
- Kazan c. 1950
- Born: Elias Kazantzoglou; September 7, 1909; Constantinople, Ottoman Empire (now Istanbul, Turkey)
- Died: September 28, 2003 (aged 94); Manhattan, New York City, U.S.
- Education: Williams College (BA); Yale University; Juilliard School
- Occupations: Director; producer; screenwriter; actor
- Years active: 1934–1976
- Spouses: Molly Day Thacher (m. 1932; died 1963); Barbara Loden (m. 1967; died 1980); Frances Rudge (m. 1982)
- Children: 5, including Nicholas
- Relatives: Zoe Kazan (granddaughter); Maya Kazan (granddaughter)

Signature
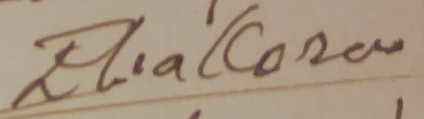

Elias Kazantzoglou (Greek: Ηλίας Καζαντζόγλου, IPA: [iˈli.as kazanˈdzoɣlu]; September 7, 1909 – September 28, 2003), known as Elia Kazan (/ˈiːliə kəˈzæn/ EE-lee-ə kə-ZAN), (Note: Later in his life, he was known in Greece as Ελία Καζάν [eˈli.a kaˈzan]—a transcription of his English name.) was a Greek-American film and theatre director, producer, screenwriter and actor, described by The New York Times as "one of the most honored and influential directors in Broadway and Hollywood history".

Born in Constantinople (now Istanbul) to Cappadocian Greek parents, his family went to the United States in 1913. After attending Williams College and then the Yale School of Drama, he acted professionally for eight years, later joining the Group Theatre in 1932, and co-founded the Actors Studio in 1947. With Robert Lewis and Cheryl Crawford, his actors' studio introduced "Method Acting" under the direction of Lee Strasberg. Kazan acted in a few films, including City for Conquest.

His films focused on personal or social issues that particularly concerned him. Kazan writes, "I don't move unless I have some empathy with the basic theme." His first such "issue" film was Gentleman's Agreement, with Gregory Peck, which dealt with antisemitism in the United States. It received eight Oscar nominations and three wins, including Kazan's first for Best Director. It was followed by Pinky, one of the first films in mainstream Hollywood to address racial prejudice against African Americans. A Streetcar Named Desire, an adaptation of the stage play which he had also directed, received twelve Oscar nominations, winning four, and was Marlon Brando's breakthrough role. Three years later, he directed Brando again in On the Waterfront, a film about union corruption on New York's waterfront. It also received twelve Oscar nominations, winning eight. In 1955, he directed John Steinbeck's East of Eden, starring James Dean.

A turning point in Kazan's career came with his testimony as a "friendly witness" before the House Un-American Activities Committee (HUAC) in 1952 at the height of the Hollywood blacklist. His decision to cooperate and name names brought him strong negative reactions from many friends and associates. His harshly anti-communist testimony "damaged if not shattered the careers of his former colleagues, Morris Carnovsky and Art Smith, both actors, and the playwright Clifford Odets". In his memoirs, Kazan writes that he and Odets had made a pact at the time to name each other in front of the committee. Kazan later justified his actions by saying he took "only the more tolerable of two alternatives that were either way painful and wrong". Nearly a half-century later, his 1952 HUAC testimony continued to cause controversy. When Kazan was awarded an honorary Oscar in 1999, dozens of actors chose not to applaud as 250 demonstrators picketed the event.

Kazan influenced the films of the 1950s and 1960s with his provocative, issue-driven subjects. Director Stanley Kubrick called him "without question, the best director we have in America, [and] capable of performing miracles with the actors he uses". Film author Ian Freer concludes that even "if his achievements are tainted by political controversy, the debt Hollywood—and actors everywhere—owes him is enormous". Orson Welles said "Kazan is a traitor ... [but] he is a very good director". In 2010, Martin Scorsese co-directed the documentary film A Letter to Elia as a personal tribute to Kazan.

== Early life ==
Elia Kazan was born as Elias Kazantzoglou on September 7, 1909, in the Chalcedon (now Kadıköy) district of Constantinople (now Istanbul), to Cappadocian Greek parents, Athena (née Shishmanoglou) and George Kazantzoglou, who were originally from Kayseri in Anatolia. Elia was named after his paternal grandfather, Elias Kazantzoglou; his maternal grandfather was Isaak Shishmanoglou. The family's surname comes from the Turkish Kazancı (Ottoman Turkish: قزانجی), meaning "pot maker", and oğlu, a patronymic meaning "son [of]". Family members emigrated to the United States, where Elias and his mother arrived on July 8, 1913.

Kazan was raised in the Greek Orthodox Church and attended Greek Orthodox services every Sunday, where he had to stand for several hours with his father. His mother read the Bible but did not go to church. When Kazan was about eight years old, the family moved to New Rochelle, New York, and his father sent him to a Catholic catechism school because there was no Orthodox church nearby. When meeting with the Turkish filmmaker Yılmaz Güney, it was revealed he had retained fluency in the Turkish language from childhood.

As a young boy, he was remembered as being shy, and his college classmates characterized him as more of a loner. Much of his early life was portrayed in his autobiographical book, America America, which he made into a 1963 film. In it, he describes his family as "alienated" from both their parents' Greek Orthodox values and from those of "mainstream America". His mother's family were cotton merchants who imported cotton from England and sold it wholesale. His father had become a rug merchant after immigrating to the US, and he expected his son to take over the family business someday.

After attending public schools through high school, Kazan enrolled at Williams College in Massachusetts, where he helped pay his way by waiting tables and washing dishes; he still graduated cum laude. He also worked as a bartender at various fraternities but never joined one. While a student at Williams, he earned the nickname "Gadg" (for Gadget) because, he said, "I was small, compact, and handy to have around." The nickname was eventually taken up by his stage and film stars.

In America America, Kazan recounts how and why his family left Turkey for the United States. Kazan observes that much of it came from stories that he heard as a young boy. He says during an interview that "it's all true: the wealth of the family was put on the back of a donkey, and my uncle, really still a boy, went to Istanbul ... to gradually bring the family there to escape the oppressive circumstances. ... It's also true that he lost the money on the way, and when he got there he swept rugs in a little store."

Kazan noted some of the controversial aspects of what he put in the film: "I used to say to myself when I was making the film that America was a dream of total freedom in all areas." To make his point, the character who portrays Kazan's uncle Avraam kisses the ground when he gets through customs, while the Statue of Liberty and the American flag are in the background. Kazan had considered whether that kind of scene might be too much for American audiences:

I hesitated about that for a long time. A lot of people, who don't understand how desperate people can get, advised me to cut it. When I am accused of being excessive by the critics, they're talking about moments like that. But I wouldn't take it out for the world. It actually happened. Believe me, if a Turk could get out of Turkey and come here, even now, he would kiss the ground. To oppressed people, America is still a dream.

Before undertaking America America, Kazan wanted to confirm many of the details about his family's background. At one point, he sat his parents down and recorded their answers to his questions. He remembers eventually asking his father a "deeper question: 'Why America? What were you hoping for?'" His mother gave him the answer: "A.E. brought us here." Kazan states that "'A.E.' was my uncle Avraam Elia, the one who left the Anatolian village with the donkey. At twenty-eight, somehow—this was the wonder—he made his way to New York. He sent home money and in time brought my father over. Father sent for my mother and my baby brother and me when I was four." (Elia's brother, Avraam, was born in Berlin and later became a psychiatrist.) Kazan writes of America America, "It's my favorite of all the films I've made, the first film that was entirely mine."

== Career ==
=== 1930s: Stage career ===
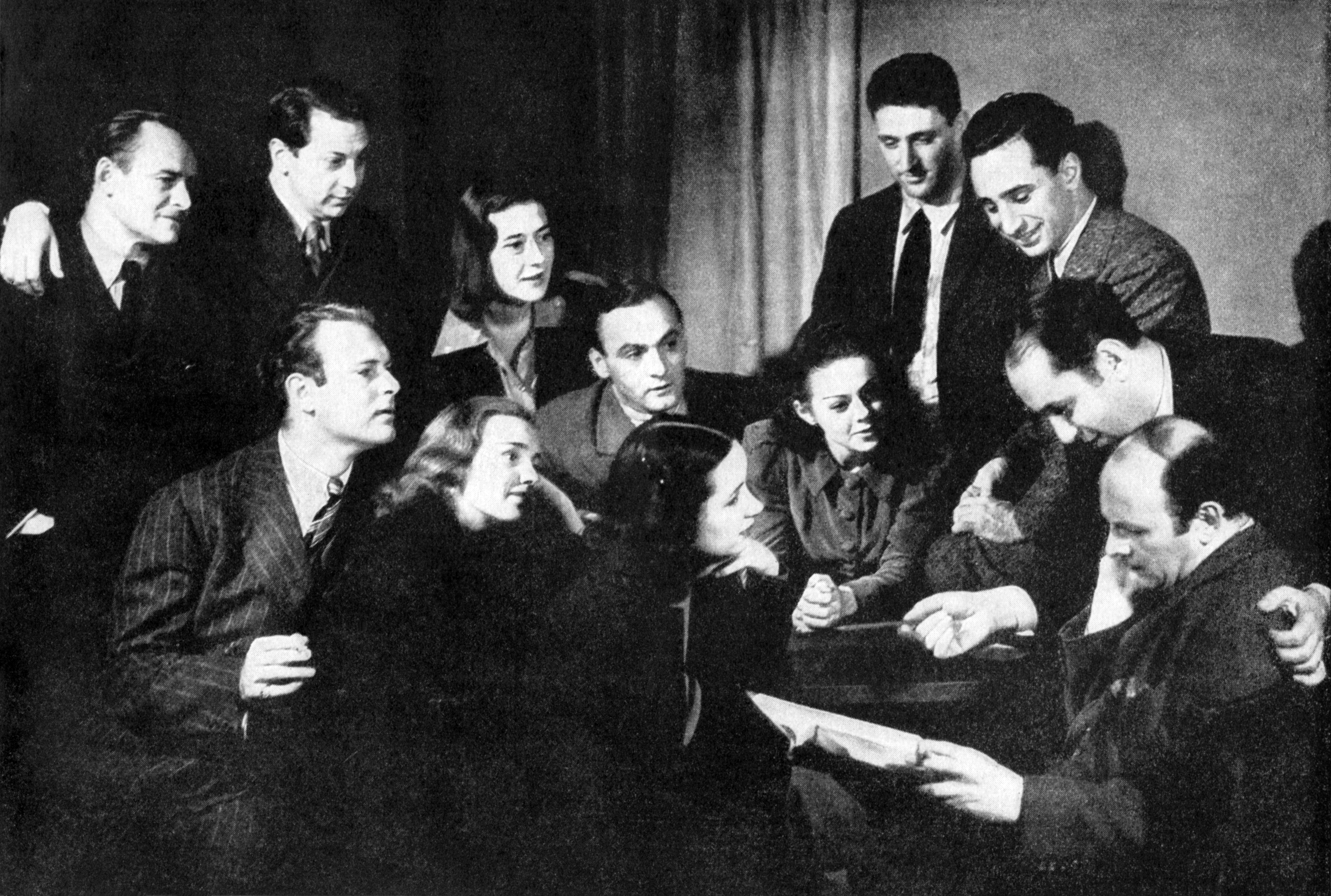
Kazan (back row, right) with other members of the Group Theatre in 1938

In 1932, after spending two years at the Yale University School of Drama, he moved to New York City to become a professional stage actor. He continued his professional studies at the Juilliard School, where he studied singing with Lucia Dunham. His first opportunity came with a small group of actors engaged in presenting plays containing "social commentary". They were called the Group Theatre, which showcased many lesser-known plays with deep social or political messages. After struggling to be accepted by them, he discovered his first strong sense of self in America within the "family of the Group Theatre, and more loosely in the radical social and cultural movements of the time", writes film author Joanna E. Rapf.

In his autobiography, Kazan writes of the "lasting impact on him of the Group", noting in particular Lee Strasberg and Harold Clurman as "father figures", along with his close friendship with playwright Clifford Odets. During an interview with Michel Ciment, Kazan described the Group:

The Group was the best thing professionally that ever happened to me. I met two wonderful men. Lee Strasberg and Harold Clurman, both of whom were around thirty years old. They were magnetic, fearless leaders. During the summer I was an apprentice, they were entertaining in a Jewish summer camp. ... At the end of the summer they said to me: "You may have talent for something, but it's certainly not acting."

Kazan also praised Strasberg as a vital leader of the Group:

He carried with him the aura of a prophet, a magician, a witch doctor, a psychoanalyst, and a feared father of a Jewish home. ... [H]e was the force that held the thirty-odd members of the theatre together, and made them permanent.

Kazan's first national success came as a New York theatrical director. Although initially he worked as an actor on stage, and told early in his acting career that he had no acting ability, he surprised many critics by becoming one of the Group's most capable actors. In 1935 he played the role of a strike-leading taxi driver in a drama by Clifford Odets, Waiting for Lefty, and his performance was called "dynamic", leading some to label him the "proletarian thunderbolt". Among the themes that would run through all of his work were "personal alienation and an outrage over social injustice", writes film critic William Baer. Other critics have likewise noted his "strong commitment to the social and social psychological—rather than the purely political—implications of drama".

By the mid-1930s, when he was 26, Kazan began directing a number of the Group Theatre's plays, including Robert Ardrey's well-known play Thunder Rock. In 1942, he achieved his first notable success by directing a play by Thornton Wilder, The Skin of Our Teeth, starring Tallulah Bankhead and Fredric March. The play, though controversial, was a critical and commercial success and won Wilder a Pulitzer Prize. Kazan won the New York Drama Critics Award for Best Director and Bankhead for Best Actress. Kazan then went on to direct Death of a Salesman by Arthur Miller, and then directed A Streetcar Named Desire by Tennessee Williams, both of which were also successful. Kazan's wife, Molly Thacher, the reader for the Group, discovered Williams and awarded him a "prize that launched his career".

The Group Theatre's summer rehearsal headquarters was at Pine Brook Country Club, located in the countryside of Nichols, Connecticut, during the 1930s and early 1940s. Along with Kazan were numerous other artists, including Harry Morgan, John Garfield, Luise Rainer, Frances Farmer, Will Geer, Howard da Silva, Clifford Odets, Lee J. Cobb, and Irwin Shaw.

=== 1940s: The Actors Studio, early films ===
In 1940, Kazan had a large supporting role as a flamboyantly dressed gangster in the boxing thriller City for Conquest starring James Cagney, Ann Sheridan, and Anthony Quinn. His stylishly distinctive but raffish clothing seems to have been copied by Frank Sinatra a decade and a half later, and his part is both sympathetic and extremely dramatic. In 1947, he founded the Actors Studio, a non-profit workshop, with actors Robert Lewis and Cheryl Crawford. In 1951, Lee Strasberg became its director after Kazan left for Hollywood to focus on his career as a movie director. It remained a non-profit enterprise. Strasberg introduced the "Method" to the Actors Studio, an umbrella term for a constellation of systems based on Konstantin Stanislavski's teachings. The "Method" school of acting became the predominant system of post-World War II Hollywood.

Among Strasberg's students were Montgomery Clift, Mildred Dunnock, Julie Harris, Karl Malden, Patricia Neal, Maureen Stapleton, Eli Wallach, and James Whitmore. Kazan directed two of the Studio's protégés, Karl Malden and Marlon Brando, in the Tennessee Williams play A Streetcar Named Desire. Although he was at the height of his stage success, Kazan turned to Hollywood to direct motion pictures. He first directed two short films, but his first feature film was A Tree Grows in Brooklyn, one of his first attempts to film dramas focused on contemporary concerns, which later became his forte. Two years later, he directed Gentleman's Agreement, in which he tackled a seldom-discussed topic in the United States, antisemitism, for which he won his first Oscar for Best Director. In 1947, he directed the courtroom drama Boomerang! In 1949, he again tackled a controversial subject when he directed Pinky, which explored issues of racism in the United States, and was nominated for three Academy Awards.

=== 1950s: Rise to prominence ===
In 1950, Kazan directed Panic in the Streets, starring Richard Widmark, a thriller shot on the streets of New Orleans. In that film, Kazan experimented with a documentary-style cinematography, which succeeded in "energizing" the action scenes. He won the Venice Film Festival International Award as director, and the film also won two Academy Awards. Kazan had requested that Zero Mostel also act in the film, despite Mostel being "blacklisted" as a result of HUAC testimony a few years earlier. Kazan writes of his decision:

Each director has a favorite in his cast… my favorite this time was Zero Mostel. … I thought him an extraordinary artist and a delightful companion, one of the funniest and most original men I'd ever met. … I constantly sought his company. … He was one of the three people whom I rescued from the "industry's" blacklist. … For a long time, Zero had not been able to get work in films, but I got him in my film.

In 1951, after introducing and directing Marlon Brando and Karl Malden in the stage version, he went on to cast both in the film version of the play, A Streetcar Named Desire, which won four Oscars and was nominated for twelve. Despite these plaudits, the film was considered a step back, cinematically, with a feel of filmed theater; though Kazan initially used a more open setting, he later felt compelled to revert to a stage atmosphere to remain true to the script. He explains:

On "Streetcar" we worked very hard to open it up, and then went back to the play because we'd lost all the compression. In the play, these people were trapped in a room with each other. What I actually did was to make the set smaller. As the story progressed… the set got smaller and smaller.

Kazan's next film was Viva Zapata! (1952), which also starred Marlon Brando. This time, the film added real atmosphere through location shots and strong character accents. Kazan called this his "first real film" because of those factors. In 1954, he again used Brando as a star in On the Waterfront. As a continuation of the socially relevant themes he developed in New York, the film exposed corruption within the city's longshoremen's union. It too was nominated for twelve Academy Awards, and won eight, including Best Picture, Best Director, and Best Actor for Marlon Brando. On the Waterfront was also the screen debut for Eva Marie Saint, who won the Oscar for Best Supporting Actress for her role. Saint recalls that Kazan selected her for the role after having her perform an improvisational skit with Brando as the other character. She had no idea that he was looking to fill any particular film part, however, but remembers that Kazan set up the scenario with Brando, which brought out surprising emotions:

I ended up crying. Crying and laughing. ... I mean, there was such an attraction there. ... That smile of his. ... He was very tender and funny. ... And Kazan, in his genius, saw the chemistry there.

Life magazine described On the Waterfront as the "most brutal movie of the year" but with "the year's tenderest love scenes", and stated that Saint was a "new discovery" in films. In its cover story about Saint, it speculated that it will probably be as Edie in On the Waterfront that she "starts her real trip to fame". The film used extensive on-location street scenes and waterfront shots and featured a notable score by composer Leonard Bernstein.

After the success of On the Waterfront, he went on to direct another screen adaptation of a John Steinbeck novel, East of Eden (1955). As director, Kazan again used another unknown actor, James Dean. Kazan had seen Dean on stage in New York and, after an audition, gave him the starring role along with an exclusive contract with Warner Bros. Dean flew back to Los Angeles with Kazan in 1954, the first time he had ever flown, bringing his clothes in a brown paper bag. The film's success introduced James Dean to the world and established him as a popular actor. He went on to star in Rebel Without a Cause (1955), directed by Kazan's friend Nicholas Ray, and then Giant (1956), directed by George Stevens.

Author Douglas Rathgeb recounts the difficulties Kazan had in turning Dean into a new star, noting how Dean was a controversial figure at Warner Bros. from the time he arrived. There were rumors that he "kept a loaded gun in his studio trailer; that he drove his motorcycle dangerously down studio streets or sound stages; that he had bizarre and unsavory friends." As a result, Kazan was forced to "baby-sit the young actor in side-by-side trailers", so he would not run away during production. Co-star Julie Harris worked overtime to quell Dean's panic attacks. In general, Dean was oblivious to Hollywood's methods, and Rathgeb notes that "his radical style did not mesh with Hollywood's corporate gears".

Dean was amazed at his own performance on screen when he later viewed a rough cut of the film. Kazan had invited director Nicholas Ray to a private showing, with Dean, as Ray was looking for someone to play the lead in Rebel Without a Cause. Ray watched Dean's powerful performance on the screen, but it seemed impossible that the same person was in the room. Ray felt Dean was shy and totally withdrawn, sitting hunched over. "Dean himself did not seem to believe it", notes Rathgeb. "He watched himself with an odd, almost adolescent fascination, as if he were admiring someone else." The film also made good use of on-location and outdoor scenes, along with effective use of the early widescreen format, making the film one of Kazan's most accomplished works. James Dean died the following year, at the age of 24, in an accident with his sports car about 200 miles north of Los Angeles. He had only made three films, and the only completed film he ever saw was East of Eden.

=== 1960s: Continued work ===
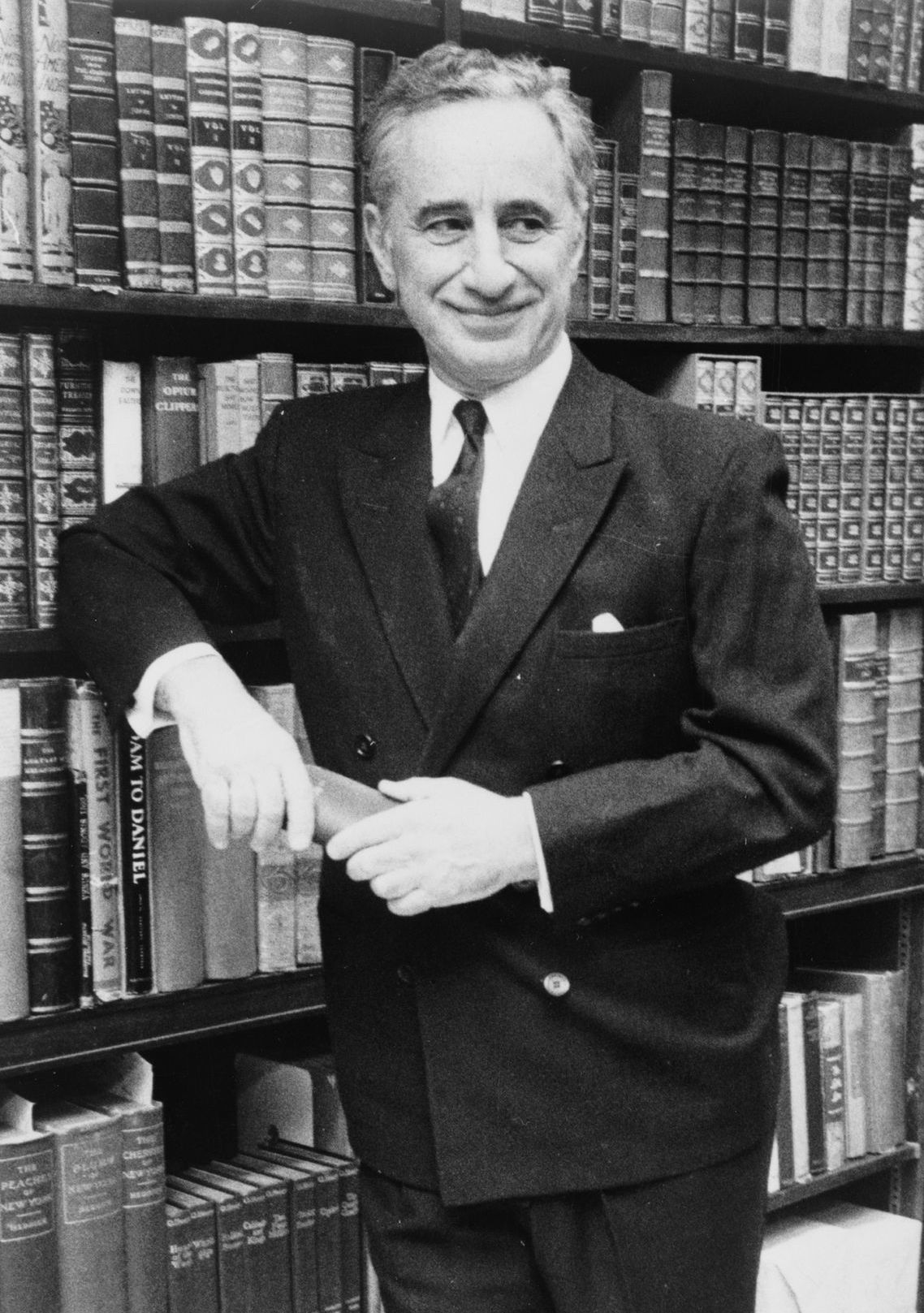
Kazan in 1967

In 1961, Kazan introduced Warren Beatty in his first starring role in Splendor in the Grass (1961), with Natalie Wood; the film was nominated for two Oscars and won one. Author Peter Biskind points out that Kazan "was the first in a string of major directors Beatty sought out, mentors or father figures from whom he wanted to learn." Biskind notes also that they "were wildly dissimilar—mentor vs. protégé, director vs. actor, immigrant outsider vs. native son. Kazan was armed with the confidence born of age and success, while Beatty was virtually aflame with the arrogance of youth." Kazan later recorded his impressions of Beatty:

Warren—it was obvious the first time I saw him—wanted it all and wanted it his way. Why not? He had the energy, a very keen intelligence, and more chutzpah than any Jew I've ever known. Even more than me. Bright as they come, intrepid, and with that thing all women secretly respect: complete confidence in his sexual powers, confidence so great that he never had to advertise himself, even by hints.

Biskind describes an episode during the first week of shooting, where Beatty was angered at something Kazan said: "The star lashed out at the spot where he knew Kazan was most vulnerable, the director's friendly testimony before the HCUA. He snapped, 'Lemme ask you something—why did you name all those names?'" Beatty recalled the episode: "In some patricidal attempt to stand up to the great Kazan, I arrogantly and stupidly challenged him on it." Biskind relates how "Kazan grabbed his arm, asking, 'What did you say?' and dragged him off to a tiny dressing room ... whereupon the director proceeded to justify himself for two hours." Beatty, years later, during a Kennedy Center tribute to Kazan, stated to the audience that Kazan "had given him the most important break in his career". Beatty's co-star, Natalie Wood, was in a transitional period in her career, having mostly been cast as a child or teenager, and was now hoping to be cast in adult roles. Biographer Suzanne Finstad notes that a "turning point" in her life as an actress was upon seeing the film A Streetcar Named Desire: "She was transformed, in awe of Kazan and of Vivien Leigh's performance ... [who] became a role model for Natalie." In 1961, after a "series of bad films, her career was already in decline", notes Rathgeb. Kazan writes that the "sages" of the film community declared her as "washed up" as an actress, although he still wanted to interview her for his next film:

When I saw her, I detected behind the well-mannered 'young wife' front a desperate twinkle in her eyes. ... I talked with her more quietly then and more personally. I wanted to find out what human material was there, what her inner life was. ... Then she told me she was being psychoanalyzed. That did it. Poor R.J. [Wagner, Wood's husband], I said to myself. I liked Bob Wagner, I still do.

Kazan cast her as the female lead in Splendor in the Grass, and her career rebounded. Finstad feels that despite Wood never receiving training in Method acting techniques, "working with Kazan brought her to the greatest emotional heights of her career. The experience was exhilarating but wrenching for Natalie, who faced her demons on Splendor." She adds that a scene in the film, as a result of "Kazan's wizardry ... produced a hysteria in Natalie that may be her most powerful moment as an actress." Actor Gary Lockwood, who also acted in the film, felt that "Kazan and Natalie were a terrific marriage, because you had this beautiful girl, and you had somebody that could get things out of her." Kazan's favorite scene in the movie was the last one, when Wood goes back to see her lost first love, Bud (Beatty). Kazan recalled: "It's terribly touching to me. I still like it when I see it. And I certainly didn't need to tell her how to play it. She understood it perfectly." Kazan wrote novels in the later 1960s, converting two into films: America America, based on his 1962 semi-biographical novel based on his uncle's experiences during the 1896 Hamidian massacres, and The Arrangement which was based on his 1967 novel of the same name. America, America earned Kazan his final Oscars nomination for Best Director.

=== 1970s: Later work ===
Kazan made two final movies in the 1970s starting with The Visitors in 1972, written by his eldest son Chris Kazan and shot entirely on 16mm film. The low-budget film only features five characters and was shot completely on Kazan's country home working with four crew members, and explores the Vietnam War and brutality during wartime. He continued his pattern of making movies with more ambiguous stories and boundaries in his last film in 1976, The Last Tycoon, based on the unfinished novel by F. Scott Fitzgerald. Featuring an ensemble cast including Robert De Niro, Robert Mitchum, Jack Nicholson, Tony Curtis, and Jeanne Moreau, Kazan has described his interpretation of The Last Tycoon as his own views of Hollywood.

== Collaborators ==
Kazan was noted for his close collaboration with screenwriters. On Broadway, he worked with Arthur Miller, Tennessee Williams, and William Inge; in film, he worked again with Willams (A Streetcar Named Desire and Baby Doll), Inge (Splendor in the Grass), Budd Schulberg (On the Waterfront and A Face in the Crowd), John Steinbeck (Viva Zapata!), and Harold Pinter (The Last Tycoon). As an instrumental figure in the careers of many of the best writers of his time, "he always treated them and their work with the utmost respect." In 2009, a previously unproduced screenplay by Williams, The Loss of a Teardrop Diamond, was released as a film. Williams wrote the screenplay specifically for Kazan to direct during the 1950s.

Among Kazan's other films were Panic in the Streets (1950), East of Eden (1955), Baby Doll (1956), Wild River (1960), and The Last Tycoon (1976). Williams became one of Kazan's closest and most loyal friends, and Kazan often pulled Williams out of "creative slumps" by redirecting his focus with new ideas. In 1959, in a letter to Kazan, he writes, "Some day you will know how much I value the great things you did with my work, how you lifted it above its measure by your great gift."

== Directing style ==
On the set of Splendor in the Grass (1961)

=== Preference for unknown actors ===
Kazan strove for "cinematic realism", a quality he often achieved by discovering and working with unknown actors, many of whom treated him as their mentor, which gave him the flexibility to depict "social reality with both accuracy and vivid intensity". He also felt that casting the right actors accounted for 90% of a movie's ultimate success or failure. As a result of his efforts, he also gave actors such as Lee Remick, Jo Van Fleet, Warren Beatty, Andy Griffith, Eva Marie Saint, James Dean and Jack Palance their first major movie roles. He explained to director and producer George Stevens Jr. that he felt that "big stars are barely trained or not very well trained. They also have bad habits ... they're not pliable anymore." Kazan also describes how and why he gets to know his actors on a personal level:

Now what I try to do is get to know them very well. I take them to dinner. I talk to them. I meet their wives. I find out what the hell the human material is that I'm dealing with, so that by the time I take an unknown he's not an unknown to me.

As an example, Kazan recalled during an interview how he came to understand James Dean:

When I met him he said, "I'll take you for a ride on my motorbike ..." It was his way of communicating with me, saying "I hope you like me, ..." I thought he was an extreme grotesque of a boy, a twisted boy. As I got to know his father, as I got to know about his family, I learned that he had been, in fact, twisted by the denial of love ... I went to Jack Warner and told him I wanted to use an absolutely unknown boy. Jack was a crapshooter of the first order, and said, "Go ahead."

=== Topics of personal and social realism ===
Kazan chose his subjects to express personal and social events that he was familiar with. He described his thought process before taking on a project:

I don't move unless I have some empathy with the basic theme. In some way the channel of the film should also be in my own life. I start with an instinct. With East of Eden ... it's really the story of my father and me, and I didn't realize it for a long time. ... In some subtle or not-so-subtle way, every film is autobiographical. A thing in my life is expressed by the essence of the film. Then I know it experientially, not just mentally. I've got to feel that it's in some way about me, some way about my struggles, some way about my pain, my hopes.

Film historian Joanna E. Rapf notes that among the methods Kazan used in his work with actors was his initial focus on "reality", although his style was not defined as "naturalistic". She adds: "He respects his script, but casts and directs with a particular eye for expressive action and the use of emblematic objects." Kazan stated that "unless the character is somewhere in the actor himself, you shouldn't cast him." In his later years, he changed his mind about some of the philosophy behind the Group Theatre, in that he no longer felt that the theater was a "collective art", as he once believed:

To be successful it should express the vision, the conviction, and the insistent presence of one person.

Film author Peter Biskind described Kazan's career as "fully committed to art and politics, with the politics feeding the work". Kazan, however, has downplayed that impression:

I don't think basically I'm a political animal. I think I'm a self-centered animal. ... I think what I was concerned about all my life was to say something artistically that was uniquely my own.

Nonetheless, there have been clear messages in some of his films that involved politics in various ways. In 1954, he directed On the Waterfront, written by screenwriter Budd Schulberg, which was a film about union corruption in New York. Some critics consider it "one of the greatest films in the history of international cinema". Another political film was A Face in the Crowd (1957). His protagonist, played by Andy Griffith (in his film debut), is not a politician, yet his career suddenly becomes deeply involved in politics. According to film author Harry Keyishian, Kazan and screenwriter Budd Schulberg were using the film to warn audiences about the dangerous potential of the new medium of television. Kazan explains that he and Schulberg were trying to warn "of the power TV would have in the political life of the nation". Kazan states, "Listen to what the candidate says; don't be taken in by his charm or his trust-inspiring personality. Don't buy the advertisement; buy what's in the package."

=== Use of "method" acting ===
As a product of the Group Theatre and Actors Studio, he was most noted for his use of "method" actors, especially Brando and Dean. During an interview in 1988, Kazan said, "I did whatever was necessary to get a good performance including so-called Method acting. I made them run around the set, I scolded them, I inspired jealousy in their girlfriends ... The director is a desperate beast! ... You don't deal with actors as dolls. You deal with them as people who are poets to a certain degree." Actor Robert De Niro called him a "master of a new kind of psychological and behavioral faith in acting". Kazan was aware of the limited range of his directing abilities:

I don't have great range. I am no good with music or spectacles. The classics are beyond me. ... I am a mediocre director except when a play or film touches a part of my life's experience. ... I do have courage, even some daring. I am able to talk to actors ... to arouse them to better work. I have strong, even violent feelings, and they are assets.

Kazan explained that he tried to inspire his actors to offer ideas:

When I talk to the actors they begin to give me ideas, and I grab them because the ideas they give me turn them on. I want the breath of life from them rather than the mechanical fulfillment of the movement which I asked for. ... I love actors. I used to be an actor for eight years, so I do appreciate their job.

Kazan held strong ideas about the scenes and would try to merge an actor's suggestions and inner feelings with his own. Despite the strong eroticism created in Baby Doll, for example, he set limits. Before shooting a seduction scene between Eli Wallach and Carroll Baker, he privately asked Wallach, "Do you think you actually go through with seducing that girl?" Wallach writes, "I hadn't thought about that question before, but I answered ... 'No'." Kazan replies, "Good idea, play it that way." Kazan, many years later, explained his rationale for scenes in that film:

What is erotic about sex to me is the seduction, not the act. ... The scene on the swings (Eli Wallach and Carroll Baker) in Baby Doll is my exact idea of what eroticism in films should be.

=== Being an "actor's director" ===
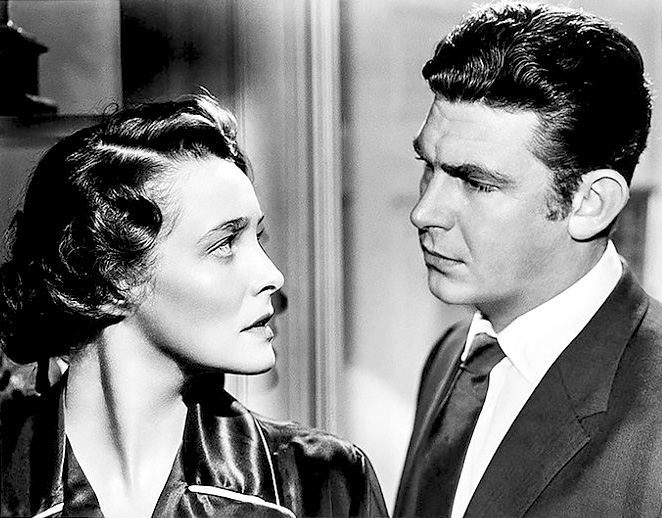
Patricia Neal and Andy Griffith in A Face in the Crowd (1957)

Joanna Rapf adds that Kazan was most admired for his close work with actors, noting that director Nicholas Ray considered him "the best actor's director the United States has ever produced". Film historian Foster Hirsch explains that "he created virtually a new acting style, which was the style of the Method ... [that] allowed for the actors to create great depth of psychological realism".

Among the actors who described Kazan as an important influence in their career was Patricia Neal, who co-starred with Andy Griffith in A Face in the Crowd (1957): "He was very good. He was an actor and he knew how we acted. He would come and talk to you privately. I liked him a lot." Anthony Franciosa, a supporting actor in the film, explains how Kazan encouraged his actors:

He would always say, "Let me see what you can do. Let me see it. Don't talk to me about it." You felt that you had a man who was completely on your side—no qualms about anything you did. He gave you a tremendous sense of confidence. ... He never made me feel as though I was acting for the camera. Many times, I never even knew where the camera was.

In order to get quality acting from Andy Griffith, in his first screen appearance, and achieve what Schickel calls "an astonishing movie debut", Kazan would often take surprising measures. In one important and highly emotional scene, for example, Kazan had to give Griffith fair warning: "I may have to use extraordinary means to make you do this. I may have to get out of line. I don't know any other way of getting an extraordinary performance out of an actor." Actress Terry Moore calls Kazan her "best friend", and notes that "he made you feel better than you thought you could be. I never had another director that ever touched him. I was spoiled for life". "He would find out if your life was like the character", says Carroll Baker, star of Baby Doll; "he was the best director with actors".

Kazan's need to remain close to his actors continued up to his last film, The Last Tycoon (1976). He remembered that Robert De Niro, the star of the film, "would do almost anything to succeed", and even cut his weight down from 170 to 128 pounds for the role. Kazan adds that De Niro "is one of a select number of actors I've directed who work hard at their trade, and the only one who asked to rehearse on Sundays. Most of the others play tennis. Bobby and I would go over the scenes to be shot."

The powerful, dramatic roles Kazan brought out in many of his actors were due, in part, to his ability to recognize their personal traits. Although he did not know De Niro before this film, for example, Kazan later writes, "Bobby is more meticulous ... he's very imaginative. He's very precise. He figures everything out both inside and outside. He has good emotion. He's a character actor: everything he does he calculates. In a good way, but he calculates." Kazan developed and used those personality traits for his character in the film. Although the film did poorly at the box office, some reviewers praised De Niro's acting. Film critic Marie Brenner writes that "for De Niro, it is a role that surpasses even his brilliant and daring portrayal of Vito Corleone in The Godfather, part II, ... [his] performance deserves to be compared with the very finest". Marlon Brando, in his autobiography, goes into detail about the influence Kazan had on his acting:

I have worked with many movie directors—some good, some fair, some terrible. Kazan was the best actors' director by far of any I've worked for ... the only one who ever really stimulated me, got into a part with me and virtually acted it with me ... he chose good actors, encouraged them to improvise, and then improvised on the improvisation ... He gave his cast freedom and ... was always emotionally involved in the process and his instincts were perfect. ... I've never seen a director who became as deeply and emotionally involved in a scene as Gadg ... he got so wrought up that he started chewing on his hat.

He was an arch-manipulator of actors' feelings, and he was extraordinarily talented; perhaps we will never see his like again.

== HUAC testimony ==
Kazan testified before the House Un-American Activities Committee (HUAC) in 1952 during the midst of the Red Scare that journalist Michael Mills calls "arguably the most controversial period in Hollywood history". When Kazan was in his mid-20s in the Depression years 1934 to 1936, he had been a member of the Communist Party USA.

In April 1952, the HUAC called on Kazan, under oath, to identify Communists from that period 16 years earlier. Kazan initially refused to provide names, but eventually named eight former Group Theatre members who he said had been Communists: Clifford Odets, J. Edward Bromberg, Lewis Leverett, Morris Carnovsky, Phoebe Brand, Tony Kraber, Ted Wellman, and Paula Miller (who later married Lee Strasberg). He testified that Odets quit the party at the same time he did. Kazan alleged that all the persons named were already known to the HUAC, although this has been contested. He later acknowledged that he received a letter detailing how his naming of Art Smith damaged the actor's career. Kazan's naming names cost him many friends within the film industry, including playwright Arthur Miller, although Kazan notes the two did work together again.

In his book How We Forgot the Cold War (2012), historian Jon Wiener wrote: "Lots of people named names, but Kazan went further than any of them, when, two days later [after his April 1952 testimony], he took out an ad in the New York Times explaining his reasons for naming names and urging others to follow his example." In his large, defiant ad entitled "A STATEMENT by Elia Kazan", the director briefly chronicled his 1934–1936 experiences in the Communist Party, and then he wrote:

The question will be asked why I did not tell this story sooner. I was held back, primarily, by concern for the reputations and employment of people who may, like myself, have left the Party many years ago.

Kazan added that his time in the Party "left me with the passionate conviction that we must never let the Communists get away with the pretense that they stand for the very things which they kill in their own countries." Decades later in his memoirs, he still struck a defiant tone when describing his "warrior pleasure at withstanding his 'enemies,' who judged him for giving names to the HUAC". He also insisted that despite the snubs he received, he felt no lingering guilt: "There's a normal sadness about hurting people, but I'd rather hurt them a little than hurt myself a lot."

When Kazan received an Honorary Academy Award in 1999, the audience was noticeably divided in their reaction, with some, including Jack Nicholson, Nick Nolte, Ed Harris, Ian McKellen, Frank Langella and Amy Madigan, refusing to applaud, and others, such as actors Kathy Bates, Meryl Streep, Karl Malden, Debbie Allen, and Warren Beatty, and producer George Stevens Jr., standing and applauding. Stevens speculates on why he, Beatty, and many others in the audience chose to stand and applaud:

I never discussed it with Warren, but I believe we were both standing for the same reason—out of regard for the creativity, the stamina and the many fierce battles and lonely nights that had gone into the man's twenty motion pictures.

In an interview for the Associated Press, actor Liam Neeson said: "We are honoring an extraordinary artist. Period. That's what this evening's about." Director Martin Scorsese and actor Robert De Niro presented the award to Kazan, whom he thanked in his acceptance speech. He ended by saying, "I want to thank you all very much. I think I can just slip away."

In 1982, Orson Welles was asked a question about Kazan at the Cinémathèque française in Paris. Welles replied, "Chère mademoiselle, you have chosen the wrong metteur en scène, because Elia Kazan is a traitor. He is a man who sold to McCarthy all his companions at a time when he could continue to work in New York at high salary, and having sold all his people to McCarthy, he then made a film called On the Waterfront which was a celebration of the informer." While the audience applauded, Welles said, "I have to add that he is a very good director."

Los Angeles Times film critic Kenneth Turan wrote, "The only criterion for an award like this is the work." Kazan had already been "denied accolades" by the American Film Institute and other film critics' associations. According to Mills, "It's time for the Academy to recognize this genius", adding that "We applauded when the great Chaplin finally had his hour." In response, Joseph McBride, former vice president of the Los Angeles Film Critics Association, claimed that an honorary award recognizes "the totality of what he represents, and Kazan's career, post 1952, was built on the ruin of other people's careers." In subsequent interviews, Kazan explained some of the early events that made him decide to become a friendly witness, most notably in relation to the Group Theatre, which he called his first "family", and the "best thing professionally" that ever happened to him:

The Group Theatre said that we shouldn't be committed to any fixed political program set by other people outside the organization. I was behaving treacherously to the Group when I met downtown at CP [Communist Party] headquarters, to decide among the Communists what we should do in the Group, and then come back and present a united front, pretending we had not been in caucus ... I was tried by the Party and that was one of the reasons I became so embittered later. The trial was on the issue of my refusal to follow instructions, that we should strike in the Group Theatre, and insist that the membership have control of its organization. I said it was an artistic organization, and I backed up Clurman and Strasberg who were not Communists. ... The trial left an indelible impression on me. ... Everybody else voted against me and they stigmatized me and condemned my acts and attitude. They were asking for confession and self-humbling. I went home that night and told my wife "I am resigning." But for years after I resigned, I was still faithful to their way of thinking. I still believed in it. But not in the American Communists. I used to make a difference and think: "These people here are damned fools but in Russia they have got the real thing", until I learned about the Hitler–Stalin pact, and gave up on the USSR.

Mills observes that prior to becoming a "friendly witness", Kazan discussed his decision-making process during a visit to his Connecticut home from longtime friend Arthur Miller:

To defend a secrecy I don't think right and to defend people who have already been named or soon would be by someone else… I hate the Communists and have for many years, and don't feel right about giving up my career to defend them. I will give up my film career if it is in the interests of defending something I believe in, but not this.

Miller put his arm around Kazan and said, "Don't worry about what I'll think. Whatever you do is okay with me, because I know that your heart is in the right place." Miller had recorded in his journal his own perceptions about this visit. He recalled his sentiments as "being more complex. His anger was not at Kazan, whom he loved like a brother, but at the committee. At the same time he saw a side to his friend that frightened him: 'He would have sacrificed me as well.'"

In his memoirs, Kazan writes that, as a result of his testimony, "the big shot had become the outsider". He also says that it strengthened his friendship with another outsider, Tennessee Williams, with whom he collaborated on numerous plays and films. He called Williams "the most loyal and understanding friend I had through those black months." Kazan appears as a character in Names, Mark Kemble's play about former Group Theatre members' struggles with the House Un-American Activities Committee.

== Personal life and death ==
Kazan was married three times. His first wife was playwright Molly Day Thacher. They were married from 1932 until her death in 1963; this marriage produced two daughters and two sons, including screenwriter Nicholas Kazan. Molly became anti-communist. Film critic Leo Braudy contends that Molly was the principal author of the April 1952 New York Times ad that further estranged Kazan from the Hollywood community.

His second marriage, to the actress Barbara Loden, lasted from 1967 until her death in 1980, and produced one son. His marriage, in 1982, to Frances Rudge continued until his death in 2003. In the early 1930s, Kazan and Molly moved into an 1885 farmhouse in Sandy Hook, Connecticut, where they raised their four children. The family continued to use the property as a summer and weekend retreat until 1998, when the property was put up for sale. In 1978, the U.S. government paid for Kazan and his family to travel to his birthplace, where many of his films were to be shown. During a speech in Athens, he discussed his films and his personal and business life in the U.S., along with the messages he tried to convey:

In my own view, the solution is to talk about human beings and not about abstracts, to reveal the culture and the social moment as it is reflected in the behavior and the lives of individual people. Not to be "correct". To be total. So I do not believe in any ideology that does not permit—no encourage—the freedom of the individual.

Kazan also offered his opinions about the role of the U.S. as a world model for democracy:

I think you and I, all of us, have some sort of stake in the United States. If it fails, the failure will be that of us all. Of mankind itself. It will cost us all. ... I think of the United States as a country which is an arena and in that arena there is a drama being played out. ... I have seen that the struggle is the struggle of free men.

Kazan died from natural causes in his Manhattan apartment on September 28, 2003, aged 94.

In 2017, Carol Drinkwater accused Kazan of sexual harassment and attempted rape in 1975 when she was under consideration for a part in Kazan's film The Last Tycoon.

== Filmography ==
Directed features
Year	Film
1945	A Tree Grows in Brooklyn
1947	The Sea of Grass
1947	Boomerang!
1947	Gentleman's Agreement
1949	Pinky
1950	Panic in the Streets
1951	A Streetcar Named Desire
1952	Viva Zapata!
1953	Man on a Tightrope
1954	On the Waterfront
1955	East of Eden
1956	Baby Doll
1957	A Face in the Crowd
1960	Wild River
1961	Splendor in the Grass
1963	America America
1969	The Arrangement
1972	The Visitors
1976	The Last Tycoon

Documentary

- People of the Cumberland (1937)
- Watchtower Over Tomorrow (1945)

As an actor

- City for Conquest (1940)
- Blues in the Night (1941)

== Awards and nominations ==
Year	Award	Category	Title	Results	Ref.
1947	Academy Awards	Best Director	Gentleman's Agreement	Won	
1951	Academy Awards	Best Director	A Streetcar Named Desire	Nominated	
1954	Academy Awards	Best Director	On the Waterfront	Won	
1955	Academy Awards	Best Director	East of Eden	Nominated	
1963	Academy Awards	Best Picture	America America	Nominated	
1963	Academy Awards	Best Director	America America	Nominated	
1963	Academy Awards	Best Original Screenplay	America America	Nominated	
1998	Academy Awards	Academy Honorary Award	Lifetime Achievement	Won	
1947	Tony Awards	Best Direction	All My Sons	Won	
1949	Tony Awards	Best Direction	Death of a Salesman	Won	
1956	Tony Awards	Best Direction	Cat on a Hot Tin Roof	Nominated	
1958	Tony Awards	Best Play	The Dark at the Top of the Stairs	Nominated	
1958	Tony Awards	Best Direction of a Play	The Dark at the Top of the Stairs	Nominated	
1959	Tony Awards	Best Direction of a Play	J.B.	Won	
1960	Tony Awards	Best Direction of a Play	Sweet Bird of Youth	Nominated	
1948	Golden Globe Awards	Best Motion Picture Director	Gentleman's Agreement	Won	
1954	Golden Globe Awards	Best Motion Picture Director	On The Waterfront	Won	
1956	Golden Globe Awards	Best Motion Picture Director	Baby Doll	Won	
1963	Golden Globe Awards	Best Motion Picture Director	America America	Won	
1952	British Academy Film Awards	Best Film	A Streetcar Named Desire	Nominated	
1952	British Academy Film Awards	Best Film	Viva Zapata!	Nominated	
1954	British Academy Film Awards	Best Film	On the Waterfront	Nominated	
1955	British Academy Film Awards	Best Film	East of Eden	Nominated	
1956	British Academy Film Awards	Best Film	Baby Doll	Nominated	
1952	Cannes Film Festival	Grand Prize of the Festival	Viva Zapata!	Nominated	
1955	Cannes Film Festival	Best Dramatic Film	East of Eden	Won	
1955	Cannes Film Festival	Palme d'Or	East of Eden	Nominated	
1972	Cannes Film Festival	Palme d'Or	The Visitors	Nominated	
1953	Berlin Film Festival	Golden Bear	Man on a Tightrope	Nominated	
1960	Berlin Film Festival	Golden Bear	Wild River	Nominated	
1996	Berlin Film Festival	Honorary Golden Bear	—N/a	Won	
1948	Venice Film Festival	International Award	Gentleman's Agreement	Nominated	
1950	Venice Film Festival	International Award	Panic in the Streets	Nominated	
1950	Venice Film Festival	Golden Lion	Panic in the Streets	Won	
1951	Venice Film Festival	Golden Lion	A Streetcar Named Desire	Nominated	
1951	Venice Film Festival	Special Jury Prize	A Streetcar Named Desire	Won	
1954	Venice Film Festival	Golden Lion	On the Waterfront	Nominated	
1954	Venice Film Festival	Silver Lion	On the Waterfront	Won	
1955	Venice Film Festival	OCIC Award	On the Waterfront	Won	

In addition to these awards, Kazan has a star on the Hollywood Walk of Fame, which is located on 6800 Hollywood Boulevard. He is also a member of the American Theater Hall of Fame.

Accolades for Kazan's motion pictures
Year	Picture	Academy Awards		BAFTA Awards		Golden Globe Awards	
Year	Picture	Nominations	Wins	Nominations	Wins	Nominations	Wins
1945	A Tree Grows in Brooklyn	2	1				
1947	Boomerang	1					
1947	Gentleman's Agreement	8	3			3	3
1949	Pinky	3	3				
1950	Panic in the Streets	1	1				
1951	A Streetcar Named Desire	12	4	2	1	3	1
1952	Viva Zapata!	5	1	2	1	1	
1954	On the Waterfront	12	8	3	1	4	4
1955	East of Eden	4	1	3		1	1
1956	Baby Doll	4		4	1	6	2
1961	Splendor in the Grass	2	1	1		4	1
1963	America America	4	1			6	2
1976	The Last Tycoon	1					
Total		59	24	15	4	28	14

=== Directed Academy Award Performances ===
Under Kazan's direction, these actors have received Oscar nominations (and wins) for their performances in their respective roles.

Year	Performer	Film	Winner
Academy Award for Best Actor
1947	Gregory Peck	Gentleman's Agreement	Nominated
1951	Marlon Brando	A Streetcar Named Desire	Nominated
1952	Marlon Brando	Viva Zapata!	Nominated
1954	Marlon Brando	On the Waterfront	Won
1955	James Dean	East of Eden	Nominated
Academy Award for Best Actress
1947	Dorothy McGuire	Gentleman's Agreement	Nominated
1949	Jeanne Crain	Pinky	Nominated
1951	Vivien Leigh	A Streetcar Named Desire	Won
1956	Carroll Baker	Baby Doll	Nominated
1961	Natalie Wood	Splendor in the Grass	Nominated
Academy Award for Best Supporting Actor
1945	James Dunn	A Tree Grows in Brooklyn	Won
1951	Karl Malden	A Streetcar Named Desire	Won
1952	Anthony Quinn	Viva Zapata!	Won
1954	Lee J. Cobb	On the Waterfront	Nominated
1954	Karl Malden	On the Waterfront	Nominated
1954	Rod Steiger	On the Waterfront	Nominated
Academy Award for Best Supporting Actress
1947	Celeste Holm	Gentleman's Agreement	Won
1947	Anne Revere	Gentleman's Agreement	Nominated
1949	Ethel Barrymore	Pinky	Nominated
1949	Ethel Waters	Pinky	Nominated
1951	Kim Hunter	A Streetcar Named Desire	Won
1954	Eva Marie Saint	On the Waterfront	Won
1955	Jo Van Fleet	East of Eden	Won
1956	Mildred Dunnock	Baby Doll	Nominated

== Legacy ==
The trailer for Viva Zapata (1952) with Marlon Brando and Anthony Quinn

Kazan became known as an "actor's director" because he was able to elicit some of the best performances in the careers of many of his stars. Under his direction, his actors received 24 Academy Award nominations and won nine Oscars. He won as Best Director for Gentleman's Agreement (1947) and for On the Waterfront (1954). Both A Streetcar Named Desire (1951) and On the Waterfront were nominated for twelve Academy Awards, respectively winning four and eight. With his many years with the Group Theatre and Actors Studio in New York City and later triumphs on Broadway, he became famous "for the power and intensity of his actors' performances". He was the pivotal figure in launching the film careers of Marlon Brando, James Dean, Julie Harris, Eli Wallach, Eva Marie Saint, Warren Beatty, Lee Remick, Karl Malden, and many others. Seven of Kazan's films won a total of 20 Academy Awards. Dustin Hoffman commented that he "doubted whether he, Robert De Niro, or Al Pacino, would have become actors without Mr. Kazan's influence."

Upon his death, at the age of 94, The New York Times characterized him as "one of the most honored and influential directors in Broadway and Hollywood history". Death of a Salesman and A Streetcar Named Desire, two plays he directed, are considered to be some of the greatest of the 20th century. Although he became a respected director on Broadway, he made an equally impressive transition into one of the major film directors of his time. Critic William Baer notes that throughout his career "he constantly rose to the challenge of his own aspirations", adding that "he was a pioneer and visionary who greatly affected the history of both stage and cinema". Certain of his film-related material and personal papers are contained in the Wesleyan University Cinema Archives to which scholars and media experts from around the world may have full access.

His controversial appearance before the House Un-American Activities Committee in 1952 was the low point in his career, although he remained convinced he made the right decision to give the names of Group Theatre colleagues who had been Communist Party members. He stated in an interview in 1976 that "I would rather do what I did than crawl in front of a ritualistic Left and lie the way those other comrades did, and betray my own soul. I didn't betray it. I made a difficult decision."

During his career, Kazan won both Tony and Oscar Awards for directing on stage and screen. In 1982, President Ronald Reagan presented him with the Kennedy Center honors award, a national tribute for lifetime achievement in the arts. At the ceremony, screenwriter Budd Schulberg, who wrote On the Waterfront, thanked his lifelong friend saying, "Elia Kazan has touched us all with his capacity to honor not only the heroic man, but the hero in every man."

In 1999, at the 71st Academy Awards, Martin Scorsese and Robert De Niro presented the Honorary Oscar to Kazan. This would be a controversial pick for the Academy of Motion Picture Arts and Sciences due to Kazan's history regarding his involvement with the Hollywood Blacklist in the 1950s. Several members of the audience including Nick Nolte, Amy Madigan, and Ed Harris refused to applaud Kazan when he received the award while others such as Warren Beatty, Meryl Streep, Kathy Bates, and Kurt Russell gave him a standing ovation.

Martin Scorsese directed a film documentary, A Letter to Elia (2010), considered to be an "intensely personal and deeply moving tribute" to Kazan. Scorsese was "captivated" by Kazan's films as a young man, and the documentary mirrors his own life story while he also credits Kazan as the inspiration for his becoming a filmmaker. It won a Peabody Award in 2010.

== Published works ==
- America America. New York: Popular Library. 1962. OCLC 21378773.
- The Arrangement: A Novel. New York: Stein and Day. 1967. OCLC 36500300.
- The Assassins. London: Collins. 1972. ISBN 0-00-221035-5.
- Ciment, Michel (1974). Kazan on Kazan. Viking. Originally published in 1973 by Secker and Warburg, London.
- The Understudy. New York: Stein and Day. 1974. OCLC 317087062.
- A Kazan Reader. New York: Stein and Day. 1977. ISBN 0-8128-2193-9.
- Acts of Love. New York: Warner. 1978. ISBN 0-446-85553-7.
- The Anatolian. New York: Knopf. 1982. ISBN 0-394-52560-4.
- Elia Kazan: A Life. New York: Knopf. 1988. ISBN 0-394-55953-3.
- Beyond the Aegean. New York: Knopf. 1994. ISBN 0-679-42565-9.
- Kazan, Elia; Young, Jeff (1999). The Master Director Discusses His Films. New York: Newmarket Press. ISBN 1-55704-338-8.
- Kazan on Directing. New York: Knopf. 2009. ISBN 978-0-307-26477-0.
