= The Seven Moons of Maali Almeida =

2022 novel by Shehan Karunatilaka

- Cover of 2022 first edition
- Author: Shehan Karunatilaka
- Original title: Devil Dance; Chats with the Dead
- Language: English
- Set in: Sri Lanka
- Publisher: Sort of Books
- Publication date: 4 August 2022
- Publication place: England
- Media type: Print
- Awards: 2022 Booker Prize
- ISBN: 9781908745903
- Preceded by: Chinaman: The Legend of Pradeep Mathew

The Seven Moons of Maali Almeida is a novel by Sri Lankan author Shehan Karunatilaka and winner of the 2022 Booker Prize. It was published in 2022 by the small, independent London-based publisher Sort of Books. An earlier version of the novel had been published in the Indian subcontinent in 2020 under the title Chats with the Dead.

== Summary ==
The novel is set in Sri Lanka in the 1980s, and written in the second person. The central character, Maali Almeida, a "photographer, gambler and slut" is already dead. He sets out to solve the mystery of his own death and is accorded one week ("seven moons") in a sort of limbo populated by innumerable ghosts holding onto their memory and their contact with the world, before having to either pass into "The Light" and reincarnation or remain in the "In Between". In this time, he hopes to help his friends retrieve and expose his photographs, which show government complicity in the brutality of the Sri Lankan Civil War.

== Background and publication ==
Karunatilaka wrote his second novel in various versions with different titles. When the first draft was shortlisted for the Gratiaen Prize in 2015, it was titled Devil Dance. The novel was originally published in the Indian subcontinent as Chats with the Dead in 2020 by Penguin India's Hamish Hamilton imprint.

Karunatilaka struggled to find an international publisher for the novel because most deemed Sri Lankan politics "esoteric and confusing" and many felt "the mythology and worldbuilding was impenetrable, and difficult for Western readers." The independent British publishing house Sort of Books agreed to publish the novel after editing to "make it familiar to Western readers." Karunatilaka revised the work for two years due to its publication being delayed by the COVID-19 pandemic. He has commented: "I'd say it's the same book, but it benefits from two years of tightening and is much more accessible. It is a bit confusing to have the same book with two different titles, but I think the eventual play is that The Seven Moons of Maali Almeida will become the definitive title and text."

== Reception ==
The Seven Moons of Maali Almeida won the 2022 Booker Prize, announced at a ceremony at The Roundhouse in London on 17 October 2022, the award being presented to the author by Queen Camilla. The judges – the panel comprising Neil MacGregor (chair), Shahidha Bari, Helen Castor, M. John Harrison, and Alain Mabanckou – said that the novel "fizzes with energy, imagery and ideas against a broad, surreal vision of the Sri Lankan civil wars. Slyly, angrily comic."

=== Review coverage ===
The Seven Moons of Maali Almeida was characterised by Charlie Connelly in The New European as "part ghost story, part whodunnit, part political satire ... a wonderful book about Sri Lanka, friendship, grief and the afterlife". The verdict of The Sydney Morning Herald was: "Original, sensational, imaginative, political, mysterious, romantic: it is obvious why this novel won the prize. ...It has the bleak power of Solzhenitsyn's The Gulag Archipelago. And unlike that great book it is relentlessly, shockingly funny."

The review by Randy Boyagoda in The New York Times said that the novel "offers a very palatable combination of literary-political-ethical challenges, enjoyments and validations to its readers, including a sense of timeliness." Literary Review observed: "Witty, inventive and moving, Karunatilaka’s prose is gloriously free of cliché, and despite the apparent cynicism of his smart-alec narrator, this is a deeply moral book that eschews the simple moralising of so much contemporary fiction."

Describing the novel as "brilliant", the TLS review continued: "It is messy and chaotic in all the best ways. It is also a pleasure to read: Karunatilaka writes with tinder-dry wit and an unfaltering ear for prose cadences." The Financial Times reviewer concluded: "The Seven Moons of Maali Almeida is an ambitious novel, epic in scope (mixing tropes from thrillers, crime fiction and magic realism) and a powerful evocation of Sri Lanka's brutal past." Ron Charles of The Washington Post similarly praised the novel, saying, "Karunatilaka’s story drifts across Sri Lankan history and culture with a spirit entirely its own...The novel’s deeper themes reach beyond politics to the problem of evil that threads through every theology and moral code."

In a starred review, Kirkus Reviews described the novel as "A manic, witty, artfully imagined tale of speaking truth to power."

== Releases ==
- Karunatilaka, Shehan (2022). The Seven Moons of Maali Almeida. London: Sort of Books. ISBN 978-1-908745-90-3.
- Karunatilaka, Shehan (2020). Chats with the Dead. Gurugram: Penguin Random House India. ISBN 978-0-670-09329-8.

Translations (selection):

- Karunatilaka, Shehan (2023). As sete luas de Maali Almeida (in Portuguese). Translated by Antunes, Eugénia. Lisboa: Clube do Autor. ISBN 978-989-724-692-0.
- Karunatilaka, Shehan (2023). De zeven manen van Maali Almeida (in Dutch). Translated by Neugarten, Robert. Amsterdam: Spectrum. ISBN 978-90-00-38838-7.
- Karunatilaka, Shehan (2023). Die sieben Monde des Maali Almeida (in German). Translated by Meyer, Hannes. Hamburg: Rowohlt. ISBN 978-3-498-00369-2.
- Karunatilaka, Shehan (2023). Las siete lunas de Maali Almeida (in Spanish). Translated by Cabeza Lázaro, Ankara. Madrid: Plata. ISBN 978-84-92919-39-0.
- Karunatilaka, Shehan (2023). Le sette lune di Maali Almeida (in Italian). Translated by Castoldi, Silvia. Roma: Fazi. ISBN 979-12-5967-383-1.
- Karunatilaka, Shehan (2023). Siedem księżyców Maalego Almeidy (in Polish). Translated by Gądek, Mariusz. Warszawa: Marginesy. ISBN 978-83-67790-93-2.
- Karunatilaka, Shehan (2023). Τα Εφτά Φεγγάρια του Μάαλι Αλμέιντα (in Greek). Translated by Χατχούτ, Ρένα. Αθήνα: Gutenberg. ISBN 978-960-01-2438-5.
