= Helen Castor =

English historian

Helen Castor FRSL
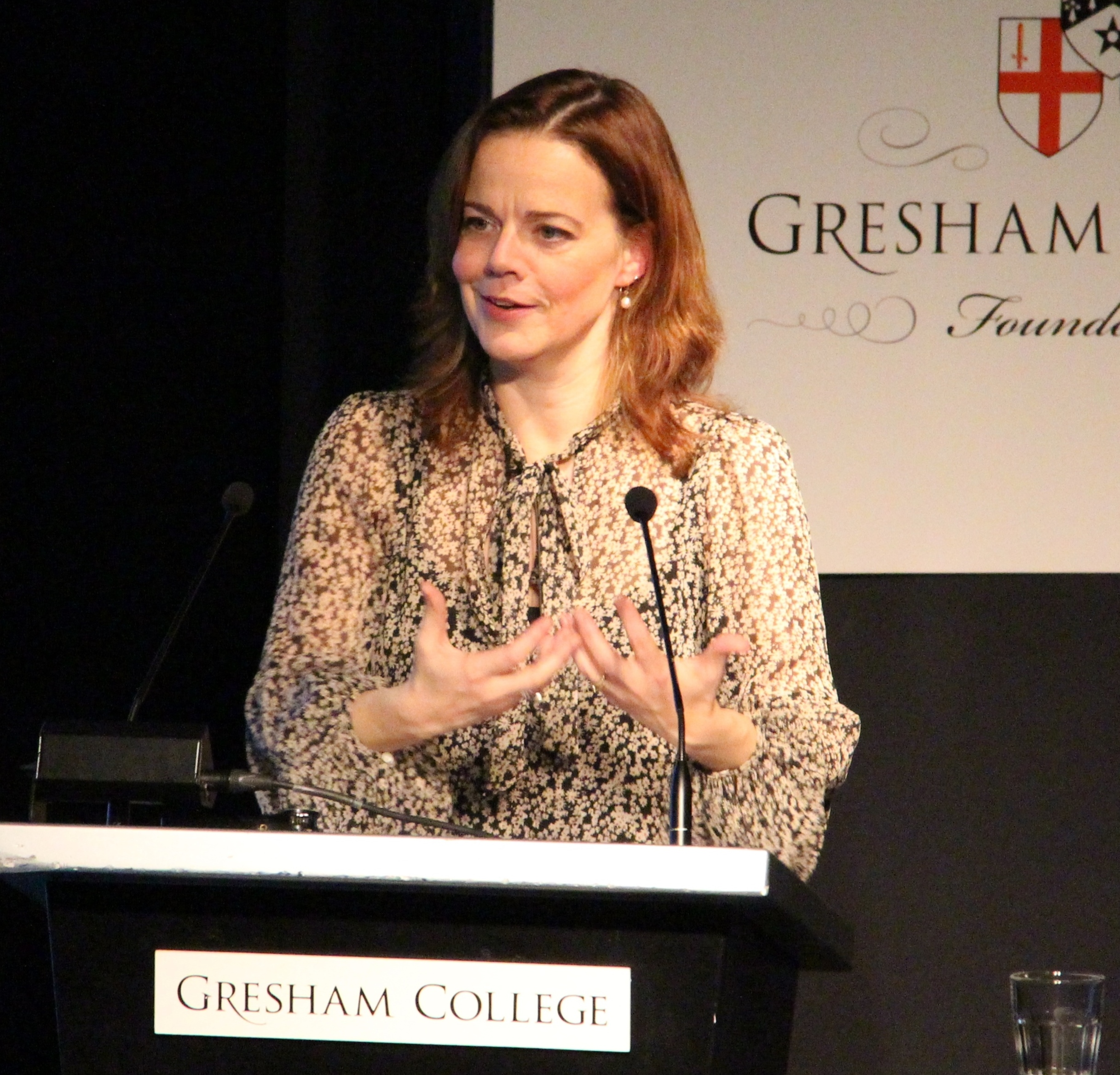
- Castor in 2015
- Born: Helen Ruth Castor; 4 August 1968 (age 58); Cambridge, Cambridgeshire, England
- Occupations: Historian, author and broadcaster
- Awards: Beatrice White Prize

Academic background
- Education: The King's High School for Girls
- Alma mater: Gonville and Caius College, Cambridge (BA, PhD)
- Thesis: The Duchy of Lancaster in the Lancastrian polity, 1399-1461 (1993)
- Doctoral advisor: Christine Carpenter

Academic work
- Institutions: Jesus College, Cambridge; Sidney Sussex College, Cambridge
- Notable works: Blood and Roses

Helen Ruth Castor FRSL (born 4 August 1968) is a British historian of the medieval and Tudor period and a BBC broadcaster. She taught history at the University of Cambridge and is the author of books including Blood and Roses (2004) and She-Wolves: The Women Who Ruled England Before Elizabeth (2010). Programmes she has presented include BBC Radio 4's Making History and She-Wolves on BBC Four. Her most recent book is The Eagle and the Hart: The Tragedy of Richard II and Henry IV (2024).

== Early life and education ==
Helen Castor was born in Cambridge and attended The King's High School for Girls, Warwick, from 1979 to 1986, and then completed a B.A. and a Ph.D. at Gonville and Caius College, Cambridge. Her doctoral thesis was titled "The Duchy of Lancaster in the Lancastrian polity, 1399-1461". She was elected to a Research Fellowship at Jesus College.

She was a Fellow of Sidney Sussex College for eight years, and is now a Bye-fellow.

== Career ==
Castor was Director of Studies in History at Sidney Sussex College for eight years before focusing on writing and media.

=== Broadcasting ===
Castor has worked extensively for the BBC including presenting Radio 4's Making History and She-Wolves on BBC Four. In 2013 she was a member of the winning team on Christmas University Challenge, representing Gonville & Caius College, Cambridge.

=== Literary review ===
She has written for the books pages of The Guardian, Sunday Telegraph, Sunday Times, The Times Literary Supplement and The Times Educational Supplement. She was part of the judging panel for the 2022 Booker Prize.

=== Writing ===
Castor's book Blood and Roses (2004) is a biography of the 15th-century Paston family, whose letters are the earliest-surviving collection of private correspondence in the English language. Blood and Roses was long-listed for the Samuel Johnson Prize for non-fiction in 2005. It was also awarded the Beatrice White Prize for outstanding scholarly work in the field of English literature before 1590, by the English Association in 2006.

She-Wolves (2010) was voted one of the books of the year in the Guardian, Times, Sunday Times, Independent, Financial Times and BBC History Magazine. BBC Four televised a three-part series based on the book in 2012, presented by Castor.

Castor wrote the volume on Elizabeth I for the series Penguin Monarchs, Elizabeth I: A Study in Insecurity, published in 2018.

Castor was elected a Fellow of the Royal Society of Literature in 2017.

She was shortlisted for the 2025 Wolfson History Prize for The Eagle and the Hart.

=== The Booker Prize ===
In 2022 Castor was chosen alongside four other 'superb readers' to judge the 2022 Booker Prize competition for best novel of the year. The judging panel of Castor, broadcaster Shahidha Bari, novelist and critic M. John Harrison, novelist and poet Alain Mabanckou, and cultural historian, writer, broadcaster and panel chair Neil MacGregor selected The Seven Moons of Maali Almeida by Shehan Karunatilaka. The judges admired the "ambition of its scope, and the hilarious audacity of its narrative techniques".

== Personal life ==
Castor lives in London with her husband. Her sister is the children's author, Harriet Castor Jeffrey.

== Books ==
- The King, the Crown, and the Duchy of Lancaster: Public Authority and Private Power, 1399–1461 (2000) Oxford University Press ISBN 0198206224
- Blood and Roses: One Family's Struggle and Triumph During the Tumultuous Wars of the Roses (2004) Faber and Faber ISBN 0571216706
- She-Wolves: The Women Who Ruled England Before Elizabeth (2010) Faber and Faber ISBN 0571237053
- Joan of Arc: A History (2014) Faber and Faber ISBN 0571284620
- Elizabeth I: A Study in Insecurity (Penguin Monarchs) (2018) Allen Lane ISBN 0141980885
- The Eagle and the Hart: The Tragedy of Richard II and Henry IV (2024) Allen Lane ISBN 0241419328

== Television ==
- A Renaissance Education: The Schooling of Thomas More's Daughter (2011) BBC Four
- She-Wolves: England's Early Queens (2012) BBC Four
- Medieval Lives: Birth, Marriage and Death (2013) BBC Four
- Joan of Arc: God's Warrior (2015) BBC Two
- The Real Versailles (2016) BBC Two
- Women Sex and Society: A Timewatch Guide (2016) BBC Four
- England's Forgotten Queen: The Life and Death of Lady Jane Grey (2018) BBC Four

== Radio ==
- England: Made in the Middle (2016) BBC Radio 4
