= 2022 Booker Prize =

British literary award given in 2022

- Date: 17 October 2022
- Location: Roundhouse, London
- Country: United Kingdom & Ireland

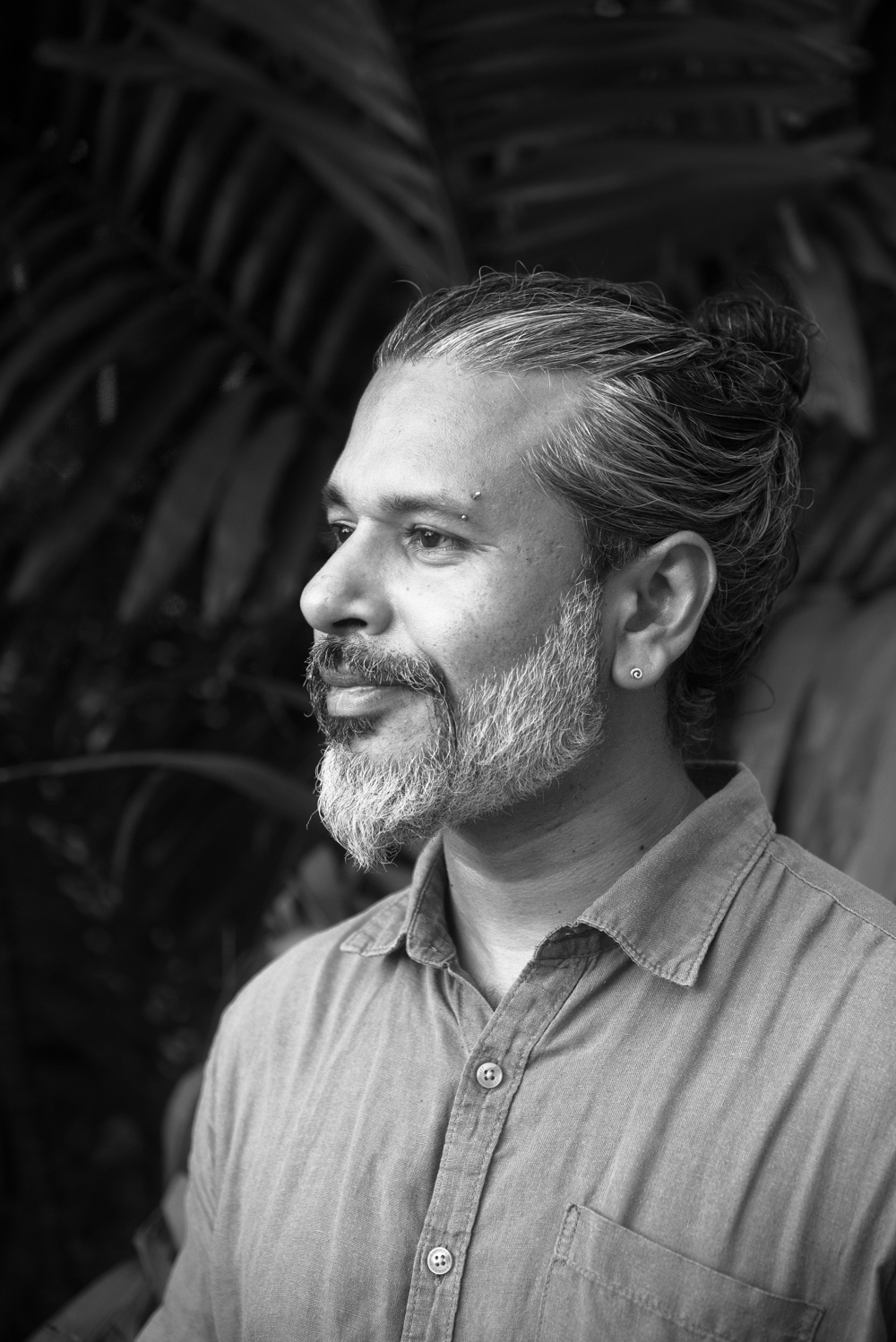
Shehan Karunatilaka, winner of the 2022 Booker Prize

The Booker Prize is a literary award given for the best English novel of the year. The 2022 award was announced on 17 October 2022, during a ceremony hosted by Sophie Duker at the Roundhouse in London. The longlist was announced on 26 July 2022. The shortlist was announced on 6 September. Leila Mottley, at 20, was the youngest longlisted writer to date, and Alan Garner, at 87, the oldest. The majority of the 13 titles were from independent publishers. The prize was awarded to Shehan Karunatilaka for his novel, The Seven Moons of Maali Almeida, receiving £50,000. He is the second Sri Lankan to win the prize, after Michael Ondaatje.

== Judging panel ==
- Neil MacGregor (chair)
- Shahidha Bari
- Helen Castor
- M. John Harrison
- Alain Mabanckou

== Nominees ==
indicates the winner

=== Shortlist ===
Author	Title	Genre(s)	Country	Publisher
Shehan Karunatilaka	The Seven Moons of Maali Almeida	Novel	Sri Lanka	Sort of Books
NoViolet Bulawayo	Glory	Novel	Zimbabwe/USA	Vintage Publishing
Percival Everett	The Trees	Novel	USA	Influx Press
Alan Garner	Treacle Walker	Novel	England	HarperCollins
Claire Keegan	Small Things Like These	Novel	Ireland	Faber & Faber
Elizabeth Strout	Oh William!	Novel	USA	Penguin Books

=== Longlist ===
Author	Title	Genre(s)	Country	Publisher
NoViolet Bulawayo	Glory	Novel	Zimbabwe/USA	Vintage Publishing
Graeme Macrae Burnet	Case Study	Novel	Scotland	Saraband
Hernan Diaz	Trust	Novel	USA	Pan Macmillan
Percival Everett	The Trees	Novel	USA	Influx Press
Karen Joy Fowler	Booth	Novel	USA	Profile Books
Alan Garner	Treacle Walker	Novel	England	HarperCollins
Claire Keegan	Small Things Like These	Novel	Ireland	Faber & Faber
Shehan Karunatilaka	The Seven Moons of Maali Almeida	Novel	Sri Lanka	Sort of Books
Audrey Magee	The Colony	Novel	Ireland	Faber & Faber
Maddie Mortimer	Maps of Our Spectacular Bodies	Novel	England	Pan Macmillan
Leila Mottley	Nightcrawling	Novel	USA	Bloomsbury
Selby Wynn Schwartz	After Sappho	Novel	USA	Galley Beggar Press
Elizabeth Strout	Oh William!	Novel	USA	Penguin Books

== See also ==
- List of winners and shortlisted authors of the Booker Prize for Fiction
