= Tolulope Popoola =

Nigerian writer

- Education: London Metropolitan University; University of Nottingham
- Writing career
- Genre: Romance
- Notable work: Nothing Comes Close (2012)
- Notable awards: Nigeria Writers' Award

Tolulope Popoola is a Nigerian author, creative writing coach and content editor who writes romance novels and flash fiction. Her writings and excerpts from her stories have been featured in several publications and magazines. Also a publisher and creative writing coach, she is based in the United Kingdom. Her focus on the flash fiction genre has earned her the title of the "African Flash Fiction Queen".

== Career ==
Popoola earned a BA degree in Accounting and Business Economics from London Metropolitan University, and a Master's degree in Finance and Investment from the University of Nottingham, before beginning to work as an administrator and then an accountant.

She began writing in 2008, after resigning from her accounting job. She wrote her first book in 2009, but decided not to publish after discovering it was coincidentally overtly similar to In Dependence (2008) by Sarah Ladipo Manyika. In 2012, she published her first romance novel, Nothing Comes Close. The book was listed as one of the best books of 2012 by the Africa Writers Club.

Popoola is also the author of the novels Fertile Imagination and Looking for Something. She is the founder and editor of Accomplish Press, a publishing company she established mainly to accommodate "ethnic fiction" novels.

In an interview with an award-winning, New York Times and USA Today bestselling author Joanna Penn, Popoola revealed that she uses both traditional and online media for her book marketing strategy, targeting local and international audiences. Her approach to writing and publishing involves separating "the emotional investment in my writing from the business side of publishing," a strategy that enables her to function as a supportive, empathic creative writing coach, and an objective publisher.

As part of Accomplish Press, Popoola runs a Creative Writing Club for Kids and Teenagers where she tutors them on core concepts of creative writing, providing close one-on-one mentorship to bring the best out of each student. The Creative Writing Club has won awards, including Most Innovative Creative Writing Club – East London and Best Creative Writing Coaching Company 2024

In 2015, Popoola wrote a short story titled "The Alibi" that was featured on Pulse, about an unusual relationship between a maid and a housewife. She is the author of the Lagos Flash Fiction Series.

In 2017, Popoola was named one of ten Africans in Lancome's list of most powerful and diverse African women.

=== Bibliography ===
==== Fiction ====
- Popoola, Tolulope (2010). In My Dreams It Was Simpler. Lulu Press, Incorporated. ISBN 9781445254203.
- Popoola, Tolulope (2012). Fertile Imagination: A Collection of Flash Fiction Stories. ISBN 9780957186637.
- Popoola, Tolulope (2012). Nothing Comes Close. Accomplish Press. ISBN 9780957186606.
- Popoola, Tolulope (2015). Looking For Something: A Collection of Flash Fiction Stories. ISBN 9780993177125.
- The Lagos Flash Fiction series:
  1. Memoirs of a Lagos Wedding Planner (May 2025) ASIN 0463936035
  2. Memoirs of a Lagos Taxi Driver (May 2025) ASIN B0F9CQMPHK
  3. Memoirs of a Lagos Junior Banker (May 2025) ASIN B0DYG84Y5Q
  4. Memoirs of a Serial Best Man ASIN B0DY1ZTLPK
  5. Memoirs of a Lagos Baker (April 2025) ASIN B0F25GYXN7
  6. More Adventures of a Lagos Wedding Planner (March 2025) ASIN B0DY1YZT5X

==== Non Fiction ====
- Avoiding the New Author Trap: Self-Publishing Success for First Time Authors ASIN B01BOTMGM0
- The Procrastination Cure: How to Beat Procrastination and Get Your Book Published ASIN B01BOSZAL0

=== Recognition ===
- 2012: New venture award by Women in Publishing UK (2nd Runner-Up)
- 2016: Special Award of Excellence by Nigeria Writers Awards
- 2017: Diaspora Writer of the year by Nigeria Writers Awards (Nominee)
- 2017: 100 Most influential Nigerian Writers under 40 (Listed)
- 2025: Brittle Paper Writer of The Month (June)
