= Tsholotsho District =

Tsholotsho Tjolotjo
- administrative district
- Motto: Sisebenzela iTsholotsho eluhlaza
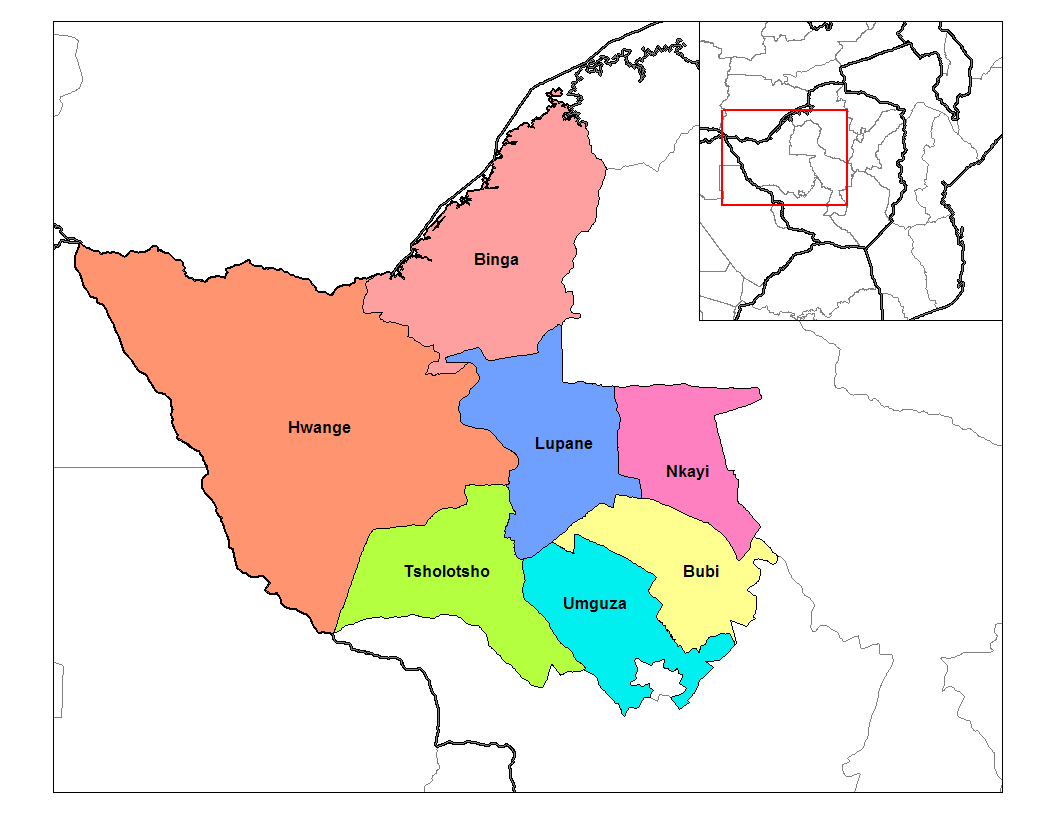
- Tsholotsho in Matabeleland North Province
- Coordinates: 19°46′S 27°45′E
- Country: Zimbabwe
- Province: Matabeleland North

Government
  - Members of Parliament: Zenzo Sibanda; Sibangumuzi Khumalo
  - Chiefs: Nqgoya: Gampu Sithole; Magama Hadebe; Siphoso Dlodlo; Mswigana Moyo; Mathuphula Khumalo; Mahlathini Jiyane

Area
  - Total: 7,844 km^{2} (3,029 sq mi)

Population (2022)
  - Total: 115,782
  - Density: 14.76/km^{2} (38.23/sq mi)
- Time zone: UTC+2 (CAT)

Tsholotsho, originally known as Tjolotjo, is a district in Matabeleland North province in Zimbabwe. Its administrative centre is at Tsholotsho business centre which is located about 98 km north-west of Bulawayo. Districts around Tsholotsho include Lupane, Hwange, Umguza, and Bulilima. The Manzamnyama River separates Tsholotsho from Bulilima District, whilst the Gwayi River separates it from Umguza and Lupane districts, and the Hwange National Park separates it from Hwange District.

== History ==
The area was known for its elephant herds and had attracted early ivory hunters. It was occupied by the Bakalanga and San people before the arrival of Mzilikazi and the Ndebele in the 1830s. The name "Tsholotsho" (previously spelled "Tjolotjo") is derived from the San word "Tsoro o tso" meaning the "head of an elephant". It was part of the Kingdom of Butua and the king or mambo madlimbewu or dlimbewu was based at Khami at the time. Most villages in Tsholotsho have pure Bakalanga names. Later it became part of the Rozvi Empire.

When the Ndebele arrived in 1838 they adopted the name "Tsholotsho". Mzilikazi left the area under the administration of one of his chiefs, Maqhekeni Sithole. when he moved to Matopo to meet up with the rest of the Ndebele group. Chief Gampu Sithole, the great-great-grandson of Maqhekeni is one of the five reigning chiefs today. The area has vast grazing lands there and people in Tsholotsho usually take their cattle for fattening in some of the popular grazing lands and they call it ukulagisa.

The district centre of Tsholotsho is situated about 65 kilometres west of Nyamandlovu in the former Gwayi Tribal Trust land. It has been an administrative centre for the trust land for many years and fell under the jurisdiction of the Native Commissioner for Nyamandlovu who first assumed responsibility in 1909. Prior to this date the area fell under the jurisdiction of the Superintendent of Natives at Bulawayo.

The District Service Centre is linked to Bulawayo and Lupane by tarred roads and Plumtree by a gravel road and other roads lead through very heavy Kalahari sands (itshebetshebe) into the Gwayi Tribal Trust areas and beyond into the forest reserves. The soils around the precincts of the village are regosols derived from Kalahari sands and shallow rocky basalt-derived pockets are to be found in the district. There is a belt of alluvium along the Gwayi river which has led numerous prospectors in the search of minerals and precious and semi-precious stones. An industrial school was founded at Mavela in 1921 by H. S. Keigwin, who also had a hand in establishing a similar institution at Domboshawa in Mashonaland the following year. The original course was designed by E. D. Alvord, who was then an agricultural missionary at Mount Selinda, where he had started instructing African students on similar lines in 1920. The school was moved to Essexvale (Esigodini) between the years 1941 and 1944 and renamed "Esikhoveni Agricultural Institute". It is fitting that Mr. Alvord's son D. L. Alvord should have been appointed the principal of the college.

After the college was transferred to Essexvale, the vacated land was used as an experimental substation of the Matopos Research Station, where the work is primarily concerned with the breeding of indigenous Nkone or 'Nguni' cattle. These animals which originally came from Eswatini and Zululand were brought by the Matabele during their northward migrations in the first half of the 19th century. These cattle are believed to have originated from a shorthorn-sanga cross. The name sanga was applied to the giant horned cattle of Abyssinia. The head and horns form the principal conformational features by which the breed is identified; their most characteristic feature when mature, being the lyre-shape.

== Geography ==
=== Geology ===
Tsholotsho is located in an area which once used to be a waterlogged basin over 250 million years ago. This basin can be traced as far north as Hwange and is responsible for the formation of the coal deposits in Hwange. Tsholotsho has two principal rivers which are Manzamnyama and Gwayi. The rivers are relatively wide being over 100m in places but usually only flow during the rains.

Tsholotsho is composed of mainly three types of soils. The Kalahari Sands cover large part of the district. These are located on the North Western areas of Tsholotsho from Korodziba through Dlamini right up to Jimila. The Kalahari Sands can also be found in the North-Central areas like Sipepa and Kapani. The rich black Clay soils are found in a 4 km wide belt stretching about 2 km either side of Gwayi River in what can be called "The Gwayi River flood plain". This area is prone to flooding as in the case of Mahlaba and waterlogging as in the case of Shakiwa (Matemaule). The red clay soils can be found in the south-eastern areas of Tsholotsho right from Somgqibe through Mapulubusi, Madona and right up to Ngqoya.

=== Flora and fauna ===
Tsholotsho is home to hardwoods such as the teak, these being found in the Kalahari sands. The clays are home to the thorn acacia and extensively covered grassland areas. Due to its location next to Hwange National Park, Tsholotsho is home to a variety of wildlife, including elephants, buffalo, lions and other species found in the region.

== Population ==
Tsholotsho is home to three ethnic groups, these being the Ndebele, Kalanga (along the Manzamnyama river) and the San (closer to the Hwange national park. The principal language is Ndebele which is spoken and understood by practically everyone in the district. It has a total population of 115,782 people, according to the 2022 national census (comprising 53,813 males and 61,969 females).

== Economy ==
The main economic activity in Tsholotsho is farming. The soils are bad for cultivation except the black clay soils along Gwayi River. The Kalahari sands are surprisingly good for cattle rearing though they need massive investment in terms of reliable water provision and disease prevention. Farming and cattle rearing are the main economic activities. Many residents migrate to South Africa for employment opportunities. The district has a food poverty prevalence of 45%.

An industrial school was founded here in 1921 but was relocated to Esigodini in 1941 and the old buildings taken over by the Matopos Research Station where cattle breeding is researched.

Beginning in the 2010s, efforts have been make to exploit the native wildlife via ecotourism.

== Transport and communication ==
Tsholotsho District is connected to Bulawayo by a road that passes through Nyamandlovu. This road serves as the main transport link between the district and Zimbabwe’s second-largest city. In recent years the road has deteriorated significantly, leading to longer travel times and higher vehicle maintenance costs. Community groups and government authorities have launched rehabilitation efforts to improve the route.

Secondary roads link Tsholotsho Business Centre to other destinations, including the Bulawayo – Victoria Falls highway and routes towards Plumtree. Many of the district’s secondary roads are affected by the Kalahari sands that cover large parts of the area, which can make travel difficult, particularly during the rainy season.

== Government and politics ==
Tsholotsho is a well known "battle ground" of Zimbabwean politics with the latest event being the so-called Tsholotsho Declaration of 2005 involving leading ZANU-PF members and Jonathan Moyo, in which they were accused of mooting a boardroom removal of President Mugabe. It was the location of a mass killing in 1983, as part of Robert Mugabe's "Gukurahundi". Moyo, who twice served as lnformation Minister in the ZANU-PF government, was elected as an Independent MP for Tsholotsho in 2005. The first MP of the area between 1980 and 1985 was John Nkomo who represented one part of the district that was combined with Bulawayo's Luveve Constituency while David Kwidini represented another part that was combined with the neighbouring Wankie District. Between 1985 and 1990 the district was represented by Amos Mkwananzi. Cain Mathema was the last Zanu PF MP before the advent of the MDC from 1990 to 2000. Cain Mathema lost the seat to MDC's Mtoliki Sibanda in 2000. The district was then divided into two constituencies of Tsholotsho South and North with Moyo (independent) narrowly retaining the latter while Maxwell Dube of the MDC winning the former in the 2008 harmonised elections. In 2013 Rosemary Sipepa Nkomo of MDC beat Moyo to become the new MP for Tsholotsho North only to lose it two years later when the MDC suffered a split. Tsholotsho South went Madodana Sibanda of Zanu PF while Moyo bounced back as Tsholotsho North MP (this time as a Zanu PF candidate) in a by-election boycotted by all major parties in 2015.

== Notable people ==
- NoViolet Bulawayo – award-winning writer, author of We Need New Names
- Joel Luphahla – former Zimbabwe international player, who played for many top football teams such as Madona Rollers fc Highlanders FC, Supersport United, Platinum Stars, Tsholotsho FC
- Mkhululi Chimoio – an investigative journalist from Mvundlana Line who in 2014 was charged with Treason, Undermining Authority of the Presidency, Sabotage and Subversion in absentia by the regime of President Robert Mugabe after being framed by rogue ZanuPF members as "Baba Jukwa" – a faceless social media whistle blower that exposed Mugabe's evil deeds
- Cain Mathema – former MP for Tsholotsho and current minister of home affairs and cultural heritage
- Jonathan Moyo – former MP and minister of information and education
- John Landa Nkomo – late former vice president of Zimbabwe and ZanuPF
- Musa Ncube - Tsholotsho South MP and Deputy Minister of Housing and Amenities.
- Zinjaziyamluma – the first singer of umaskandi ft South African singers such as Bonakele and many more
