= Karunatilaka =

Karunatilaka (Sinhala: කරුණාතිලක) is a Sinhalese surname. Notable people with the surname include:

- Harindra Karunatilaka, Sri Lankan researcher
- Shehan Karunatilaka (born 1975), Sri Lankan writer
