= Blood and Roses (disambiguation) =

Blood and Roses is a 1960 Roger Vadim film involving vampirism.

Blood and Roses also may refer to:

- Blood and Roses (book), related to the Wars of the Roses, by Helen Castor and based on 15th-century letters
- "Blood and Roses" (song) by The Smithereens
