= Hitting Budapest =

"Hitting Budapest" is a short story by Zimbabwean author NoViolet Bulawayo, first published in the Boston Review in November/December 2010. The story achieved significant international acclaim by winning the 2011 Caine Prize for African Writing and later served as the opening chapter of Bulawayo's debut novel, We Need New Names. In 2025, to mark the 25th anniversary of the Caine Prize, the story was awarded the Best of Caine special award, recognizing it as the most outstanding winning story in the prize's history.

== Plot summary ==
The story is narrated by Darling, a ten-year-old girl living in the ironically named, poverty-stricken shantytown of Paradise in Zimbabwe. Darling and her five friends—Bastard, Chipo, Godknows, Sbho, and Stina—embark on a clandestine journey to a nearby affluent neighborhood they call Budapest to steal guavas. Their motive is simple: profound hunger.

Budapest is depicted as a land of stark, almost foreign, contrast: big houses, well-maintained gardens, and fruit-heavy trees whose bounty no one seems to need. The children's adventure is marked by moments of childish playfulness and harsh reality. The narrator offhandedly mentions that one of the girls, Chipo, is pregnant, having been impregnated by her grandfather—a detail that underscores the brutal normality of their lives. During their raid, they briefly encounter an expatriate woman whose polite, oblivious behavior and act of discarding food highlight the vast social and economic divide.

The story ends as the children make their triumphant escape, "running and laughing and laughing and laughing," a moment that captures both the resilience of their childhood bond and their temporary victory over deprivation.
