= NoViolet Bulawayo =

Zimbabwean author (born 1981)

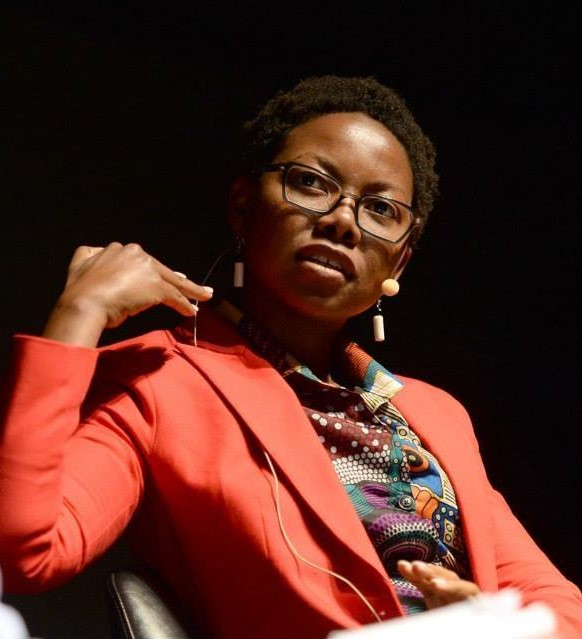
- Born: Elizabeth Zandile Tshele; 10 December 1981 (age 44); Tsholotsho, Zimbabwe
- Education: Njube High School; Mzilikazi High School; Texas A&M University-Commerce (BA); Southern Methodist University (MA); Cornell University (MFA)
- Writing career
- Language: English
- Genres: Short story; novel
- Notable works: We Need New Names (2013); Glory (2022)
- Notable awards: Caine Prize for African Writing; Man Booker Prize shortlist
- Website: novioletbulawayo.com

NoViolet Bulawayo is the pen name of Elizabeth Zandile Tshele (born 12 October 1981), a Zimbabwean author. In 2012, the National Book Foundation named her a "5 Under 35" honoree. She was named one of the Top 100 most influential Africans by New African magazine in 2014. Her debut novel, We Need New Names, was shortlisted for the 2013 Booker Prize, and her second novel, Glory, was shortlisted for the 2022 Booker Prize, making her "the first Black African woman to appear on the Booker list twice".

== Life ==
Bulawayo was born in Tsholotsho, Zimbabwe, and attended Njube High School and later Mzilikazi High School for her A-levels. She completed her college education in the United States, studying at Kalamazoo Valley Community College, and earning bachelor's and master's degrees in English from Texas A&M University-Commerce and Southern Methodist University, respectively. In 2010, she completed a Master of Fine Arts in creative writing at Cornell University, where her work was recognized with a Truman Capote Fellowship.

In 2011, she won the Caine Prize with her story "Hitting Budapest", which had been published in the November/December 2010 issue of the Boston Review and became the opening chapter of her 2013 debut novel. We Need New Names was included in the 2013 Man Booker Prize shortlist, making Bulawayo the first black African woman and the first Zimbabwean to be shortlisted for the prize. She also won the Etisalat Prize for Literature and the Hemingway Foundation/PEN Award, among other accolades.

In 2011, it was reported that she had begun work on a memoir project. Bulawayo sat on the board of trustees of the pan-African literary initiative Writivism between 2014 and 2018.

Published in 2022, her second novel Glory – inspired by George Orwell's Animal Farm and about a nation on the cusp of revolution – was written over more than three years, during which Bulawayo "closely followed the grass roots activism demanding change in countries including Sudan, Algeria, Uganda, Eswatini and the United States, where the Black Lives Matter movement surged." Glory was described by The Conversation as "unforgettable" and "an instant Zimbabwean classic". Reviewing the novel for The Guardian, Sarah Ladipo Manyika concluded: "Bulawayo doesn't hold back in speaking truth to power. She writes urgently and courageously, holding up a mirror both to contemporary Zimbabwe and the world at large. Her fearless and innovative chronicling of politically repressive times calls to mind other great storytellers such as Herta Müller, Elif Shafak and Zimbabwean compatriot Yvonne Vera. Glory, with a flicker of hope at its end, is allegory, satire and fairytale rolled into one mighty punch." Glory was shortlisted for the 2022 Booker Prize and longlisted for the 2023 Women's Prize for Fiction.

In 2025, to mark the 25th anniversary of the Caine Prize for African Writing, Bulawayo's her story "Hitting Budapest" was chosen for the honorary "Best of Caine" award, selected by a judging panel comprising Abdulrazak Gurnah (chair), Jennifer Nansubuga Makumbi and film producer Tony Tagoe.

== Pen name ==
NoViolet Bulawayo's pen name is derived from the Ndebele word for 'with', the name of her late mother and the city of Bulawayo.

== Awards and honours ==
- 2010: Truman Capote Fellowship
- 2011: Caine Prize for the short story "Hitting Budapest" about a gang of street children in a Zimbabwean shantytown.
- 2012–2014: Stegner Fellow at Stanford University
- 2013: Man Booker Prize shortlist for We Need New Names
- 2013: National Book Award's "5 Under 35" chosen by a panel of past finalists and winners. Bulawayo was selected by Junot Díaz.
- 2013: Guardian First Book Award shortlist for We Need New Names
- 2013: Barnes & Noble Discover Award finalist for We Need New Names
- 2013: Etisalat Prize for Literature winner for We Need New Names
- 2013: Los Angeles Times Book Prize Art Seidenbaum Award for First Fiction, winner for We Need New Names.
- 2014: PEN/Hemingway Award for Debut Novel winner for We Need New Names
- 2014: Betty Trask Award winner for We Need New Names
- 2022: Booker Prize shortlist for Glory
- 2023: Women's Prize for Fiction longlist for Glory
- 2025: Best of Caine award for "Hitting Budapest"

== Works ==
- 2009: "Snapshots", published in New Writing from Africa 2009 (J. M. Coetzee, ed.)
- 2010: "Hitting Budapest", published in Boston Review and The Caine Prize for African Writing 2011
- 2013: We Need New Names
- 2022: Glory
