= Alain Mabanckou =

Congolese writer (born 1966)

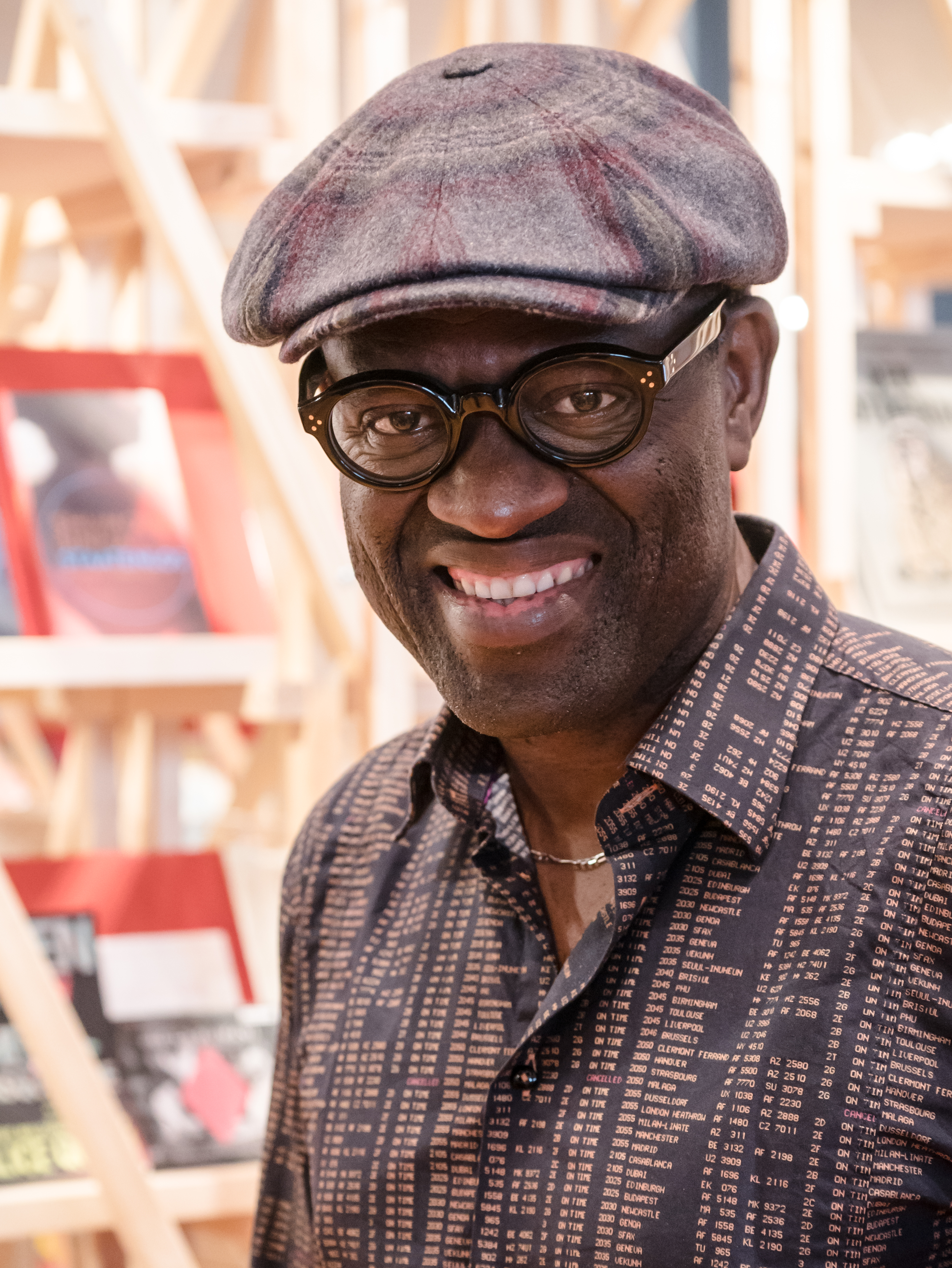
- Mabanckou at the Frankfurt Book Fair 2017
- Born: 24 February 1966 (age 60); Congo-Brazzaville
- Citizenship: French
- Education: Marien Ngouabi University; Université Paris-Dauphine
- Occupations: Novelist, journalist, poet, and academic
- Website: alainmabanckou.com

Alain Mabanckou (born 24 February 1966) is a novelist, journalist, poet, and academic, a French citizen born in the Republic of the Congo, he is currently a Professor of Literature at UCLA. He is best known for his novels and non-fiction writing depicting the experience of contemporary Africa and the African diaspora in France, including Broken Glass (2005) and the Prix Renaudot-winning Memoirs of a Porcupine (2006). He is among the best known and most successful writers in the French language, and one of the best known African writers in France. In some circles in Paris he is known as "the Samuel Beckett of Africa".

Mabanckou is also controversial, and has been criticized by some African and diaspora writers for stating that Africans bear responsibility for their own misfortune. He has argued against the idea that African and Caribbean writers should focus on their local realities in order to serve and express their communities. He further contends that categories such as nation, race, and territory fall short of encapsulating reality, and urges writers to create works that deal with issues beyond these subjects.

== Life ==
Alain Mabanckou was born in Congo-Brazzaville in 1966. He spent his childhood in the coastal city of Pointe-Noire, where he received his baccalaureate in Letters and Philosophy at the Lycée Karl Marx. After preliminary law classes at the Marien Ngouabi University in Brazzaville, he received a scholarship to go to France at the age of 22. He already had several manuscripts to his name, mostly collections of poems, which he began publishing three years later.

After receiving a post-graduate Diploma in Law from the Université Paris-Dauphine, he worked for about ten years for the group Suez-Lyonnaise des Eaux.

=== Writing ===
Mabanckou dedicated himself increasingly to writing after the publication of his first novel, Bleu-Blanc-Rouge (Blue-White-Red), which won him the Grand prix littéraire d'Afrique noire in 1999. Since then he has continued to regularly publish prose as well as poetry. His African Psycho (2003) is a novel written from the point of view of Gregoire Nakobomayo, a fictional African serial killer.

Mabanckou is best known for his fiction, notably Verre cassé (Broken Glass), a comic novel centred on a Congolese former teacher and life in the bar he now frequents. Verre cassé has also been the subject of several theatrical adaptations. It was published in English translation as Broken Glass in 2009.

In 2006, he published Memoires de porc-épic (Memoirs of a Porcupine), which won the Prix Renaudot, one of the highest distinctions in French literature. The book is a magic realism-inspired reworking of a folk tale into a psychological portrait of Kibandi, a young Congolese man's descent into violence. The folk tale is an African legend: "All human beings have an animal double. Some doubles are benign, others wicked." This adage focuses on the value placed on twinhood in the African tradition. Just as the text uses the notion of doubles as a key idea in the development of its theme of power and sacrifice, African tribes believe twins to be harbingers of health and prosperity in a family. However, they can also bring the opposite in disaster, and misfortune. There also exists a power dynamic between twins in that the second-born undertakes the more subservient role of guide that introduces the firstborn to the world. These two notions of duality and power dynamics come through in the characters, and their doubles, in the novel. The novel is narrated by one of these doubles, a porcupine, who is telling a baobab tree of the years he spent with Kibandi, his "master," establishing his subservient role. On Kibandi's tenth birthday, his father makes him drink mayamvumbi, a potion, that links Kibandi to his "harmful double," the porcupine, for life, an instance of twinhood bringing misfortune. After the two carry out a string of murders in their village, even once violating the basic principle of Congolese magic of never harming twins, given their sacred place in tradition, Kibandi dies and the porcupine remains alive, and turns to the baobab to tell his story. During his confessions, the porcupine makes frequent, often poignant remarks on humanity, such as the endangering relationship between humans and animals and the sometimes exploitative role of ethnographers, all while staying true to authentic African traditions of storytelling, and twinhood.

In 2007, Mabanckou's early poetry was re-published by Points-Seuil under the title Tant que les arbres s'enracineront dans la terre, as well as a biography of James Baldwin, Lettre à Jimmy (Fayard), on the 20th anniversary of Baldwin's death.

Mabanckou's 2009 novel, Black Bazar, is a dark comic story set in Jip's, a Paris Afro-Cuban bar once frequented by Mabanckou, portraying the lives of characters from the various African diasporas of France.

Mabanckou's work has been translated and published in 15 languages, including several books in English.

=== Academic ===
In 2002, Mabanckou went to teach Francophone Literature at the University of Michigan as an assistant professor. After three years there he was hired in 2006 by the University of California Los Angeles, where he is now a full professor in the French Department. He currently lives in Santa Monica, California. He was appointed visiting professor at the Collège de France (Chair of Artistic Creation) for 2016.

=== Other work ===
Mabanckou was a judge of the 2022 Booker Prize, together with Neil MacGregor (chair), Shahidha Bari, Helen Castor and M. John Harrison.

Mabanckou is the founder of the musical project Black Bazar.

== Bibliography ==
=== Novels ===
- Bleu-Blanc-Rouge (Présence Africaine, 1998). Blue White Red, trans. Alison Dundy (Indiana University Press, 2013)
- Et Dieu seul sait comment je dors (Présence Africaine, 2001)
- Les Petits-fils nègres de Vercingétorix (Le Serpent à Plumes, 2002). The Negro Grandsons of Vercingetorix, trans. Bill Johnston (Indiana University Press, 2019)
- African Psycho (Le Serpent à Plumes, 2003). African Psycho, trans. Christine Schwartz Hartley (New York: Soft Skull, 2007; London: Serpent's Tail, 2009)
- Verre cassé (Seuil, 2005). Broken Glass, trans. Helen Stevenson (Serpent's Tail, 2009)
- Mémoires de porc-épic (Seuil, 2006). Memoirs of a Porcupine, trans. Helen Stevenson (Serpent's Tail, 2011)
- Black Bazar (Seuil, 2009). Black Bazaar, trans. Sarah Ardizzone (Serpent's Tail, 2012)
- Demain j'aurai vingt ans (Gallimard, 2010). Tomorrow I'll Be Twenty, trans. Helen Stevenson (Serpent's Tail, 2013)
- Tais-toi et meurs (La Branche, 2012)
- Lumières de Pointe-Noire (Seuil, 2013). The Lights of Pointe-Noire, trans. Helen Stevenson (Serpent's Tail, 2015; New York: The New Press, 2016)
- Petit Piment (Seuil, 2015). Black Moses, trans. Helen Stevenson (Serpent's Tail / The New Press, 2017)
- Les Cigognes sont immortelles (Seuil, 2018). The Death of Comrade President, trans. Helen Stevenson (Serpent's Tail / The New Press, 2020)
- Le Commerce des Allongés (Seuil, 2022). Dealing with the Dead, trans. Helen Stevenson (Serpent's Tail / The New Press, 2025)

=== Poetry ===
- Au jour le jour (Maison rhodanienne de poésie, 1993)
- La légende de l'errance (Éditions L'Harmattan, 1995)
- L'usure des lendemains (Nouvelles du Sud, 1995)
- Les arbres aussi versent des larmes (L'Harmattan, 1997)
- Quand le coq annoncera l'aube d'un autre jour (L'Harmattan, 1999)
- Tant que les arbres s'enracineront dans la terre (Seuil, 2007)
- Congo (Mémoire d'encrier, 2016)
- As Long As Trees Take Root in the Earth and Other Poems, trans. Nancy Naomi Carlson (Seagull Books, 2021)

=== Essays ===
- Lettre à Jimmy (James Baldwin) (Fayard, 2007). Letter to Jimmy, trans. Sara Meli Ansari (New York: Soft Skull, 2014)
- L'Europe vue d'Afrique (Editions Naïve, 2009)
- Ecrivain et Oiseau migrateur (Editions André Versailles, 2011)
- Le Sanglot de l'homme noir (Fayard, 2012). The Tears of the Black Man, trans. Dominic Thomas (2018)
- Lettres noires : des ténèbres à la lumière (Fayard / Collège de France, 2015)
- Le monde est mon langage (Grasset, 2016)
- Penser et écrire l'Afrique (Seuil, 2017)
- Dictionnaire enjoué des cultures africaines (with Abdourahman A. Waberi) (Fayard, 2019)
- Rumeurs d'Amérique (Plon, 2020)

=== Illustrated books ===
- L'Enterrement de ma mère (Kaléidoscope, 2000)
- Ma Sœur-Étoile, illustrated by Judith Gueyfier (Seuil-Jeunesse, 2010)
- Le Coq solitaire, illustrated by Yuna Troël (Seuil-Jeunesse, 2019)

== Awards and recognition ==
- Prix de la Société des poètes français, 1995 for L'usure des lendemains
- Grand prix littéraire d'Afrique noire, for Bleu-Blanc-Rouge, 1999
- Prix du roman Ouest-France-Etonnants Voyageurs 2005, for Verre cassé
- Prix des cinq continents de la francophonie 2005, for Verre cassé
- Prix RFO du livre 2005, for Verre cassé
- Prix Renaudot 2006, for Mémoires de porc-épic
- Prix de La Rentrée littéraire 2006, for Mémoires de porc-épic
- Prix Aliénor d'Aquitaine 2006, for Mémoires de porc-épic
- Prix Créateurs Sans Frontières 2007 (Ministère français des Affaires Etrangères), for Mémoires de porc-épic
- Médaille de citoyen d'honneur de la ville de Saint-Jean-d'Angély (Charente-Maritime, France), 2004
- Chevalier de la Légion d'honneur par décret du Président de la République française, 2010.
- Georges Brassens Prize 2010, for Demain j'aurai vingt ans
- Prix Prince Pierre de Monaco 2013, Littérature
- Académie Française Prize: Grand Prix de littérature Henri Gal 2012 for his entire work
- Premio Strega Europeo: 2015, Finalist
- Man Booker International Prize: 2015, Finalist
- 2016: Puterbaugh Fellow for the entire body of work
- 2017: Man Booker International Prize selection for the novel Black Moses
- The Guardian ranked Broken Glass number 99 in its list of 100 Best Books of the 21st Century.
- 2021: Elected a Royal Society of Literature International Writer
