= Glory (Bulawayo novel) =

2022 political satire by NoViolet Bulawayo

- First edition (US)
- Author: NoViolet Bulawayo
- Language: English
- Genre: Literary fiction, Political satire
- Set in: Jidada (fictionalised version of Zimbabwe)
- Publisher: Viking Press (US); Hamish Hamilton (UK)
- Publication date: 8 March 2022
- Publication place: Zimbabwe
- Pages: 416
- ISBN: 978-0-52-556113-2
- Preceded by: We Need New Names

Glory is the second novel of Zimbabwean author NoViolet Bulawayo. Published on 8 March 2022, Glory is a political satire inspired by George Orwell's novel Animal Farm. It was shortlisted for the 2022 Booker Prize, which was announced on 6 September 2022.

== Development and background ==
The novel was inspired by Animal Farm by George Orwell. According to Bulawayo, she intended to write about the 2017 coup against Robert Mugabe as a nonfiction; instead, she settled for political satire. Although set in an allegorical stand-in for Zimbabwe named Jidada, in the novel, the main character's mother, Simiso, is affected by her memories of the Gukurahundi, the historical genocide that occurred in Zimbabwe in the 1980s.

== Reception ==
While shortlisting Glory for the 2022 Booker Prize, the jury said, "A fictional country of animals ruled by a tyrannical and absolute power is on the verge of liberation. The fiction becomes almost reality as we picture the parallel between this Animal Farm, Zimbabwe, and the fate of many African nations. An ingenious and brilliant political fable that bears witness to the surreal turns of history."

Sarah Ladipo Manyika, writing for The Guardian, said Glory was in good company with Chronicles from the Land of the Happiest People on Earth by Wole Soyinka, and also observed: "Bulawayo doesn't hold back in speaking truth to power. She writes urgently and courageously, holding up a mirror both to contemporary Zimbabwe and the world at large. Her fearless and innovative chronicling of politically repressive times calls to mind other great storytellers such as Herta Müller, Elif Shafak and Zimbabwean compatriot Yvonne Vera. Glory, with a flicker of hope at its end, is allegory, satire and fairytale rolled into one mighty punch."

Glory was described by The Conversation as "unforgettable" and "an instant Zimbabwean classic". The New York Times stated: "The scope and complexity of the historical material Bulawayo takes on in her tale are ambitious, and she pulls it off."

Reviewing the novel for The Scotsman, Stuart Kelly wrote: "It is too neat to refer to this as a kind of Zimbabwean Animal Farm. ... If there were one book I would compare it to it would be Ngugi wa Thiong'o's Wizard of the Crow, an equally acerbic, precise, heart-rending and hilarious analysis of tyranny."

Ainehi Edoro comments very favourably in Brittle Paper on the novel's use of language – "Bulawayo's writing is a performance. Colorful, poetic, comedic. Like a masquerade, her writing dances in a blend of contrasts." – and also cautions that "before we start calling Glory African Animal Farm, I want to remind folks that Orwell did not invent the fable as a form of political critique. African literature has a rich tradition of animal stories."

The Financial Times reviewer wrote: "Glory is a memorable, funny and yet serious allegory about a country's plight under tyranny and what individual and collective freedom means in an age of virtual worlds and political soundbites."
