= Audrey Magee =

Irish novelist

- Born: Ireland
- Education: University College Dublin; Dublin City University
- Occupations: Novelist and journalist
- Website: audreymagee.com

Audrey Magee is an Irish novelist and journalist. Her debut novel, The Undertaking, was nominated for the Baileys Women's Prize for Fiction in 2014. Her novel The Colony was longlisted for the 2022 Booker Prize.

== Biography ==
Born in Ireland, Magee studied German and French at University College Dublin and journalism at Dublin City University. For 12 years, she worked as a journalist, writing for publications such as The Times, The Irish Times, The Observer, and The Guardian.

In 2014, Magee published The Undertaking, her debut novel. It was published by Atlantic Books. The novel is set in World War II-era Germany and "tells the story of Peter Faber, a German soldier fighting on the Eastern front, who marries Katharina Spinell, a woman he has never met, in order to escape the horrors of the battlefield for a few days."

She wrote The Undertaking with the goal of trying to understand "what it was like to have been an ordinary German during the Second World War." Magee took a "long time" to write the novel, as she "struggled with the novel's cruelty and indifference." To cope, she took walks and drank tea. A review of the novel in The New York Times said: "To write a story that doesn't allow for much sympathy, that keeps readers at a remove from the central characters, is one of the greatest challenges an author can undertake. That Magee succeeds as well as she does is impressive."

Magee lives in Wicklow with her husband and three daughters.

Her novel The Colony – which "follows two outsiders who travel to a small island off the west coast of Ireland in search of answers" – was longlisted for the 2022 Booker Prize.

== Awards ==
Year	Title	Award	Category	Result	Ref.
2014	The Undertaking	Baileys Women's Prize for Fiction	—	Shortlisted	
2014	The Undertaking	Irish Book Award	Newcomer	Nominated	
2014	The Undertaking	Waverton Good Read Award	—	Longlisted	
2015	The Undertaking	Walter Scott Prize	—	Longlisted	
2016	The Undertaking	International Dublin Literary Award	—	Longlisted	
2022	The Colony	Booker Prize	—	Longlisted	
2022	The Colony	Irish Book Award	Novel	Nominated	
2022	The Colony	Orwell Prize	Political Fiction	Shortlisted	
2023	The Colony	Kerry Group Irish Novel of the Year Award	—	Shortlisted	

== Bibliography ==
- —— (2014). The Undertaking (hardcover 1st ed.). London: Atlantic Books. ISBN 9781782391029.
- —— (2022). The Colony (hardcover 1st ed.). London: Faber & Faber. ISBN 9780571367597.
