= Karen Joy Fowler =

American writer

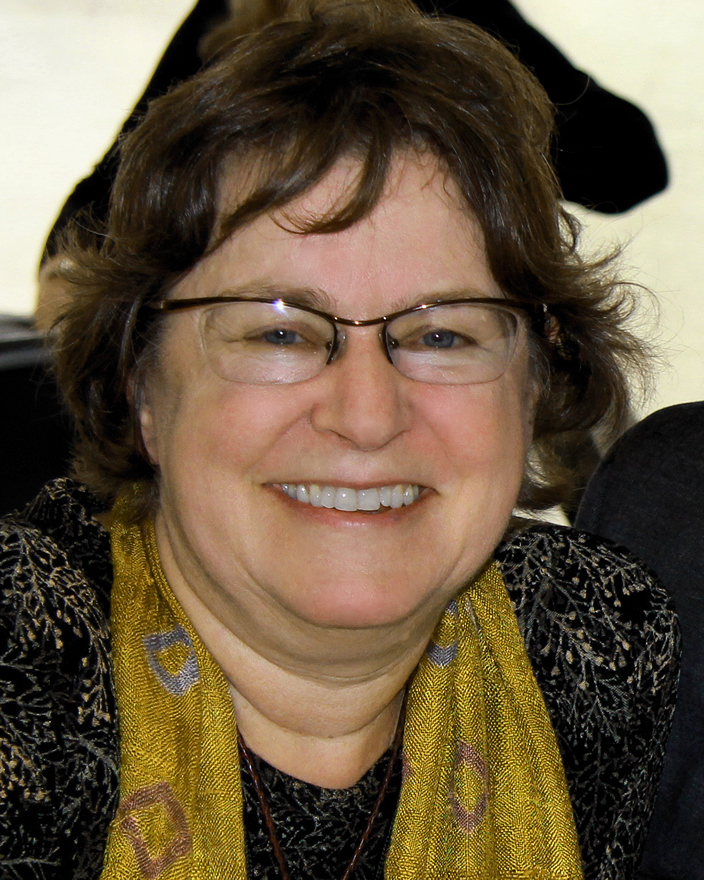
- Fowler at the 2013 Texas Book Festival.
- Born: February 7, 1950 (age 76); Bloomington, Indiana, U.S.
- Education: University of California, Berkeley; University of California, Davis
- Occupation: Author
- Children: 1
- Writing career
- Years active: 1985–present
- Notable work: The Jane Austen Book Club (2004)

Karen Joy Fowler is an American author of science fiction, fantasy, and literary fiction. Her work often centers on the nineteenth century, the lives of women, and social alienation.

She is best known as the author of the best-selling novel The Jane Austen Book Club (2004) that was adapted into a movie of the same name.

== Biography ==
Fowler was born February 7, 1950, in Bloomington, Indiana, and spent the first eleven years of her life there. Her family then moved to Palo Alto, California.

== Writing career ==
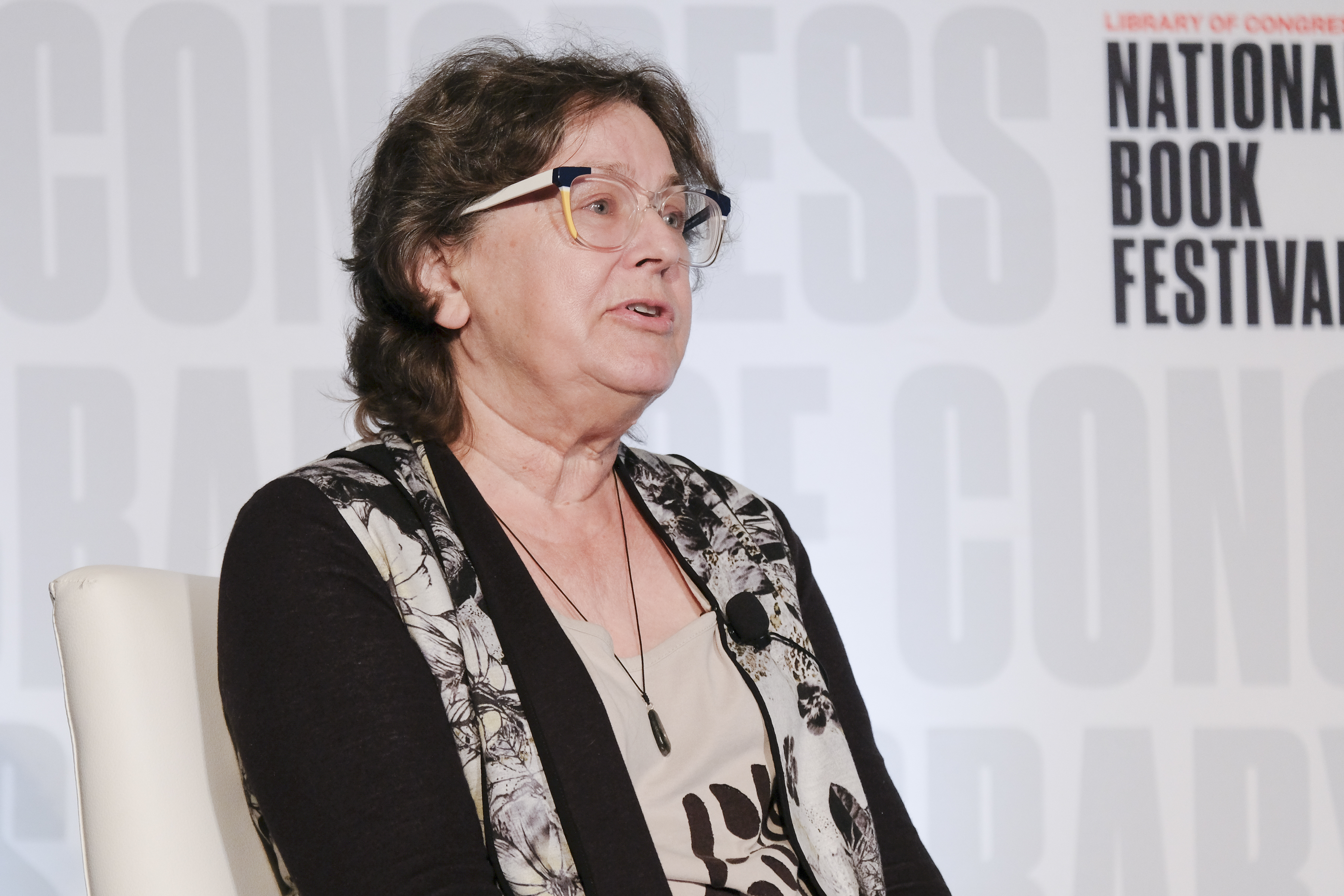
Fowler at the National Book Festival in 2022

Fowler's first novel, Sarah Canary (1991), was published to critical acclaim. The novel involves a group of people in the Pacific Northwest alienated by nineteenth century America experiencing a peculiar kind of first contact in 1873. One character is Chinese American, another putatively mentally ill, a third a feminist, and lastly Sarah herself, a mysterious woman who is actually an extraterrestrial. Fowler meant for Sarah Canary to "read like a science fiction novel to a science fiction reader" and "like a mainstream novel to a mainstream reader." Fowler's intention was to leave room for the readers' own interpretation of the text.

=== Otherwise Award ===
Fowler collaborated with Pat Murphy to found the James Tiptree, Jr. Award in 1991, a literary prize for science fiction or fantasy that "expands or explores our understanding of gender." The prize was named for science fiction author Alice Sheldon who wrote under the pen name James Tiptree Jr. The award's main focus is to recognize the authors, male or female, who challenge and reflect shifting gender roles. In 2019 it was renamed the Otherwise Award.

=== Instruction ===
Fowler served as president of the Clarion Foundation, which runs the Clarion Science Fiction & Fantasy Writers’ Workshop. She frequently teaches at the workshops. She was one of the two Guests of Honor at Readercon 2007.

=== Long-form works ===
Fowler's other genre works also tended to focus on odd corners of the nineteenth century experiencing the unexpected or fantastic. Her second novel, The Sweetheart Season (1996) is a romantic comedy infused with historical and fantasy elements.

Her 2004 novel The Jane Austen Book Club become a critical and popular success including being on The New York Times bestsellers list. Six members of an early 21st-century book club discuss Jane Austen books. Although it is not a science fiction or fantasy work, science fiction does play an integral part in the novel's plot.

In Wit's End, a young woman visits her godmother, one of America's most successful mystery writers.

Fowler's novel, We Are All Completely Beside Ourselves (2013), is told from the perspective of Rosemary, a college student, while attending University of California, Davis in her early twenties. She reflects on her early life in Indiana while the main events of the story unfold in the present. Raised by academic parents (including a father who is professor of behavioral psychology at Indiana University Bloomington) with her brother Lowell and a chimpanzee named Fern, Rosemary begins to discovery university secrets that relate to her past. When Fern, added to the family as part of a long-term research study, suddenly disappears, Lowell leaves home to search for her. The novel was a critical success, with contemporary authors and pundits acclaiming the narrative and writing style. It won the PEN/Faulkner Award for Fiction in 2014. It was also shortlisted for the 2014 Nebula Award and 2014 Man Booker Prize.

Fowler's novel, Booth, involves a family of Shakespearean actors best known for their connection to Lincoln's assassin John Wilkes Booth. It was longlisted for the 2022 Booker Prize.

=== Short story collections ===
Her 1998 collection, Black Glass, which has 15 short stories, 2 of which are original, won a World Fantasy Award, and her 2010 collection What I Didn't See, and Other Stories, containing 12 short stories with 1 original, also won a World Fantasy Award over two decades later.

==== "What I Didn't See" ====
Fowler was inspired to write her short story "What I Didn't See" after doing research about chimpanzees for her book We Are All Completely Beside Ourselves. During her research, Fowler came across an essay by Donna Haraway which discusses a 1920 expedition that was carried out by the curator of the New York National Museum of History. One of the men on the expedition wanted a woman in the group to kill a gorilla to ultimately protect these species. He reasoned that if women could carry out this action, gorillas would no longer be seen as a fearsome animal, and the thrill of killing them would be gone. Fowler's reaction was one of appalled interest, and she was inspired to write "What I Didn't See" by these findings. It won the short story Nebula Award in 2003.

== Awards and honors ==
In 2020 Fowler was recognized with a Life Achievement award at the World Fantasy Awards. She was a judge for the James Tiptree Jr. Memorial Award in 1997 and 2010 as well as the Ursula K. Le Guin Prize in 2023. In addition to the awards received, she has also been nominated for two Hugo Awards, eight Nebula Awards, three World Fantasy Awards, three Otherwise Awards, a John W. Campbell Memorial Award, a Philip K. Dick Award, three Shirley Jackson Awards, and two Theodore Sturgeon Memorial Awards.

- 1987 John W. Campbell Award for Best New Writer
- 1999 World Fantasy Award – collection for Black Glass
- 2004 Nebula Award – short story for "What I Didn't See"
- 2008 Nebula Award – short story for "Always"
- 2010 Shirley Jackson Award – short story for "The Pelican Bar"
- 2010 World Fantasy Award – short story for "The Pelican Bar"
- 2011 World Fantasy Award – collection for What I Didn't See, and Other Stories
- 2014 PEN/Faulkner Award for Fiction for We Are All Completely Beside Ourselves
- 2014 Man Booker Prize Shortlist for We Are All Completely Beside Ourselves
- 2014 Specsavers National Book Awards "International Author of the Year" winner for We Are All Completely Beside Ourselves
- 2022 Man Booker Prize Longlist for Booth, a novel

== Bibliography ==
=== Novels ===
- —— (1991). Sarah Canary. Henry Holt and Company.
- —— (1991). The War of the Roses. Pulphouse Publishing.
- —— (1996). The Sweetheart Season. Henry Holt and Company.
- —— (2001). Sister Noon. Putnam. ISBN 9780399147500.
- —— (2004). The Jane Austen Book Club. Putnam. ISBN 9780399151613.
- —— (2008). Wit's End. Putnam. ISBN 9780399154751.
- —— (2013). We Are All Completely Beside Ourselves. Marian Wood Books/Putnam. ISBN 9780399162091.
- —— (2022). Booth. Random House/Putnam. ISBN 9780593331439.

=== Collections ===
- —— (1986). Artificial Things. Bantam Books. ISBN 9780575083288.
- —— (1990). Peripheral Vision. Pulphouse Publishing.
- —— (1991). Letters from Home. The Women's Press. ISBN 0704342804.
- —— (1997). Black Glass. Putnam. ISBN 9780399175794.
- —— (2010). What I Didn't See and Other Stories. Small Beer Press. ISBN 9781931520683.
- —— (2013). The Science of Herself. PM Press. ISBN 9781604868258.

=== As editor ===
- —— (2003). MOTA 3: Courage.
- —— (2005). The James Tiptree Award Anthology 1. Tachyon Publications. ISBN 9781892391179.
- —— (2006). The James Tiptree Award Anthology 2. Tachyon Publications.
- —— (2007). The James Tiptree Award Anthology 3. Tachyon Publications.

Awards
Preceded by Kij Johnson	World Fantasy Award—Short Fiction winner 2010	Succeeded by Joyce Carol Oates
