= We Are All Completely Beside Ourselves =

2013 novel by Karen Joy Fowler

- Author: Karen Joy Fowler
- Audio read by: Orlagh Cassidy
- Language: English
- Published: Marian Wood Books
- Publication date: May 30, 2013
- Publication place: United States
- Media type: Print (hardcover), ebook, audiobook
- Pages: 320 pp
- Awards: PEN/Faulkner Award for Fiction (2014)
- ISBN: 9780399162091 (hardcover 1st ed)
- OCLC: 822532814
- Dewey Decimal: 813/.54
- LC Class: PS3556.O844 W4 2013

We Are All Completely Beside Ourselves is a 2013 novel by the American writer Karen Joy Fowler. The novel won the 2014 PEN/Faulkner Award for Fiction and was also shortlisted for the 2014 Man Booker Prize and the 2014 Nebula Award for Best Novel.

== Plot ==
Rosemary, while attending University of California, Davis in her early twenties, reflects on her early life in Indiana. She lived with her brother Lowell, mother, father, who is professor of behavioral psychology at Indiana University Bloomington, and a chimpanzee named Fern whom her parents have raised as a third child as part of a long-term scientific study. Rosemary's narration refers to Fern as a sister, and she is not revealed to be an ape until well into the novel. When Fern disappears one day, Lowell runs away from home in search of her. Rosemary also learns that her university has a secret that ties to her past, and as she learns more, she discovers a newfound connection with her family.

== Reception ==
Writing for The New York Times, Barbara Kingsolver says the "novel [is] so readably juicy and surreptitiously smart [that] it deserves all the attention it can get." Ron Charles, writing for The Washington Post, remarks that "Fowler manages to subsume any polemical motive within an unsettling, emotionally complex story." Maureen Corrigan, writing for NPR, says the novel is "witty but emotionally and intellectually riskier [than Fowler's previous novels]." In The Guardian, Liz Jenner wrote "Many a novel has devoted itself to exploring variations of Larkin's lament about what mums and dads do to their kids. But if any other book has done it as exhilaratingly as the achingly funny, deeply serious heart-breaker that is Fowler's 10th novel, and made it ring true for the whole of mankind, I've yet to read it. This is a moral comedy to shout about from the treetops."

== Awards ==
We Are All Completely Beside Ourselves was shortlisted for the 2014 Booker Prize and Nebula Award for Best Novel, and won the PEN/Faulkner Award for Fiction in the same year.

== See also ==
- B. F. Skinner
- Gua (chimpanzee)
