= Shehan Karunatilaka =

Sri Lankan writer (born 1975)

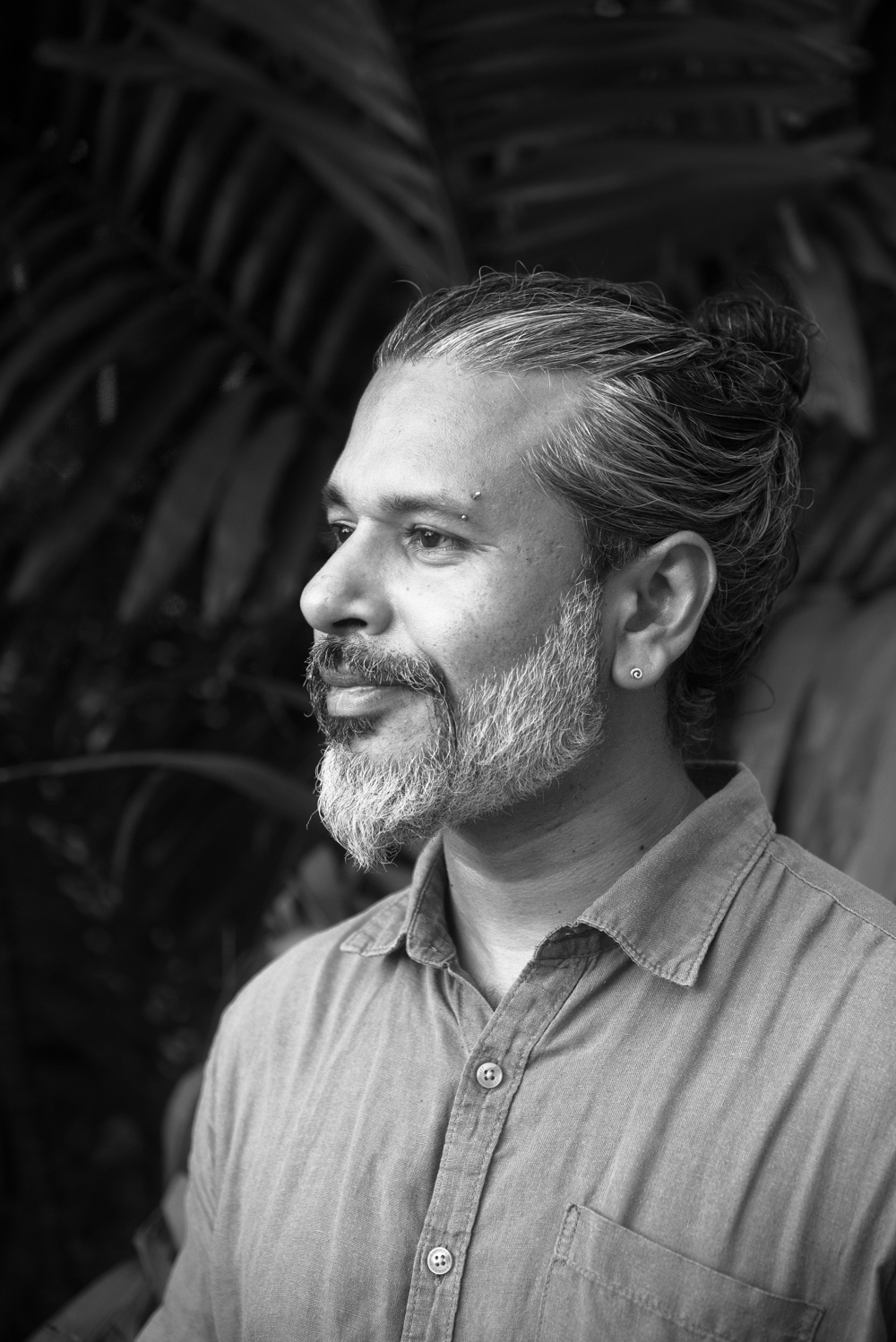
- Karunatilaka in 2020
- Born: 1975 (age 50–51); Galle, Sri Lanka
- Education: S. Thomas' Preparatory School; Whanganui Collegiate School; Massey University
- Occupations: Writer, Creative Director
- Writing career
- Period: 2000 – present
- Genres: Novels, children's books, short stories
- Subject: Sri Lankan society
- Notable works: Chinaman: The Legend of Pradeep Mathew (2010); The Seven Moons of Maali Almeida (2022)
- Notable awards: Gratiaen Prize (2008); Commonwealth Book Prize (2012); DSC Prize for South Asian Literature (2012); Booker Prize (2022)
- Website: www.shehanwriter.com

Shehan Karunatilaka (born 1975) is a Sri Lankan writer. He grew up in Colombo, studied in New Zealand and has lived and worked in London, Amsterdam and Singapore. His 2010 debut novel Chinaman: The Legend of Pradeep Mathew won the Commonwealth Book Prize, the DSC Prize, the Gratiaen Prize and was adjudged the second greatest cricket book of all time by Wisden. His second novel The Seven Moons of Maali Almeida (Sort of Books, 2022) won the 2022 Booker Prize.

== Biography ==
Shehan Karunatilaka was born in 1975 in Galle, southern Sri Lanka, and grew up in Colombo. He was educated at S. Thomas' Preparatory School, Kollupitiya, Sri Lanka, and then in New Zealand at Whanganui Collegiate School, and Massey University. He graduated in English literature, against his family's wish that he study business administration.

Before publishing his debut novel in 2010, he worked in advertising at McCann, Iris and BBDO, and has also written features for The Guardian, Newsweek, Rolling Stone, GQ, National Geographic, Conde Nast, Wisden, The Cricketer and the Economic Times. He has played bass with Sri Lankan rock bands Independent Square and Powercut Circus and the Brass Monkey Band.

== Novels ==
Karunatilaka's first manuscript, The Painter, was shortlisted for the Gratiaen Prize in 2000, but was never published.

=== Chinaman (2010) ===
His debut novel, Chinaman: The Legend of Pradeep Mathew (self-published in 2010), uses cricket as a device to write about Sri Lankan history. It tells the story of an alcoholic journalist's quest to track down a missing Sri Lankan cricketer of the 1980s.

==== Plot ====
Described as "part-tragedy, part-comedy, part-mystery and part-drunken-memoir", Chinaman is set in Sri Lanka in 1999, fresh after a world cup victory and in the throes of a civil war that will continue for another decade. Most of the action takes place "on Colombo's streets, at cricket matches, in strange houses and in dodgy bars."

The story's narrator is retired sports journalist WG Karunasena, who has done little with his 64 years, other than drink arrack and watch Sri Lankan cricket. When informed by doctors of his liver problems, WG decides to track down the greatest thing he has ever seen, Pradeep Mathew, left-arm spinner for Sri Lanka during the late 1980s.

==== Awards ====
The book was critically hailed, winning many awards. On 21 May 2012, Chinaman was announced as the regional winner for Asia of the Commonwealth Book Prize and went on to win the overall Commonwealth Book Prize announced on 8 June, when chair of judges Margaret Busby said: "This fabulously enjoyable read will keep you entertained and rooting for the protagonist until the very end, while delivering startling truths about cricket and about Sri Lanka." Chinaman also won the 2012 DSC Prize for South Asian Literature, and the 2008 Gratiaen Prize. Published to great acclaim in India and the UK, the book was one of the Waterstones 11 selected by British bookseller Waterstones as one of the top debuts of 2011 and was also shortlisted for the Shakti Bhatt First Book Prize.

In 2015, a Sinhala-language translation by Dileepa Abeysekara was published as Chinaman: Pradeep Mathewge Cricket Pravadaya.

In April 2019, the novel was voted among the best cricket books ever by Wisden.

=== The Seven Moons of Maali Almeida (2022) ===
Karunatilaka wrote his second novel in various versions with different titles. When the first draft was shortlisted for the Gratiaen Prize in 2015, it was titled Devil Dance. It was originally published in the Indian subcontinent as Chats with the Dead in 2020 by Penguin India. Karunatilaka struggled to find an international publisher for the novel because most deemed Sri Lankan politics "esoteric and confusing" and many felt "the mythology and worldbuilding was impenetrable, and difficult for Western readers." The independent British publishing house Sort of Books agreed to publish the novel after editing to "make it familiar to Western readers." Karunatilaka revised the work for two years due to its publication being delayed by the COVID-19 pandemic. Karunatilaka said, "I'd say it's the same book, but it benefits from two years of tightening and is much more accessible. It is a bit confusing to have the same book with two different titles, but I think the eventual play is that The Seven Moons of Maali Almeida will become the definitive title and text."

Published in August 2022 by Sort of Books, The Seven Moons of Maali Almeida won the 2022 Booker Prize, announced at a ceremony at The Roundhouse in London on 17 October 2022. The judges said that the novel "fizzes with energy, imagery and ideas against a broad, surreal vision of the Sri Lankan civil wars. Slyly, angrily comic." Charlie Connelly's review in The New European characterised the novel as "part ghost story, part whodunnit, part political satire ... a wonderful book about Sri Lanka, friendship, grief and the afterlife".

==== Plot ====
Set against the backdrop of the civil war, the story chronicles the challenges and ethical dilemmas of a war photographer tasked to solve his own murder mystery. It is a story of a ghost trapped navigating the afterlife and coming to terms with his life, his work, his relationships and his death.

Structured as a whodunit, the story follows renegade war photographer Maali Almeida, who is tasked with solving his own murder. Embroiled in red tape, memories of war, his own ethical dilemmas, and his awkward relationship with his mother, his official girlfriend and his secret boyfriend Maali is constantly interrupted by the overly chatty dead folks breezing through the afterlife, as he struggles to unravel his own death.

The author set the book in 1989, as this was when "The Tigers, The Army, The Indian peacekeepers, The JVP terrorists and State death squads were all killing each other at a prolific rate." A time of curfews, bombs, assassinations, abductions and mass graves seemed to the author to be "a perfect setting for a ghost story, a detective tale or a spy thriller. Or all three."

=== Children's books ===
Initially conceived as a story for his son, Please Don't Put That In Your Mouth (2019) marked the first formal collaboration between Shehan and his artist/illustrator brother, Lalith Karunatilaka, though Lalith had sketched the ball diagrams from Chinaman and the cover of Chats With The Dead.

Speaking to LiveMint, the author commented: "I have experienced many traumatic moments involving toddlers eating dangerous things. My daughter once mistook a wet paint brush for an ice cream and started licking it. My son is known to pick up dead insects and munch on them. I intended to write a cautionary tale, but silliness overtook it."

== Influences ==
In 2013, speaking to The Nation, Karunatilaka described his influences as: "Kurt Vonnegut, William Goldman, Salman Rushdie, Michael Ondaatje, Agatha Christie, Stephen King, Neil Gaiman, Tom Robbins and a few hundred others." He has additionally acknowledged Douglas Adams, George Saunders and Cormac McCarthy.

Karunatilaka has also written and spoken about his lifelong obsession with rock band The Police.

== Future projects ==
Karunatilaka is currently working on two more children's books, a short-story collection and hopes to begin a novel that "hopefully won't take 10 years."

It was speculated that his third novel, Khans, was set to be released by mid-2023.

== Bibliography ==
- Chinaman: The Legend of Pradeep Mathew (2010), novel ISBN 9788184002850
- Please Don't Put That In Your Mouth (2019), children's book ISBN 9789388874243
- Chats with the Dead (Penguin India, 2020), novel ISBN 9780670093298
- The Seven Moons of Maali Almeida (Sort of Books, 2022), novel ISBN 9781324064824
  - Las siete lunas de Maali Almeida (Plata) ISBN 9788492919390

== Awards and honours ==
- 2008: Gratiaen Prize, winner, Chinaman
- 2012: Commonwealth Book Prize, overall winner, Chinaman
- 2012: DSC Prize for South Asian Literature, overall winner, Chinaman
- 2022: Booker Prize, winner, The Seven Moons of Maali Almeida

=== Shortlists ===
- 2000: Gratiaen Prize Shortlist, The Painter (unpublished novel)
- 2008: Shakthi Bhatt Award, Chinaman: The Legend of Pradeep Mathew
- 2015: Gratiaen Prize Shortlist, Devil Dance (unpublished novel)
- 2017: Gratiaen Prize Shortlist, Short Eats (unpublished short stories)
- 2019: Wisden, Best Cricket Book Ever, 2nd, Chinaman
