= Black Bazar =

2009 novel by Alain Mabanckou

Black Bazar is a literary fiction novel written by Congolese novelist Alain Mabanckou and published in February 2009. It depicts post colonial Congo and is narrated a character known as Buttologist—a reference to his love for his love for buttocks.

In 2012, the novel was translated from French by Sarah Ardizzone. Jane Housham in a review for The Guardian called Black Bazar a "dazzling cultural catalogue." Adele King review that it was fun and easy to read.

== Themes ==
The novel incorporate themes such as colonialism, feminism, eroticism and luxury.
