= Treacle Walker =

2021 novel by Alan Garner

- Author: Alan Garner
- Publisher: Harper Collins
- Publication date: 2021

Treacle Walker is a book by Alan Garner published on October 28, 2021 by HarperCollins.

== Plot ==
The story is about a young boy Joseph Coppock who wears a patch over one eye to strengthen the vision in his other, weaker eye. From the old house he lives in, he watches the trains pass every day. He plays with his marbles, collects birds' eggs and reads comics.

One day, rag-and-bone man Treacle Walker appears who was exchanging donkey stone and an empty jar of all disease medicine for lamb's shoulder blades and a pair of Coppock's pajamas then, a mysterious friendship develops between them.

== Awards ==
- Shortlisted for 2022 Booker Prize
- Shortlisted for British Fantasy Award for Best Novella

== Critical reception ==
Sam Leith of The Daily Telegraph gave it five out of five ratings, Anna Robinson of The Conversation named it "best fiction of 2022", Shubhangi Tiwari of Scroll.in wrote: "Treacle Walker is a book as endearing as it is awe-inspiring, and a testament not only to the wisdom of age, but also to the power of attuning the novel to a space of possibility over truth." and Pauline Kim of The Michigan Daily wrote: "Alan Garner's Treacle Walker might just be the strangest book I've ever read.".

The book has been also reviewed by Susie Goldsbrough of The Times, Max Liu of i, Justine Jordan of The Guardian, Maureen Kincaid Speller of Strange Horizons, Alyssa Woo of The Straits Times, Alex Preston of The Guardian, Karthik Keramalu of The New Indian Express, Carolyne Larrington of The Times Literary Supplement, Simon Demetriou of Cyprus Mail and Felix Taylor of Literary Review.
