= Chinaman: The Legend of Pradeep Mathew =

2010 novel by Shehan Karunatilaka

- 2015 Sinhala translation cover
- Author: Shehan Karunatilaka
- Illustrator: Lalith Karunathilake
- Cover artist: Eranga Tennekoon
- Language: English
- Set in: Sri Lanka
- Publisher: Self-published
- Publication date: 2010
- Publication place: Sri Lanka
- Media type: Print
- Pages: 499
- Awards: 2008 Gratiaen Prize; 2012 DSC Prize for South Asian Literature; Commonwealth Book Prize
- ISBN: 9789555236003 (first edition)
- LC Class: MLCS 2010/01106 (P) PR9440.9.K378
- Followed by: Chats with the Dead / The Seven Moons of Maali Almeida

Chinaman: The Legend of Pradeep Mathew is a 2010 novel by Shehan Karunatilaka. Using cricket as a device to write about Sri Lankan society, the book tells the story of an alcoholic journalist's quest to track down a missing cricketer of the 1980s. The novel was critically hailed on publication, winning awards and much positive review coverage.

On 21 May 2012, Chinaman was announced as the regional winner for Asia of the Commonwealth Book Prize and went on to win the overall Commonwealth Book Prize announced on 8 June. It also won the 2012 DSC Prize for South Asian Literature, and the 2008 Gratiaen Prize. Published to great acclaim in India and the UK, the novel was among the Waterstones 11 selected by British bookseller Waterstones as one of the top debuts of 2011 and was also shortlisted for the Shakti Bhatt First Book Prize.

In April 2019, Chinaman was voted among the best cricket books ever by Wisden. In 2022, the novel was included on the "Big Jubilee Read" list of 70 books by Commonwealth authors, selected to celebrate the Platinum Jubilee of Elizabeth II.

== Plot ==
The novel is narrated in the first person by an alcoholic writer who sets out to reclaim the legacy of a bowler, Pradeep Mathew, while possibly also seeking to recover his own lost greatness. His search uncovers a world of thugs, alcohol, gambling, cheating and gamesmanship, along with lies, half-truths and national interests that may conflict with the truth. The narrator is unable to finish his book because of his drinking and personal failures, and others are left to complete his search for Mathew, whom he regards as the greatest bowler ever.

== Style ==
Karunatilaka has acknowledged a debt to Kurt Vonnegut in searching to find a narrative voice that is "wise, silly, funny and occasionally profound" and in the use of such innovations as "the short explanatory chapter and the non-sequitur illustration".

== Publication ==
After the manuscript of Chinaman won the 2008 Gratiaen Prize, Shehan Karunatilaka contacted local and international publishers to assist him in editing the novel but was unable to find anyone to perform the large structural edit that he felt the book needed. He chose to publish the book himself instead. Karunatilaka's wife, Eranga Tennekoon, created the book's cover, while his brother, Lalith Karunathilake, created the illustrations. Karunatilaka's friend Deshan Tennekoon completed the typesetting and font design, while screenwriter Ruwanthie de Chickera completed the structural edit for Chinaman. Michael Meyler completed line edits and Adam Smyth proofed the novel. The book was self-published in 2010, printed by Silverline Graphics and distributed through Perera Hussein Publishing House.

In 2011, Chiki Sarkar of Random House India bought Chinaman and helped Karunatilaka edit it, removing nearly 100 pages. With the cover art and font having been redone, the novel was published by Random House India and published internationally by Jonathan Cape, an imprint of Random House, in 2011.

In 2015, a Sinhala-language translation by Dileepa Abeysekera was published by Diogenes with the title Chinaman: Pradeep Mathewge Cricket Pravadaya.

== Reception ==
A review for The Guardian by Nicholas Lezard referenced the historical use in cricket of the term "chinaman" to describe "a particular delivery, a slower ball designed to fool the batsman into thinking it will bounce in the opposite direction to the one it does", and praised the book, writing of its style: "This long, languorous and winding novel has registers of tragedy, farce, laugh-out-loud humour and great grace." Tishani Doshi commented on the ways Karunatilaka "mixes humour and violence with the same deftness with which his protagonist mixes drinks."

The Independent's reviewer, Salil Tripathi, considered the book to be a contender for the "Great Sri Lankan Novel", as did Shashi Tharoor, who wrote: "Shehan Karunatilaka's extraordinary first novel is manifestly a work of genius—one that manages to be about Sri Lanka without being overtly about it, and seems to be about cricket but goes well beyond it."

Ludovic Hunter-Tilney of the Financial Times gave the novel a mixed review, noting: "The chronological structure darts around confusingly and there's an awkwardly tacked-on subplot about an English expat friend accused of pederasty"; however, he concluded that the novel's "free-wheeling, zany tempo is part of its charm too".

In January 2012, Chinaman won the DSC Prize for South Asian Literature, and in May 2012 was announced as the regional winner for Asia of the Commonwealth Book Prize, going on to be selected as the overall winner in June 2012, when chair of judges Margaret Busby said: "This fabulously enjoyable read will keep you entertained and rooting for the protagonist until the very end, while delivering startling truths about cricket and about Sri Lanka."

The novel was praised by The Cricket Monthly as "a cavorting read", and in April 2019, was voted among the best cricket books ever by Wisden.

Chinaman was included on the "Big Jubilee Read" list of 70 books selected by a panel of experts, and announced by the BBC and The Reading Agency in April 2022, in celebration of the Platinum Jubilee of Elizabeth II in June 2022.

== Awards and honours ==
- 2008: Gratiaen Prize, winner
- 2012: DSC Prize for South Asian Literature, overall winner
- 2012: Commonwealth Book Prize, overall winner
- 2022: Big Jubilee Read selection
