= Booth (novel) =

2022 novel by Karen Joy Fowler

- Author: Karen Joy Fowler
- Language: English
- Publisher: G.P. Putnam’s Sons
- Publication date: 2022
- Publication place: United States
- Pages: 470

Booth is a novel by Karen Joy Fowler, published in 2022. It is a historical novel about the family of John Wilkes Booth, the assassin of Abraham Lincoln.

Fowler wrote "I did not want to write a book about John Wilkes. This is a man who craved attention and has gotten too much of it; I didn't think he deserved mine. And yet there is no way around the fact that I wouldn't be writing about his family if he weren't who he was, if he hadn't done what he did."

== Plot summary ==
The novel starts in 1822 when British actor, Junius Brutus Booth and his partner migrate to the United States. They would have 10 children, 6 of whom survived to adulthood. It is told mostly from the points of view of three of the siblings, Rosalie, Asia and Edwin. There are also short chapters which show important moments in the life and career of Abraham Lincoln.

The novel follows the lives of the Booth siblings starting with their childhoods in rural Maryland, then still a slave holding state. Three of the sons, Junius, Edwin and John follow their father in becoming actors, and the story particularly follows the career of Edwin who goes on to become one of the most celebrated actors of his day. John's growing radicalisation during the Civil War is also shown through the eyes of his siblings.

The climax is the assassination of president Abraham Lincoln in 1865, by John Wilkes Booth. The novel follows the effect this has on the Booth family rather than the assassination itself.

== Reception ==
Booth was named on the longlist for the 2022 Booker Prize.
