= Free Thinking =

British radio programme

- Other names: Night Waves (1992–2014)
- Running time: 60 minutes
- Country of origin: United Kingdom
- Language: English
- Home station: BBC Radio 3 (1992–2024); BBC Radio 4 (2024–present)
- Hosted by: Various
- Original release: 15 September 1992 – present
- Audio format: Stereophonic sound
- Website: www.bbc.co.uk/programmes/b0144txn

Excerpt from an episode
Voice of Martin Amis, recorded April 2010

Free Thinking is a British radio programme broadcast on BBC Radio 4 every Friday night. It was previously broadcast on Radio 3 as part of its "After Dark" late night programming.

The programme is a rebranded version of Night Waves, "Radio 3's flagship arts and ideas programme" that had been broadcast since 1992. Night Waves was broadcast every Monday to Thursday evening, except during the Proms season. Radio 3 rebranded Night Waves as Free Thinking from 7 January 2014, and reduced the number of first-time broadcasts per week from four to three (plus one repeat). It had a 45 minute running time on Radio 3 (from 10pm-10:45pm). In April 2024, the show was moved to Radio 4 where it is transmitted just once a week, but with a 60 minute running time (from 9pm-10pm).

In October 2026, the BBC announced that Free Thinking would be ended, along with You and Yours.

== Format ==
Programmes usually included a mix of interviews, reviews, previews, discussions, commissioned writing and reports. Some episodes included a single interview with a prominent figure in the worlds of arts or ideas. The programme's presenters include Matthew Sweet, Philip Dodd, Rana Mitter, Shahidha Bari and Anne McElvoy.

== Reception ==
The Guardian said in May 2010: "...the king of radio arts programmes is undoubtedly Night Waves, a programme so clever that it regularly makes me stand still and listen, usually halfway to the dishwasher with a plate in my hand...It's the desire to untangle arguments, to lift up their corners and see what lurks there. There's a gleeful range of references too...and a relish for intelligent debate."
