= Selby Wynn Schwartz =

American author

- Occupation: Author
- Writing career
- Notable works: The Bodies of Others; After Sappho
- Notable awards: Rome Prize (2024)

Selby Wynn Schwartz is an American author.

She has worked as a dance scholar at Stanford University, focusing on female and transgender performance.

Her book The Bodies of Others: Drag Dances and Their Afterlives was a finalist for a 2020 Lambda Literary Award.

Her historical fiction novel After Sappho was longlisted for the 2022 Booker Prize.

In 2024 Schwartz was awarded the Rome Prize in Literature at the American Academy in Rome.
