= Blood and Roses (book) =

2004 book by Helen Castor

- First edition
- Author: Helen Castor
- Genre: Non-fiction
- Publisher: Faber & Faber
- Publication date: 2004
- Media type: Print
- ISBN: 0-00-714808-9
- OCLC: 62330984
- Dewey Decimal: 942.04092/2 22
- LC Class: DA245 .C3687 2006

Blood and Roses: One family's struggle and triumph during the tumultuous Wars of the Roses, by Helen Castor, is a narrative history based on the Paston Letters of 15th-century England. The 2004 book traces five generations of the Pastons, an influential family from the Norfolk village of the same name. Based largely on an extensive collection of correspondence, Blood and Roses records the competition among the landed gentry for land, property and advancement. Set among the turbulence of the Wars of the Roses, the Pastons survive and thrive through shrewd political manoeuvres.

Castor extends the narrative and scope of this book beyond previous books of the same topic by recounting in parallel battles between the Yorkist and Lancastrian factions with how the war disrupted the lives of the Paston family.

Blood and Roses was long-listed for the BBC Samuel Johnson Prize for non-fiction in 2005. It was also awarded the Beatrice White Prize for outstanding scholarly work in the field of English literature before 1590, by the English Association in 2006.
