= Sarah Ladipo Manyika =

British-Nigerian writer

Sarah Ladipo Manyika FRSL
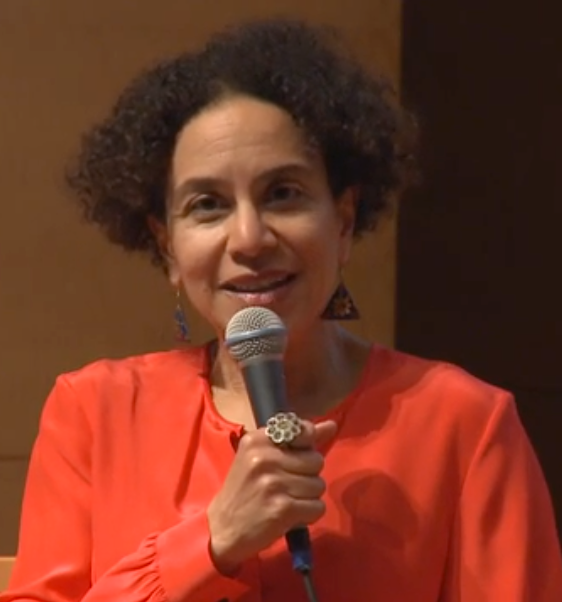
- In a discussion at the San Francisco Public Library in 2023
- Born: Nigeria
- Citizenship: United Kingdom
- Education: University of Birmingham; University of Bordeaux; University of California, Berkeley
- Spouse: James Manyika (m. 1994)
- Writing career
- Notable works: In Dependence (2008); Like A Mule Bringing Ice Cream To The Sun (2016)
- Website: sarahladipomanyika.com

Sarah Ladipo Manyika FRSL is a British-Nigerian writer. She is the author of the novels In Dependence (2009) and Like A Mule Bringing Ice Cream To The Sun (2016). Her articles have appeared in publications including Granta, Transition, Guernica, and OZY, which she served as founding books editor. Manyika's work also features in the 2019 anthology New Daughters of Africa edited by Margaret Busby.

== Early life ==
Manyika was born and raised in Nigeria. She has lived in Kenya, France, Zimbabwe, United States, and Britain. Her father is Nigerian and her mother is British.

== Career ==
Manyika studied at the Universities of Birmingham (UK), Bordeaux (France), and California (Berkeley), receiving a PhD from the latter.

=== Fiction ===
Manyika's short story "Mr Wonder" appeared in the 2008 collection Women Writing Zimbabwe. Her first novel, In Dependence, was originally published by Legend Press, London, in 2008, and was chosen by the UK's largest bookstore chain as its featured book for Black History Month. In 2009, In Dependence, was published by Cassava Republic, a literary press based in Abuja, Nigeria (as well as, latterly, in the UK), with a stable of authors that includes Teju Cole and Helon Habila. Speaking of her decision to sign with an African publisher, Manyika has said: "I realized that by granting world rights to an African publisher I could, in a small way, attempt to address the imbalance of power in a world where the gatekeepers of literature, even for so-called African stories, remain firmly rooted in the west." Toni Kan writes in The Lagos Review: "Sarah Manyika has written an impressive debut novel which will find a well-deserved place in the pantheon of post-colonial literature." In 2014, In Dependence was published by Weaver Press in Zimbabwe, where it is a set book for the Advanced-level English Literature examination. In Dependence has also been introduced by the Joint Admissions and Matriculation Board (JAMB) in Nigeria for candidates sitting for the 2017 UTME. She was a finalist for a 2021 Audie Award for her narration of the novel.

Manyika's second novel, Like A Mule Bringing Ice Cream to the Sun, on its publication in spring 2016 was endorsed by many other writers, including Bernardine Evaristo ("Manyika's story about an elderly Nigerian woman is quiet, sophisticated and it expands the canon of contemporary African literature into welcome new territory"), Aminatta Forna ("gorgeous and finely crafted...Sarah Manyika's novel shows ordinary people at their best. Uplifting!"), NoViolet Bulawayo ("Astute, sensual, funny, and moving"), Jamal Mahjoub ("Manyika writes with great verve and gentle wit, illuminating her characters with subtle insight"), Peter Orner ("A beautiful, important new novel, and one that will continue to echo in a reader's mind for a long time after"), E. C. Osondu ("unforgettable...a powerful meditation on loss, memory, exile and loneliness. The characters in this novel will stay with you"), and Brian Chikwava ("A wonderfully constructed novel, always surprising"). It has been translated into several languages.

Like A Mule Bringing Ice Cream to the Sun was shortlisted in September 2016 for the Goldsmiths Prize (alongside books by Rachel Cusk, Deborah Levy, Eimear McBride, Mike McCormack and Anakana Schofield), "the first African novel to be considered for this prize", which was set up to reward fiction that breaks the mould or extends the possibilities of the novel form. The novel was also shortlisted for the California Book Award in the fiction category (alongside works by such writers as Andrew Sean Greer, Percival Everett, and Viet Thanh Nguyen). Of the genesis for Like a Mule Bringing Ice Cream to the Sun Manyika has said: "I've met many older women who have lived colourful lives, and yet when it comes to fiction I don't find many stories that mirror this, especially so when it comes to the lives of black women. When I cannot find stories that I'd like to read, I try writing them for myself." The novel's title is an acknowledged line from a poem by Mary Ruefle called "Donkey On".

Manyika is a contributor (with her short story "The Ambassador's Wife") to the 2019 anthology New Daughters of Africa, edited by Margaret Busby, participating in associated events.

=== Non-fiction ===
Manyika's non-fiction writing includes personal essays, book reviews, and in-depth profiles. For example, her essay "Coming of Age in the Time of the Hoodie" tells of her worries about raising her son in modern America. She has written book reviews for The Guardian, among them on Glory by NoViolet Bulawayo, and the New Statesman, such as on Hitting a Straight Lick with a Crooked Stick by Zora Neale Hurston. Her profile subjects include a piece on Toni Morrison for The Washington Post and Michelle Obama.

==== Between Starshine and Clay ====
Interviews with some of those from whom Manyika has drawn inspiration are the focus of her 2022 book Between Starshine and Clay: Conversations from the African Diaspora (Footnote Press), described as "a celebration of personal and collective stories, of histories, of people making a way where there seems to be no way, making a difference, making history." Its title, as Manyika explains, is borrowed from Lucille Clifton's poem "won't you celebrate me", which "speaks of survival through adversity and combines a blunt acknowledgement of how hard it is to survive, to forge one's own path, and yet to pull through and have something to celebrate." With a Foreword by Bernardine Evaristo, the book features activists, artists and intellectuals including Toni Morrison, Wole Soyinka, Michelle Obama, Cory Booker, Claudia Rankine, Henry Louis Gates Jr, Xoliswa Sithole, Anna Deavere Smith, Margaret Busby, Lord Michael Hastings and Evan Mawarire. Manyika has said that her search in "these turbulent times" for "answers, perspective, and hope" led her to write Between Starshine and Clay.

A Brittle Paper review stated: "All through the book, there is a powerful sense of history as these figures look back, take stock, reminisce about their lives and how they came to make the impact that they did. In the process of sharing their stories, they shed light on our moment." Olatoun Gabi-Williams writes of Manyika's book: "Her portraits of the chosen 12 are multi-media collages – richly hued stills in motion picture narratives. The guests tell their stories moving back and forth in time. Their stories are vivid: of dreams chased after; of full lives led – of purpose; of their struggles; disappointments and victories. ... In their own distinctive ways, each of them is leaving the world a far more hopeful place."

Among those who have praised Between Starshine and Clay are David Olusoga ("Each encounter framed and presented with enormous literary skill and grace. ...a snap-shot of where the peoples of the Black diaspora stand, today in the early 21st Century, and how much has been overcome to get here"), Delroy Lindo ("This is a one-of-a-kind book, a necessary and important one"), Ato Quayson ("A lesson in magic from Manyika's writing"), NoViolet Bulawayo ("Sarah Ladipo Manyika brings an intimate, eclectic, and delightfully startling freshness in this remarkably curated celebration of the African Diaspora") and Dame Vivian Hunt ("an amazing collection that will inspire readers young and old").

Between Starshine and Clay was selected by Brittle Paper literary magazine as one of the "100 Notable African Books of 2022".

=== Literary community ===
Manyika works with a number of organizations that support and amplify young writers and female voices. She is President of the Hedgebrook Board of Directors and on the Advisory Council of 826 Valencia. She previously served on the Board of the Museum of the African Diaspora (MoAD) in San Francisco and partnered with MoAD to host an interview series, Conversations across the Dispora, featuring conversations with authors, artists, philanthropists, and scholars. She additionally hosted OZY's video series, Write, and was the magazine's Books Editor. She has also served as a judge for literary competitions – the Etisalat Prize for Literature in 2014, the Goldsmiths Prize in 2020, and the Aspen Words Literary Prize in 2021.

== Personal life ==
She and her husband James Manyika married in Harare, Zimbabwe, in 1994.

== Awards and honours ==
In December 2022, Manyika was listed by New African as one of the 100 Most Influential Africans of the year. In 2023, she was elected a Fellow of the Royal Society of Literature.

== Works ==
=== Novels ===
- In Dependence (Legend Press, 2008; Cassava Republic Press, 2009)
- Like A Mule Bringing Ice Cream To The Sun (Cassava Republic Press, 2016, ISBN 978-1-911-11504-5).

=== Non-fiction ===
- Between Starshine and Clay: Conversations from the African Diaspora, Foreword by Bernardine Evaristo (Footnote Press, 2022)

=== Short stories ===
- "Mr Wonder" in Women Writing Zimbabwe (Weaver Press, 2008)
- "Modupe" in African Love Stories (Ayebia Clarke Publishing Ltd, 2006)
- "Girlfriend" in Fathers & Daughters (Ayebia Clarke Publishing Ltd, 2008)
- "The Ambassador's Wife" in Margaret Busby (editor), New Daughters of Africa: An International Anthology of Writing by Women of African Descent (Myriad Editions, 2019)

=== Book chapters ===
- "Oyinbo" in Prolematizing Blackness (Routledge, 2003)

=== Selected essays ===
- "Coming of Age in the Time of the Hoodie", Guernica, 23 June 2015.
- "Betting on Africa", Brittle Paper, 28 March 2016.
- "For the Love of Older Characters in Good Books", OZY, 29 October 2017.
- "Game of Tomes: The Struggle for Literary Prizes", OZY, 2 November 2017.
- "On Meeting Toni Morrison", Transition, No. 124, Writing Black Canadas (2017), pp. 138–147. Indiana University Press/Hutchins Center for African and African American Research at Harvard University.
- "What James Baldwin Means To Me", Brittle Paper, 4 March 2019.
- "On Meeting Mrs Obama", Granta 146: The Politics of Feeling, 22 March 2019.
- "On Meeting Margaret Busby", Granta, 19 October 2020.

=== Research reports ===
- Ph.D. Programs in African Universities: Current Status and Future Prospects. Report to the Rockefeller Foundation. Co-authored with David Szanton (University of Berkeley, California, 2002).

== See also ==
- Nigerian literature
