= In Dependence =

2008 novel by Sarah Ladipo Manyika

- Author: Sarah Ladipo Manyika
- Language: English
- Subject: Neo-colonialism
- Genre: Literary fiction
- Set in: Oxford; Nigeria
- Published: 2008
- Publisher: Legend Press, Cassava Republic
- Publication place: Nigeria
- Media type: Print (hardcover, paperback)
- ISBN: 978-1906558048

In Dependence is the 2008 debut novel written by British-Nigerian author Sarah Ladipo Manyika. Her first novel, it was originally published by Legend Press, London, in 2008.

== Plot ==
The story starts in the early 1960s, a young Tayo sails from Nigeria to England to pursue a scholarship at Oxford University. He sees himself as one of a generation filled with ideas of a new and better future in this city of dreaming spires. The globe seemed to be on fire with change: domestic independence, the Civil Rights movement, and the first tremors of cultural and sexual upheavals.

The love story begins when Tayo meets Vanessa Richardson, the lovely daughter of a retired officer, at this point. The story follows the heroic but bittersweet love story of Tayo and Vanessa. It is the narrative of two individuals trying to figure out who they are and who they want to be; it is a journey of romance and idealism, strength and deceit, and the universal yearning to fall madly and completely in love.

== Characters ==
Omotayo Oluwakayode Ajayi / TY - scholarship student at Oxford University.

Vanessa Richardson - The British lady with whom Tayo falls in love. Vanessa is also a student at Oxford.

Modupe - Tayo's teenage lover with whom he had an intensely physical relationship before leaving Nigeria for England.

Inspector Adeniyi Ajayi - Tayo's father.

Mrs Elizabeth Richardson - Vanessa's mother

Mr Jonathan Richardson - Vanessa's father

Bisi - Tayo's sister

Remi - Tayo's brother

Mr Edward Maximilian Barker - The one who welcomed Omotayo prior to the letter given to Tayo by Mr Faircliff.

Mrs Isabella Barker/Isabella - Wife of Mr Barker.

Uncle Bolu/Uncle B - Tayo’s uncle who loved drinking and women.

Miss Christine Arinze - Ex-girlfriend of Tayo and Ike. She read Modern Languages at St. Hilda College, Oxford.

Mr and Mrs Winter - They bailed Tunde, Tayo and Yusuf when they were arrested

Joy Williams - Yusuf's Nigerian wife.

Salamatou - A hairstylist in Dakar, Senegal.

Jean Luc - A Frenchman who had promised to marry Salamatou but ran away upon learning that she pregnant by him.

Miriam - Tayo's wife. She nursed Tayo's father and became pregnant for Tayo. They got married and gave birth to Kemi.

Kemi - Daughter of Tayo and Miriam.

Suleiman - Salamatou's son who was later adopted by Venessa

Abdou - Driver. He had taken Tayo to the airport before an accident occurred.

Danjuma - Gardener. He had a secret affair with Vanessa's mother while she was in Nigeria.

Professor John Harris - He is the man from the university whom Kemi introduced to his father.

== Background ==
According to Manyika, "she conducted a "huge amount" of research so as to convey the reality of living in Nigeria at that time, including reading back issues of local magazines and newspapers to capture the zeitgeist." In Dependence was first published in 2008 by Legend Press in London. In 2009, it was published by Cassava Republic in Nigeria. In 2014, In Dependence was published by Weaver Press in Zimbabwe, where it is a set book for the Advanced-level English Literature examination.

== Reception ==
Toni Kan writes in The Lagos Review: "Sarah Manyika has written an impressive debut novel which will find a well deserved place in the pantheon of post-colonial literature." In Dependence has also been introduced by the Joint Admissions and Matriculation Board (JAMB) in Nigeria for candidates sitting for the 2017 UTME. Bustle listed it as one of the five books by African authors during the #ReadAfricaWeek.

== Bibliography ==
- Sarah Ladipo Manyika (27 September 2008). In Dependence: A Novel. Legend Press. ISBN 978-1-90655-804-8.

== See also ==
- The Last Days at Forcados High School
