= The New World (British newspaper) =

British pro-European weekly since 2016

- Front page of issue 154 (from mid-2019)
- Type: Weekly newspaper
- Format: Compact
- Publisher: The New European Ltd
- Editor-in-chief: Matt Kelly
- Editor: Steve Anglesey
- Founded: 4 July 2016; 10 years ago
- Political alignment: Pro-Europeanism
- Language: English
- Headquarters: 22 Highbury Grove, London N5
- Country: United Kingdom
- Circulation: 33,000 weekly sales (UK)
- ISSN: 2398-8762
- Website: www.thenewworld.co.uk

The New World (formerly The New European) is a British pan-European weekly political and cultural newspaper and website. Launched in July 2016 as a response to the United Kingdom's 2016 EU referendum, its readership is aimed at those who voted to remain within the European Union, with the newspaper's original tagline being "The New Pop-up Paper for the 48%". Formerly owned by Archant, it was announced at the beginning of February 2021 that a consortium including founder Matt Kelly, media executive Mark Thompson and former Financial Times editor Lionel Barber had acquired the newspaper. After 9 years and 437 issues of what was intended to be a 4-week pop-up paper, on 5 June 2025, it was announced that The New European would re-brand as The New World.

== Newspaper ==
It was founded and edited for the first three-and-a-half years of its existence by Matt Kelly, who formerly worked at the Daily Mirror and Local World. Kelly was partially inspired in his idea by The European, a British weekly newspaper that was published from 1990 to 1998; hence the name The New European.

The newspaper's owners stated that The New European was to have an initial lifespan of just four issues, beyond which publication would be reviewed on a week-by-week basis. By the eve of the third edition the paper revealed it had broken even and sold around 40,000 copies. It continued to publish beyond its fourth issue, and claimed in July 2019 that it continued to be profitable. The circulation was reported in November 2016 to be "about 25,000" and, in February 2017, to be 20,000.

Alastair Campbell became the newspaper's editor-at-large in March 2017, months after it won the serial rights to the fifth volume of his diaries about the Blair government, which it serialised over three weeks.

The paper announced it was changing from Berliner to Compact format in July 2017.

In May 2018 the newspaper devoted a whole issue to feminism, rebranding as The New Feminist, edited by Caroline Criado Perez with contributions from Helen Lewis, Samira Ahmed, and Konnie Huq. On 29 March 2019, the date the UK was expected to leave the European Union under Theresa May, the newspaper devoted a whole edition to the writings of Will Self. The 25,000-word essay was illustrated by Martin Rowson.

In September 2019, Kelly announced he was promoting Jasper Copping, previously the paper's deputy editor, to the role of editor, while taking the role of publisher himself.

In February 2021 it was announced that a consortium including founder Matt Kelly, media executive Mark Thompson and former Financial Times editor Lionel Barber had bought the newspaper from Archant.

In July 2022, The New European Ltd completed a co-ownership scheme, raising more than £1m from more than 2,000 individual investors, who collectively own 16.7% of the company, valuing TNE Ltd at more than £6m ($7.2m).

== Digital ==
The paper announced in November 2016 that it was moving to become more digitally focused. In May 2017 it launched its first podcast which attracted between 10,000 and 15,000 listeners each week by 2019. The website, which combines contributions from the newspaper with unique online-only content, claimed to attract more than a million page views a month in 2017.

According to Press Gazette, as of September 2022, The New European website received just under 200,000 views a month, ranking it the 7th most popular political news brand in the UK.

== Reception ==
=== Awards ===
In March 2017, the Society of Editors awarded The New European the Chairman's award. In May 2017, The New European won prizes at the annual British Media Awards for Launch of the Year (Gold), Print Product of the Year (Silver) Content Team of the Year (Bronze) and Pioneer of the Year for the editor Matt Kelly. In July 2017, the Archant Group won the Professional Publishers Association Chairman's award, with the launch of The New European cited.

=== Criticism ===
In July 2016, just a week after the launch of the paper, a columnist in Vice News described The New European as a newspaper for the "sore loser" that is "not united by a love for Europe, but rather a disdain for the 52%".

In April 2017, The New European sent out a press release of its cover story titled "Skegness: The seaside town that Brexit could close down". In the press release it also mentioned that the story was "unlikely to go down well, locally, and there is an opportunity to stir up some controversy locally". The New European had claimed the press release had been sent out in error and issued another copy without the commentary. The Spectator ran a piece titled "The New European reveals its plan to troll Skegness". It said: "Although the pro-EU paper claims it is an advocate for unity and tolerance, it seems they hold no qualms about stirring up division in UK towns". The cartoon image on the cover of that issue was a play on the 1908 poster The Jolly Fisherman, originally commissioned by the Great Northern Railway, and received heavy criticism. The i reported that the people of Skegness were "hurt and offended" that the town's mascot, the Jolly Fisherman, had been "exploited" on the front cover of The New European magazine. In response to the feature, Matt Warman, the Conservative MP for Boston and Skegness, said that "Those who seek to make the European case anew would do better to try to understand than to insult either individuals or whole towns."

== Featured writers ==
- Alastair Campbell
- Charlie Connelly
- Bonnie Greer
- Will Self
