= We Need New Names =

2013 novel by NoViolet Bulawayo

- First edition (US)
- Author: NoViolet Bulawayo
- Language: English
- Genre: Bildungsroman
- Publisher: Reagan Arthur (US); Chatto & Windus (UK)
- Publication date: May 21, 2013 (US)
- Media type: Print, electronic
- Pages: 304
- ISBN: 9780316230810
- Followed by: Glory

We Need New Names is the 2013 debut novel of expatriate Zimbabwean writer NoViolet Bulawayo. A coming-of-age story, We Need New Names tells of the life of a young girl named Darling, first as a 10-year-old in Zimbabwe, navigating a world of chaos and degradation with her friends, and later as a teenager in the Midwestern United States, where a better future seems about to unfold when she goes to join an aunt working there.

The first chapter of the book, "Hitting Budapest", initially presented as a story in the Boston Review, won the 2011 Caine Prize for African Writing. The Chair of Judges, Hisham Matar, said: "The language of 'Hitting Budapest' crackles. This is a story with moral power and weight, it has the artistry to refrain from moral commentary. NoViolet Bulawayo is a writer who takes delight in language."

We Need New Names was shortlisted for the Man Booker Prize (2013), the Guardian First Book Award shortlist (2013), and a Barnes & Noble Discover Award finalist (2013). It was the winner of the inaugural Etisalat Prize for Literature (2013), and won the prestigious PEN/Hemingway Award for debut work of fiction. It won the Los Angeles Times Book Prize Art Seidenbaum Award for First Fiction (2013).

== Plot ==
The novel begins by following a group of mostly pre-teen children - the central character Darling and her friends Sbho, Stina, Chipo, Bastard and Godknows - living in tin shacks in Zimbabwe after their homes have been bulldozed by Mugabe's paramilitary police. The author gives "a child's-eye view of a world where there is talk of elections and democracy but where chaos and degradation become everyday reality, where death and sickness and the threat of violence lurk" in a shanty town misleadingly named Paradise, where people try to hold on to dignity while families fracture. The children spend their days getting into mischief, stealing guavas from the rich neighbourhood known as "Budapest", inventing a life of adventure and make-believe, daydreaming of enjoying luxury overseas in places such as Dubai and America.

When eventually Darling travels abroad to live with her aunt who is working in Detroit, Michigan, she discovers the many other struggles and stresses to be faced as an African immigrant to the US, including listening to misconceptions about one's land of birth, having to adapt to a new culture, and the fact that there are so many illegal immigrants in the States over whom the threat of deportation looms.

== Reviews ==
"Bulawayo's portrayal of Zimbabwe is notable not for its descriptions of Paradise and Budapest but for those of Darling's interior landscape. ... Bulawayo is clearly a gifted writer. She demonstrates a striking ability to capture the uneasiness that accompanies a newcomer's arrival in America, to illuminate how the reinvention of the self in a new place confronts the protective memory of the way things were back home." — Uzodinma Iweala, The New York Times

"How does a writer tell the story of a traumatised nation without being unremittingly bleak? NoViolet Bulawayo manages it by forming a cast of characters so delightful and joyous that the reader is seduced by their antics at the same time as finding out about the country's troubles. ... Bulawayo has created a debut that is poignant and moving but which also glows with humanity and humour." — Leyla Sanai, The Independent on Sunday

"What stops the book collapsing under its own thematic weight is a certain linguistic verve, and the sense that this is a really talented and ambitious author who might at any moment surprise the reader by a plot twist, some technical bravura, or a thematic transcendence that will take the story beyond its gratuitously dark concerns to another, more meaningful level. For really, what is the purpose of suffering in literature, especially in a coming-of-age novel, but to serve as midwife to spiritual and psychological growth?" — Helon Habila, The Guardian

"Written with kinetic energy that crackles with life, NoViolet Bulawayo's debut novel should be read by anyone interested in emerging voices in world literature. At times joyful, funny, melancholic, ferocious, and defiant, Bulawayo's first-person narrator, Darling, is a trenchant observer of the human condition." — Jim Hannan, World Literature Today

In The Independent, Margaret Busby reviewed the book's portrayal of Darling and her friends. She described the characters as having a mix of youth and life experience. The review noted that the group maintains their energy and hope while also facing difficult situations.
