= Charlie Connelly =

British author and broadcaster (born 1970)

- Born: 22 August 1970 (age 56); London, England
- Occupations: Author and broadcaster
- Writing career
- Period: 1998–present
- Genres: Travel, sports

Charlie Connelly (born 22 August 1970, London, England) is an author of popular non-fiction books. In addition to being a writer, Connelly also appears as a presenter on radio and television shows.

== Overview ==
Connelly's writing exhibits a self-deprecating humour and love of eccentricity that echoes the style of Bill Bryson. Similarly, Connelly shares with several other writers a fascination with subject-matter that had not previously been a feature of traditional travel writing.

Connelly began his career as a writer of books relating to sporting events, most commonly football. His breakthrough 2002 book, Stamping Grounds, was his fifth, and followed the Liechtenstein national football team in their unsuccessful campaign to qualify for the 2002 FIFA World Cup. His 2004 follow-up, Attention All Shipping, which was his first to deviate from football as its topic, has been listed as a best-seller and selected as Book of the Week by the UK radio station BBC Radio 4. Attention All Shipping was Connelly's first book not to take football as its central subject: again seeking out unusual destinations, he travels to each area mentioned in the Shipping Forecast made famous on BBC Radio 4.

In 2007, Connelly released his seventh book, In Search of Elvis, which again focused on travel and the impression left by entertainer Elvis Presley. Connelly's eighth book, And Did Those Feet: Walking Through 2000 Years Of British And Irish History, followed in 2008 in which Connelly undertook some notable journeys from history on foot and was again a BBC Radio 4 "Book of the Week", read by Martin Freeman.

Our Man in Hibernia, published in 2010, detailed Connelly's move to Ireland and his search for his Irish roots. His tenth book, Bring Me Sunshine, which examines the history of the weather and weather forecasting, appeared in September 2012. Bring Me Sunshine was also a BBC Radio 4 "Book of the Week", read by the actor Stephen Mangan.

On the Radcliffe & Maconie show on BBC 6 Music in December 2013, Bernard Sumner announced that he had engaged Connelly to co-write his autobiography. In 2016, Connelly collaborated with the twenty-times champion jockey Tony McCoy on his autobiography Winner: My Racing Life, which was shortlisted for Autobiography of the Year at the 2016 British Sports Book Awards.

Connelly's work has also appeared in The Guardian, The Daily Telegraph, The Times, the Scotsman and the Herald. Since May 2017, he has been the literary correspondent of The New European. Connelly was also a presenter on the BBC One television programme Holiday and has lectured at the Royal Geographical Society. He co-presented the first three series of the BBC Radio 4 programme Traveller's Tree with Fi Glover, has appeared on Excess Baggage and Loose Ends and has made documentaries for BBC Radio 4 on subjects ranging from the poetry of Noël Coward to the cricket coach Alfred Gover.

In August 2008, Attention All Shipping was voted the second greatest audiobook in a public vote organised by The Guardian newspaper and Waterstone's bookshops, finishing behind The Hitchhiker's Guide to the Galaxy.

In October 2014, Connelly premiered a one-man show based on Attention All Shipping with a sold-out performance at the Cutty Sark Studio Theatre.

== Bibliography ==
- 1998 – I Just Can't Help Believing: The Relegation Experience
- 1999 – London Fields: A Journey Through Football's Metroland
- 2000 – Spirit High and Passion Pure: A Journey Through European Football
- 2001 – Many Miles... a Season in the Life of Charlton Athletic
- 2002 – Stamping Grounds: Liechtenstein's Quest for the World Cup
- 2004 – Attention All Shipping: A Journey Round the Shipping Forecast
- 2007 – In Search of Elvis: A Journey to Find the Man Beneath the Jumpsuit
- 2009 – And Did Those Feet: Walking Through 2000 Years Of British And Irish History
- 2010 – Our Man In Hibernia: Ireland, The Irish And Me
- 2012 – Bring Me Sunshine: A Windswept, Rain-Soaked, Sun-Kissed, Snow-Capped Guide To Our Weather
- 2014 – Chapter and Verse: Joy Division, New Order and Me by Bernard Sumner (co-writer)
- 2014 – The Forgotten Soldier
- 2014 – Elk Stopped Play, And Other Tales From Wisden's Cricket Round The World (Editor)
- 2015 - Constance Street
- 2016 - Gilbert: The Last Years of W.G. Grace
- 2016 - Winner: My Racing Life by Tony McCoy (co-writer)
- 2019 - Last Train to Hilversum: A journey in search of the magic of radio
- 2020 - The Channel
