= Shahidha Bari =

British academic, broadcaster, critic and philosopher (born 1980

Prof Shahidha Bari
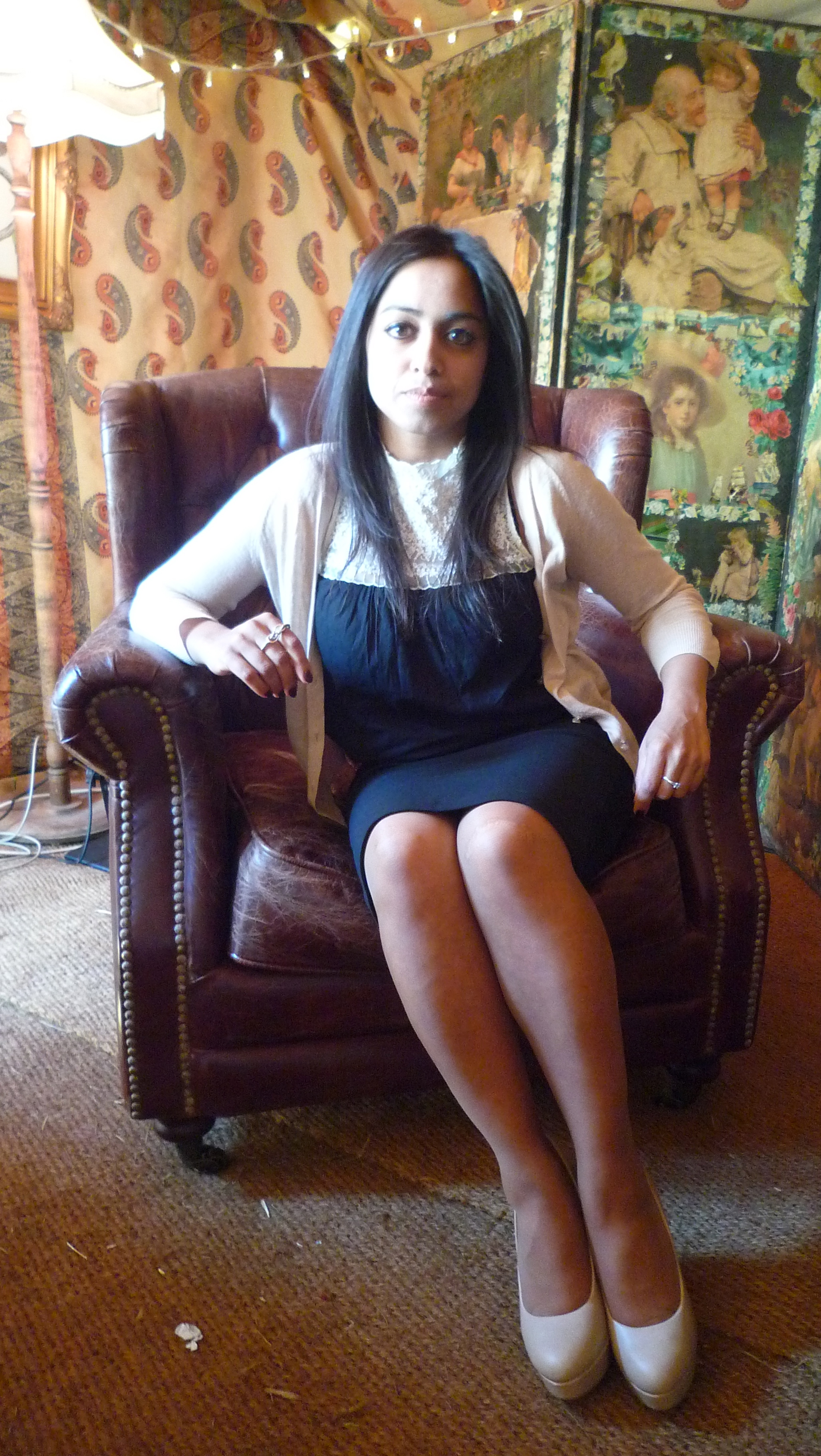
- Bari in 2013
- Born: 1980 (age 45–46)
- Education: King's College, Cambridge
- Occupations: Academic, critic, broadcaster
- Employer: University of the Arts London

Shahidha Bari (born 1980) is a British academic, critic and broadcaster in the fields of literature, philosophy and art. She is a professor at the University of the Arts London based at London College of Fashion. She was a host of the topical arts television programme Inside Culture on BBC Two, standing in for Mary Beard. She is currently one of the presenters of the BBC Radio 4 arts and ideas programme Free Thinking (previously titled Night Waves), and an occasional presenter of BBC Radio 4's Start the Week and Front Row.

== Biography ==
Bari studied English at King's College, Cambridge. She now lives in London. She is a Fellow of the Forum for Philosophy at the London School of Economics and an arts reviewer for a number of publications. She comes from a family of Bengali Muslims.

Her academic work moves between philosophy, literature and visual culture. Her book Dressed: The Philosophy of Clothes was published in 2019. Her latest book, Look Again: Fashion is a viewer's guide to fashion in the Tate Britain art collection.

In 2011, Bari was selected as one of ten BBC Radio 3 New Generation Thinkers, a new project launched in conjunction with the Arts and Humanities Research Council (AHRC) to communicate academic research to a wider audience. She is the winner of the 2014/15 Observer Anthony Burgess Arts Journalism Prize, for a "powerful and insightful" review of the National Theatre's Medea.

In print, her writing appears in The Financial Times, The Observer and the New Statesman. She is one of the regular books reviewers for The Guardian and The Times Literary Supplement, a contributor to Aeon and frieze and appears as a cultural critic on BBC TV. She has presented documentaries for BBC Radio 4 and the BBC World Service.

Bari was on the board of the educational mentoring charity The Arts Emergency Service and was a trustee of the Brontë Parsonage Museum and Art Night. She is currently a Trustee at The Booker Prizes. She was the chair of judges for the Forward Prizes for Poetry in 2019, a judge for the Baillie Gifford Prize for Non-Fiction in 2020 and on the judging panel for The Booker Prize 2022.
