= Dignum =

Dignum is a surname. Notable people with the surname include:

- Danny Dignum (born 1992), British boxer
- Charles Dignum (c. 1765–1827), British tenor singer, actor, and composer
- Frank Dignum (born 1961), Dutch computer scientist
- Virginia Dignum (born 1964), computer scientist
