= Marietje Schaake =

Dutch politician (born 1978)

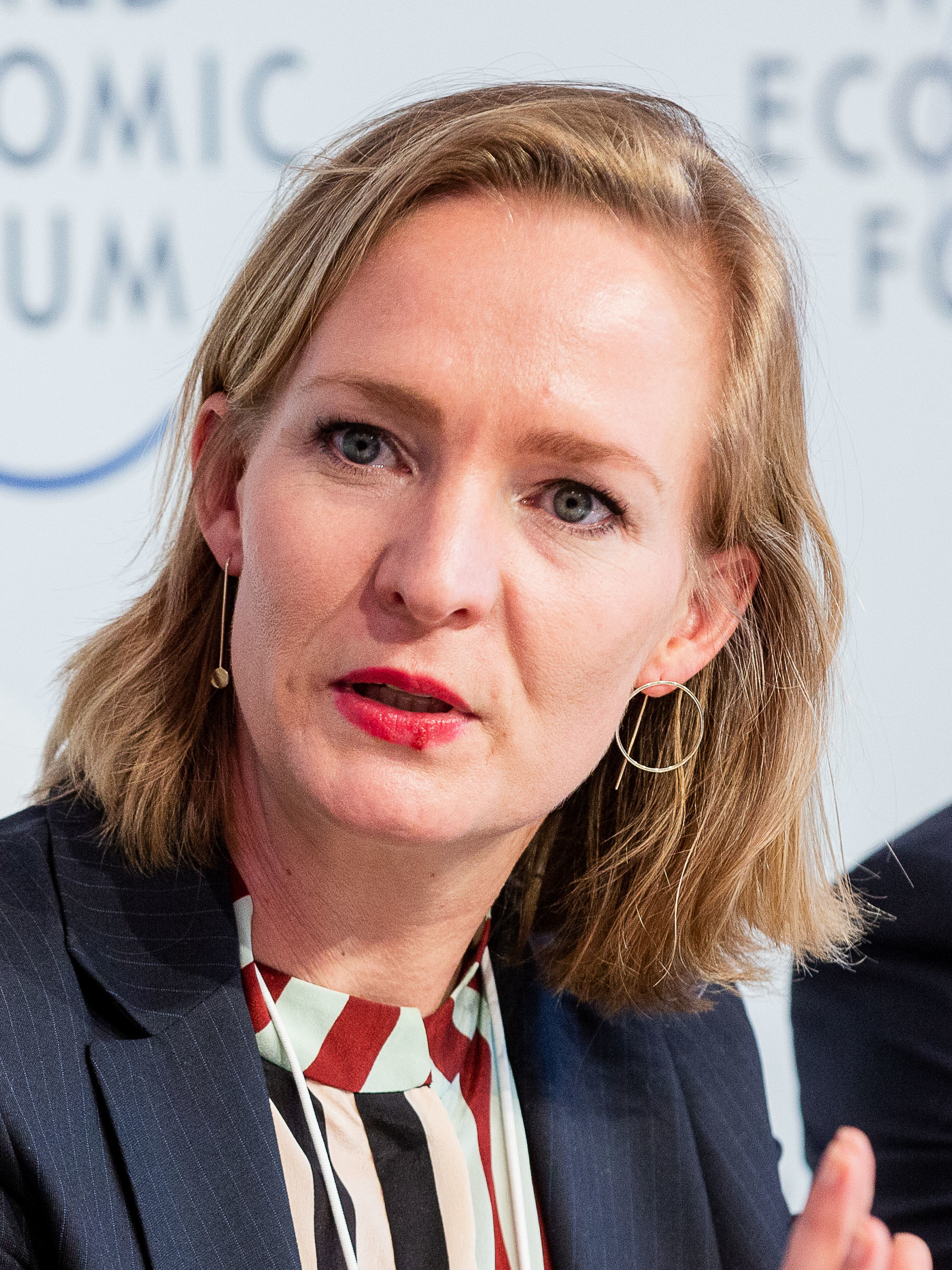
- Schaake during the WEF 2019

Member of the European Parliament
- In office 1 July 2009 – 2019
- Constituency: Netherlands

Personal details
- Born: 28 October 1978 (age 48) Leiden, Netherlands
- Party: Dutch; Democrats 66; EU; Alliance of Liberals and Democrats for Europe
- Education: University of Amsterdam Wittenberg University
- Website: marietjeschaake.eu

Maria Renske "Marietje" Schaake (Dutch pronunciation: [maːˈritɕə ˈsxaːkə]; born 28 October 1978) is a Dutch politician who served as Member of the European Parliament (MEP) from the Netherlands between 2009 and 2019. She is a member of Democrats 66, part of the Alliance of Liberals and Democrats for Europe Party.

Schaake has been named international director of policy at Stanford's Cyber Policy Center, as well as an International Policy Fellow at the University’s Institute for Human-Centered Artificial Intelligence.

The Wall Street Journal called her "Europe's most wired politician", while CNN called her a "rising Dutch star" who makes an increasingly rare "passionate and public case for liberalism and globalization". She was selected as one of the "Politico 28" in 2017. During her last months in office in 2019, Politico also called her one of the 40 MEP's who mattered in 2014–2019. According to Politico, Schaake is the "ultimate digital MEP" whose name has been floated as a potential candidate for the foreign ministry". The magazine also called her a "lead MEP on cybersecurity". In 2017 she was invited as a 'civic leader' to address the Obama Foundation summit. She publishes op-eds in the Financial Times, The Guardian and Bloomberg. She writes a column for the Financial Times and the Dutch NRC newspaper’s economic section twice a month.

== Education and early career ==
Schaake was raised in Leiden and attended the Haags Montessori Lyceum (high school) in The Hague. She then left for the United States to study liberal arts at Wittenberg University in Ohio. She then studied sociology, American studies and new media at the University of Amsterdam. After an internship with the International Criminal Tribunal for the former Yugoslavia, Schaake was granted the Lantos Fellowship of the United States House of Representatives, where she focused on international relations and human rights issues.

Before her political career, Schaake served as an independent advisor to, amongst others, the United States Ambassador to the Netherlands and to the president of the Leadership Conference on Civil Rights in Washington, D.C. Other assignments included consulting the Dutch Ministry of Foreign Affairs, as well as cultural institutes and companies. Schaake specialized in issues such as transatlantic relations, diversity, integration, civil rights and Muslims in the West. In 2007 she received the Barney Karbank Memorial Award 2007 for outstanding leadership on the issue of human rights.

== Political career ==
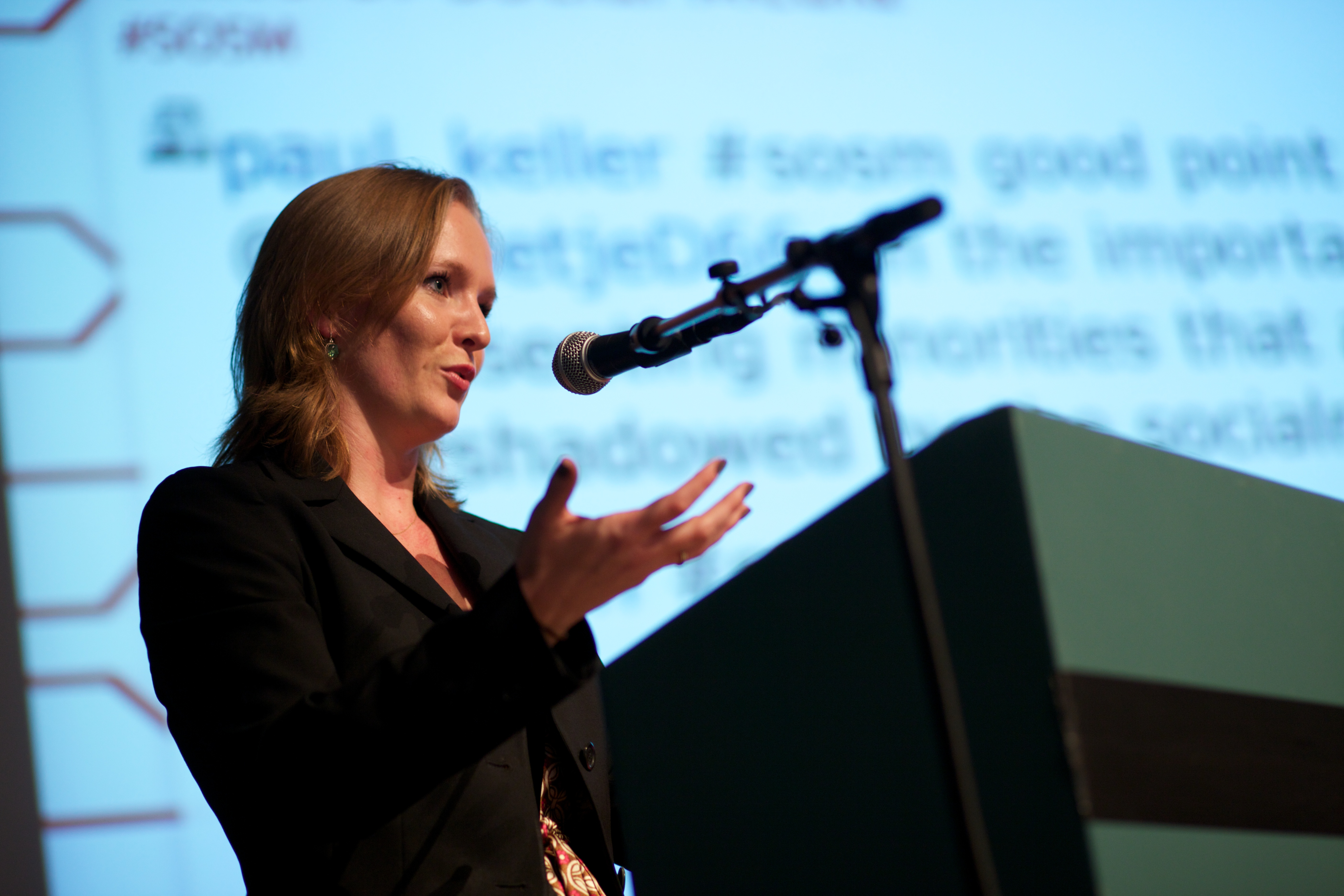
Marietje Schaake in 2010

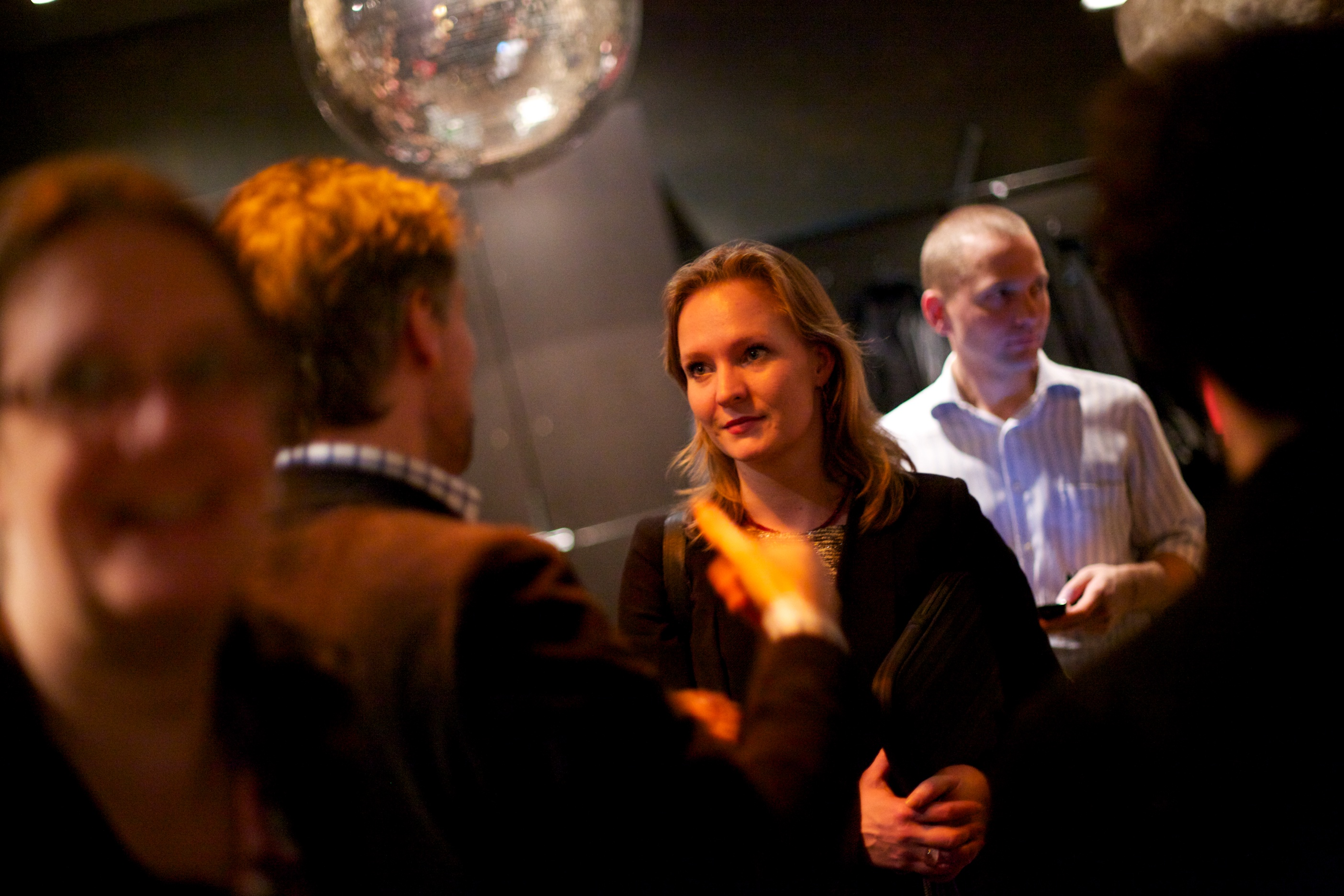
Marietje Schaake in 2012

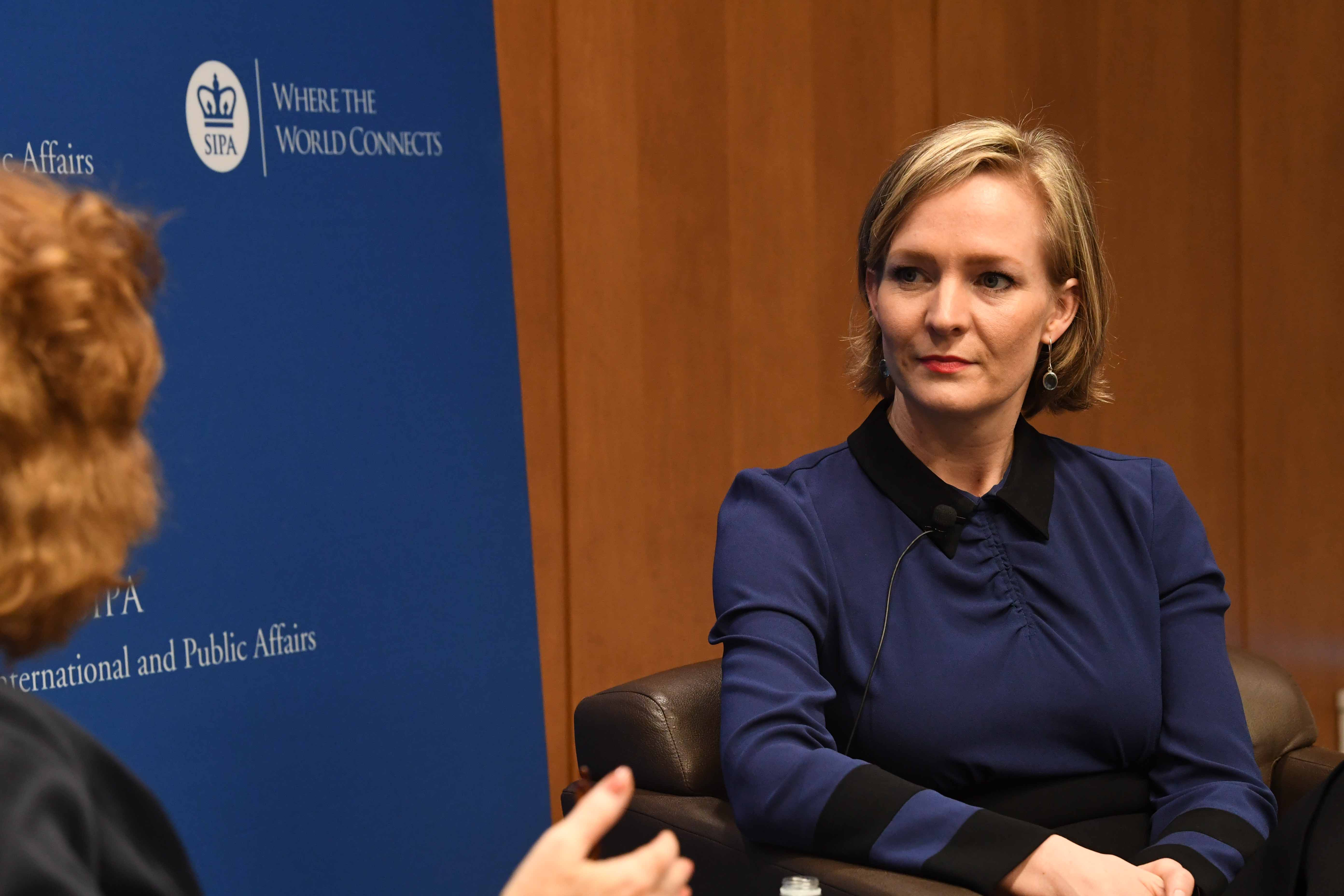
Marietje Schaake speaking at Columbia University 2018

In the autumn of 2008, Schaake was nominated as candidate for the European Parliament for the Dutch political party Democrats 66 (D66). In the European Parliament elections of 2009, Schaake was elected at age 30 when D66 won three seats. In the 2014 elections, she was re-elected for a second term.

In the European Parliament, Schaake was the ALDE Coordinator of the International Trade committee (INTA). She was also the spokesperson for the ALDE Group on the Canada-EU Trade Agreement Transatlantic Trade and Investment Partnership (TTIP). In 2016, she served as the parliament's rapporteur on a ban on trade in certain goods which could be used for capital punishment, torture or other treatment or punishment. She then pushed for stricter export controls for cybersurveillance technologies through her work on the dual-use legislation. Schaake also advanced stronger oversight over the trade in cultural goods from conflict areas.

Schaake additionally served on the committee on Foreign Affairs (AFET), where she focused on strengthening Europe as a global player. She worked on the EU's neighbourhood policy, notably Turkey, Iran and North Africa and the broader Middle East. In the subcommittee on Human Rights (DROI), she spoke on human rights and coordinated the monthly human rights resolutions for ALDE.

During her period in parliament, Schaake took several initiatives to promote digital freedoms and to include them in European Union foreign policy. She was the vice-president of the delegation for relations with the United States and served in the delegation for relations with Iran, and in the delegation for the Arab peninsula. Schaake pushed for completing Europe's Digital Single Market and copyright reform. She supports an open internet in discussions about internet governance and digital (human) rights.

Schaake established the Intergroup on the Digital Agenda for Europe. In this group members of the European Parliament, cross-party and cross-nationality, work together in strengthening the digital agenda for Europe.

In March 2011, the European Parliament adopted Schaake's report on the Cultural Dimensions of the EU's External Actions. This was followed by the adoption of Schaake's report on a Digital Freedom Strategy in EU Foreign Policy in December 2012 and her report on Freedom of the Press and Media in the World in June 2013. Furthermore, in April 2014 the European Parliament supported Schaake's amendments to enshrine net neutrality into European telecommunications legislation.

In 2017, Federica Mogherini, High Representative of the Union for Foreign Affairs and Security Policy and vice-president of the European Commission, appointed Schaake as chief observer of the European Union Election Observation Mission to Kenya. In 2017, she was also appointed to represent the European Parliament to the board of the Madad fund. This European Commission Trust Fund concentrates the financial support of different EU institutions, member states and other donors under one heading to more effectively distribute aid to those within Syria and its surrounding countries.

In 2017, Schaake was appointed to the Global Commission on the Stability of Cyberspace, and served on the commission until its successful conclusion in 2019, participating in the drafting of its eight norms related to non-aggression in cyberspace.

In September 2018, Schaake announced that she would not seek a third term and would not participate in the 2019 European elections. This decision followed her loss in the primary election to become the lead candidate for D66, where she received 45% of the vote, compared to 55% for Sophie in 't Veld, in the final round of voting.

== Later career ==
On 25 September 2020, Schaake was named as one of the 25 members of the "Real Facebook Oversight Board", an independent monitoring group over Facebook. In 2022 she also joined the International Center for Future Generations, a Brussels-based think tank, as senior fellow for Tech Governance.

Schaake was also a candidate to become United Nations Secretary-General António Guterres's first-ever Envoy on Technology in 2021; instead, the role went to Chilean diplomat Fabrizio Hochschild Drummond. In 2023, Guterres appointed Schaake to his Artificial Intelligence Advisory Body on risks, opportunities and international governance of artificial intelligence, co-chaired by Carme Artigas and James Manyika.

== Other activities ==
Schaake has several unpaid additional positions, including the following:

- Centre for Humanitarian Dialogue, Member of the Board (since 2021)
- European Council on Foreign Relations (ECFR), member of the board of trustees (since 2020)
- European Union Agency for Cybersecurity, advisory board member
- Reporters Without Borders, Information and Democracy Working Group, co-chair
- Reset, advisory board
- IvIR Law and Policy Lab, advisory board
- Access Now, board member
- Friends of Europe, board of trustees
- Observer Research Foundation, global board member
- Transatlantic Commission on Election Integrity (TCEI), member (since 2018)
- Global Commission on the Stability of Cyberspace, commissioner
- Chatham House Commission on Democracy and Technology, member
- Design 4 Democracy coalition, advisory board member
- Centre for Humane Technology, advisor
- Digital Freedom Fund, friend
- European Leadership Network (ELN), member
- Prince Claus Fund, member of the board
- Publeaks, member of the advisory board
- Public Spaces, member of the board of advisors
- Transatlantic High-Level Working Group on Content Moderation and Freedom of Expression (TWG), member of the steering committee
- Tahrir Institute for Middle East Policy, member of the board of advisors
- World Economic Forum (WEF), co-chair of the Global Future Council on Agile Governance
- CEPS Task Force on Software Vulnerability Disclosure in Europe, chair (until 2018)
- Young Global Leader, Class of 2014
- European Leadership Network (ELN), Senior Network member

Schaake is also a member of the board of advisors at the EU-funded research project 'Media, Conflict and Democratisation'. In September 2013, Schaake joined the steering committee of the "Transatlantic Dialogues on Security and Freedom in the Digital Age" project of the New America Foundation. Earlier she was a commissioner at the Global Commission on Internet Governance and a member of the board of directors at the Flemish-Dutch House deBuren. All additional positions are unpaid.

Schaake published "THE TECH COUP: How to Save Democracy from Silicon Valley" with Princeton University Press (2024) and with the Dutch news website De Correspondent "De Machtscode: hoe de onzichtbare belangenstrijd achter AI onze democratie bedreigt" in 2026.

== Electoral history ==
Electoral history of Marietje Schaake
Year	Body	Party	Pos.	Votes	Result		Ref.
Year	Body	Party	Pos.	Votes	Party seats	Individual	Ref.
2014	European Parliament	Democrats 66	3	41236	4	Elected	
2021	House of Representatives	Democrats 66	77	363	24	Lost	
