= Anna Christmann =

German politician (Alliance 90/The Greens)

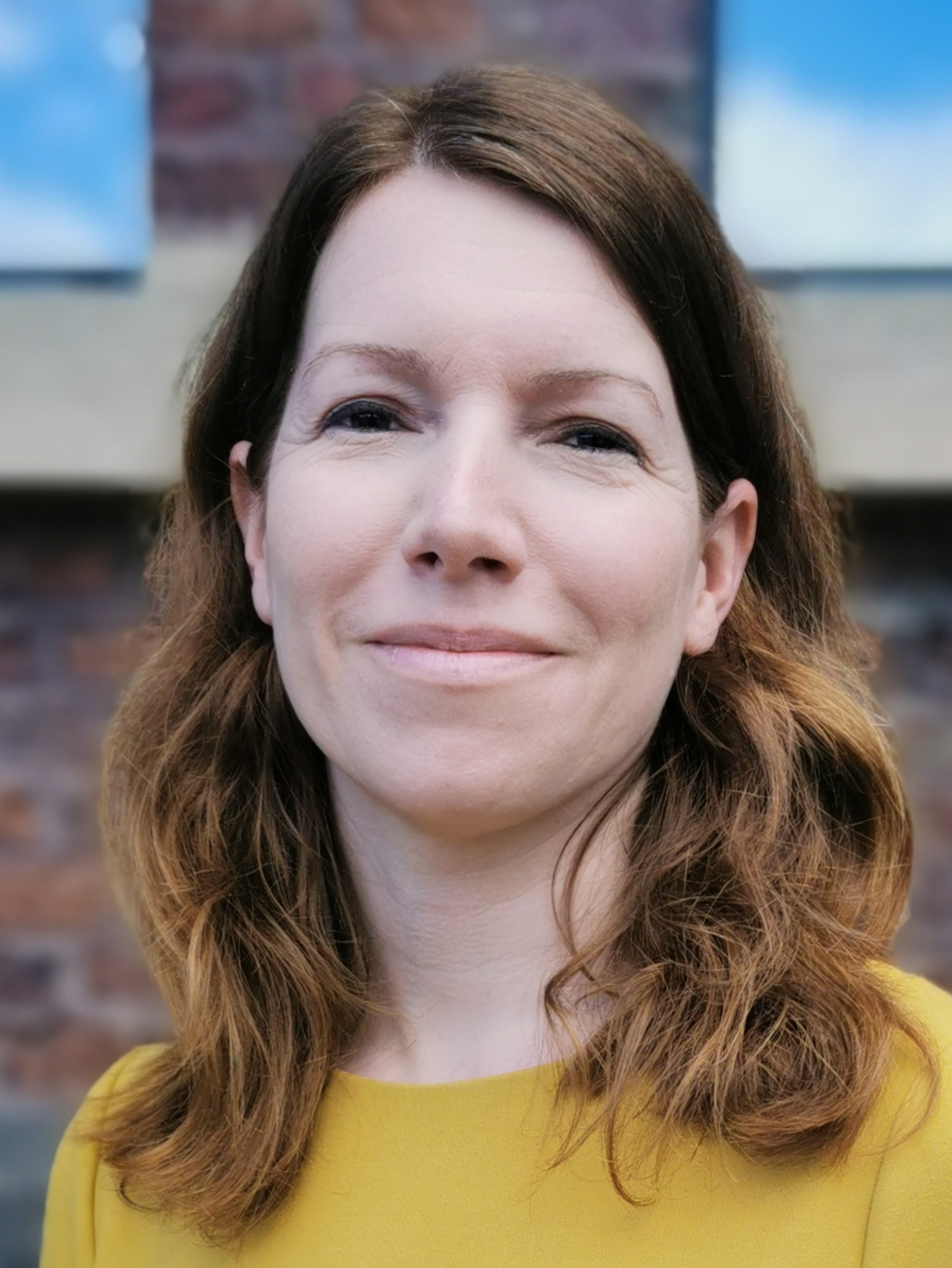

Member of the Bundestag
- In office 2017–2025

Personal details
- Born: 24 September 1983 (age 42) Hannover, West Germany (now Germany)
- Party: Greens
- Education: University of Heidelberg; University of Bern

Anna Christmann (born 24 September 1983) is a German politician of Alliance 90/The Greens who served as a member of the Bundestag, the German parliament, from 2017 to 2025.

In addition to her parliamentary work, Christmann served as Coordinator for Aerospace Policy at the Federal Ministry for Economic Affairs and Climate Action in the government of Chancellor Olaf Scholz from 2022 to 2025.

== Education and early career ==
Christmann studied political science at the University of Heidelberg and received a PhD from the University of Bern in 2011. During that time, she Christmann lived in Zürich and spent a semester at the University of California, Irvine.

Christman subsequently worked at the University of Zurich. From 2013 until 2017, she served in various positions at the State Ministry of Science, Research, and Arts of Baden-Württemberg, including as chief of staff to minister Theresia Bauer.

== Political career ==
Christmann first became a member of the German Bundestag in the 2017 elections, representing the Stuttgart II district. In parliament, she served on the Committee on Education, Research and Technology Assessment and the Committee on the Digital Agenda. She was also her parliamentary group's spokesperson on technology and innovation policy.

In addition to her committee assignments, Christmann was a member of the German delegation to the Franco-German Parliamentary Assembly from 2019 to 2025. She also served as deputy chairwoman of the German-Swiss Parliamentary Friendship Group.

In 2023, United Nations Secretary General António Guterres appointed Christmann to his Artificial Intelligence Advisory Body on risks, opportunities and international governance of artificial intelligence, co-chaired by Carme Artigas and James Manyika.

== Other activities ==
=== Corporate boards ===
- KfW Capital, Member of the Advisory Board (since 2022)

=== Non-profit organizations ===
- Leibniz Association, Member of the Senate (since 2022)
- Max Planck Institute for Intelligent Systems, Member of the Board of Trustees
