= Roel Wieringa =

Dutch computer scientist

Roelf (Roel) Johannes Wieringa (born 1952) is a Dutch computer scientist who was a professor of Information Systems at the University of Twente, specialized in the "integration of formal and informal specification and design techniques".

== Biography ==
Wieringa received his MSc in 1978 at the University of Groningen, Faculty of Mathematics, for the thesis "Generatieve Grammatika's en Bijbehorende Analyseprocedures voor Natuurlijke talen" (Generative Grammars and Their Analysis procedures for NaturalLanguages". He received his MA in 1987 at the University of Amsterdam, Faculty of Philosophy for the thesis "Machine intelligence and Explication", and his PhD in 1990 at the Vrije Universiteit Amsterdam, under supervision of Reinder Pieter van de Riet for the thesis "Algebraic Foundations for Dynamic Conceptual Models".

After finishing his PhD, he continued to work at the Faculty of Mathematics and Computer Science of the Vrije Universiteit. In 1998 he joined the Department of Computer Science of the University of Twente as Professor of Information Systems. From 2006 to 2011 he was scientific director of the School of Information and Knowledge Systems (SIKS), and from 2009 to 2012 he headed the computer science department at the University of Twente.

Circa 1996, Wieringa and Frank Dehne wrote the Toolkit for Conceptual Modeling, for Wieringa's conceptual modeling courses, and the book Requirements Engineering: Frameworks for Understanding.

Wieringa was associate editor in chief of the IEEE Software journal from 2004 to 2007. He was a member of the editorial board of the International Journal of Business Information Systems, the Journal of Software and Systems Modeling, and the Requirements Engineering Journal.

In 2019, Wieringa retired from academia, and now works and blogs at the Value Engineers, which was founded in 2017 with Jaap Gordijn and Dan Ionita.

== The engineering cycle ==
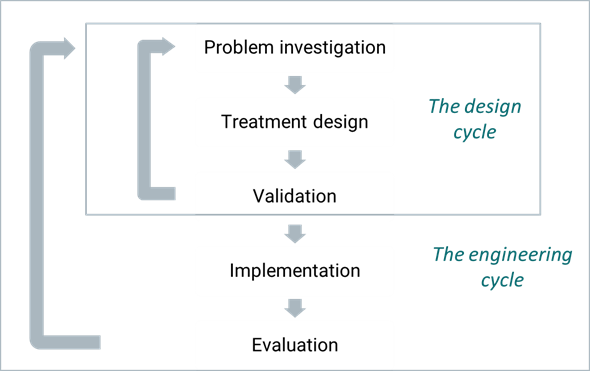
The engineering cycle and the design cycle. Artwork by Stefan Morcov, describing the model proposed by Wieringa, 2014.

The engineering cycle is a framework used in design science for information systems and software engineering, proposed by Roel Wieringa in his book Design Science Methodology for Information Systems and Software Engineering.

The engineering cycle consists of:

- Problem investigation
- Treatment design
- Treatment validation
- Treatment implementation
- Implementation evaluation

The design cycle consists of the first three tasks of the engineering cycle: investigation, design, and validation.

The engineering and design cycles do not prescribe a mandatory, rigid sequence of activities. Moreover, they are often applied recursively for sub-problems of the main research objective.

The engineering cycle and the design cycle are often applied in several iterations (hence "cycle"). In such a case, the evaluation may become the investigation part of the next engineering cycle.

=== Validation vs. evaluation in the engineering cycle ===
According to the design science methodology of Wieringa, validation is part of the design cycle. It involves checking if the designed artifacts support the initial assumptions. It is executed in a theoretical, "laboratory" environment, such as through discussions and interviews with practitioners and experts. Validation is executed before the implementation in practice.

On the other hand, evaluation is executed after the implementation in practice of the designs. It involves analyzing the behavior, effects, and impact of the designed artifacts in practice, in the field. In our case, this meant implementation and analysis of the designs in actual, industry IT projects.

Stefan Morcov proposes a parallel between these two activities and a similar framework, the Technology Readiness Level (TRL) model. The TRL model was proposed by NASA, and is currently also widely applied in the European Union's research programs such as Horizon. Thus, validation leads to TRL level 4 - "Technology validated in a laboratory environment", while evaluation leads to a TRL level 6 - "Technology demonstrated in a relevant environment".

== Publications ==
Books, a selection:

- 1990. Algebraic Foundations for Dynamic Conceptual Models. PhD thesis Vrije Universiteit Amsterdam.
- 1996. Requirements Engineering: Frameworks for Understanding. Wiley.
- 1998. The role of deontic logic in the specification of information systems. With J-J. Meyer, and Frank PM Dignum. Springer US.
- 2003. Design methods for reactive systems: Yourdon, Statemate, and the UML. Elsevier.
- 2008. Competences of IT Architects. With Erik Proper, Pascal van Eck and Claudia Steghuis. The Hague: Academic Service.
- 2014. Design Science Methodology for Information Systems and Software Engineering. Springer.

Articles, a selection:

- 1991. "The identification of objects and roles-object identifiers revisited." With Wiebren de Jonge.
- 2003. "Aligning application architecture to the business context." With others in Advanced Information Systems Engineering. Springer Berlin Heidelberg, 2003.
- 2006. "Enterprise architecture: Management tool and blueprint for the organisation." With Henk Jonkers. Marc Lankhorst et al. in Information Systems Frontiers 8.2 (2006): 63–66.
