= Christmann =

Christmann is a German surname. Notable people with the surname include:

- Anna Christmann (born 1983), German politician
- Gunter Christmann (1936–2013), German-born Australian painter
- Jakob Christmann (1554–1613), German Orientalist
- Karl Christmann (1912–1944), German World War II pilot
- Randel Christmann (born 1960), U.S. politician
