= Reinder van de Riet =

Dutch computer scientist

Reinder Pieter van de Riet
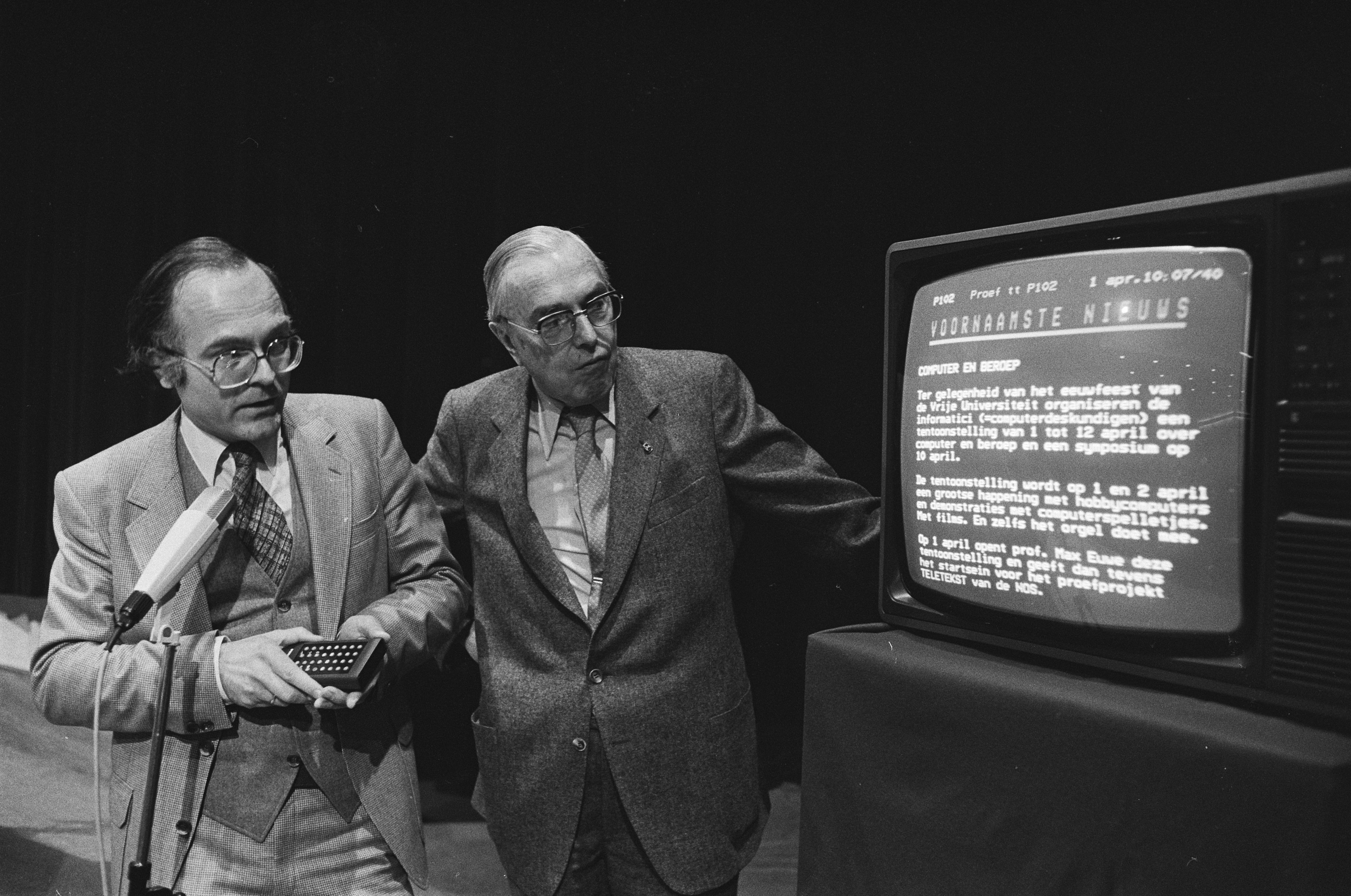
- Van de Riet and Max Euwe presenting Dutch Teletext (1980)
- Born: 22 April 1939; Groningen, Netherlands
- Died: 18 December 2008 (aged 69); Baarn, Netherlands
- Citizenship: Netherlands
- Education: University of Amsterdam (Ph.D., 1968)
- Known for: Editor, Europe of Data and Knowledge Engineering; COLOR-X event modeling language
- Scientific career
- Fields: Computer science
- Institutions: Vrije Universiteit Amsterdam
- Thesis: ALGOL 60 as Formula Manipulation Language (1968)
- Doctoral advisor: Adriaan van Wijngaarden
- Doctoral students: Peter Apers, Martin L. Kersten, Frank Dignum, Roel Wieringa, Frances Brazier

Reinder Pieter (Reind) van de Riet (22 April 1939, Groningen – 18 December 2008, Baarn) was a Dutch computer scientist and Emeritus Professor Information Systems at the Vrije Universiteit Amsterdam, known for the development of COLOR-X, a linguistically-based event modeling language for object modeling.

Van de Riet received his Doctor of Philosophy (Ph.D.) in computer science at the University of Amsterdam in 1968 under supervision of Adriaan van Wijngaarden for the thesis, entitled "ALGOL 60 as Formula Manipulation Language." In 1970, he was appointed Professor Information Systems at the VU University Amsterdam, where he retired August 2000. Among his Ph.D. students were Peter Apers (1982), Martin L. Kersten (1985), Frank Dignum (1989), Roel Wieringa (1990) and Frances Brazier (1991).

Van de Riet was editor of Europe of Data and Knowledge Engineering journal and member of the Editorial Board of the Information Systems Journal. His research interests were in the field of "database and Knowledge bases; the use of Linguistics; Security and Privacy problems; and computational auditing." He was knighted into the Orde van de Nederlandse Leeuw. He died in Baarn, Netherlands, 18 December 2008, shortly after a lecture trip through the United States.

== Selected publications ==
- Sicherman, George L., Wiebren De Jonge, and Reind P. Van de Riet. "Answering queries without revealing secrets." ACM Transactions on Database Systems (TODS) 8.1 (1983): 41-59.
- De Jonge, Wiebren, Andrew S. Tanenbaum, and Reind P. Van De Riet. "Two access methods using compact binary trees." Software Engineering, IEEE Transactions on 7 (1987): 799-810.
- Burg, J. F. M., and R. P. Van de Riet. "COLOR-X: Object Modeling pro ts from Linguistics." Towards Very Large Knowledge Bases: Knowledge Building & Knowledge Sharing (KB&KS'95) (1994): 204-214.
- Burg, J. F. M., and Reind P. van de Riet. "COLOR-X: Linguistically-based event modeling: A general approach to dynamic modeling." Advanced Information Systems Engineering. Springer Berlin Heidelberg, 1995.
- Olivier, Martin S., Reind P. van de Riet, and Ehud Gudes. "Specifying application-level security in workflow systems." Database and Expert Systems Applications, 1998. Proceedings. Ninth International Workshop on. IEEE, 1998.
