= Frances Brazier =

Dutch computer scientist

Frances Mary Theresa Brazier (born 1957) is a Dutch computer scientist, known as one of the founders of NLnet, the first Internet service provider in the Netherlands and one of the first in Europe. She is a professor in Engineering Systems Foundations at the Delft University of Technology, where her research concerns multi-agent systems and participatory systems design.

== Education and career ==
Brazier was born in Toronto, and moved to the Netherlands as a teenager. She studied mathematics, computer science, and cognitive psychology at Vrije Universiteit Amsterdam, earning a master's degree in 1983, and completing a doctorate in 1991. Her dissertation was Design and evaluation of a user interface for information retrieval, promoted by Reinder van de Riet and Sipke Fokkema.

She became an assistant professor at Vrije Universiteit Amsterdam in 1991, an associate professor in 1998, and professor in the chair of intelligent interactive distributed systems in 2000. She moved to Delft University of Technology in 2009 where she holds the chair of systems engineering foundations.

== Trivia ==
In 2026, SIDN, the registry for the .nl country code top-level domain, named one of its meeting rooms in her honor.
