= Toolkit for Conceptual Modeling =

Software tools to specify software systems

The Toolkit for Conceptual Modeling (TCM) is a collection of software tools to present specifications of software systems in the form of diagrams, tables, trees, and the like. TCM offers editors for techniques used in Structured Analysis as well as editors for object-oriented (UML) techniques. For some of the behavior specification techniques, an interface to model checkers is offered. More in particular, TCM contains the following editors.

- Generic editors for generic diagrams, generic tables and generic trees. All available icons can be used and no syntactic diagram constraints are checked.
- Unified Modeling Language (UML) editors for static structure (i.e. class and object) diagrams, use-case diagrams, activity diagrams, statecharts, collaboration diagrams, component diagrams and deployment diagrams.
- Structured Analysis (SA) editors for entity-relationship diagrams, data and event flow diagrams, state transition diagrams, function refinement trees, transaction-use tables and function-entity type tables.
- Miscellaneous editors such as for JSD (process structure and network diagrams), recursive process graphs and transaction decomposition tables. These editors are no longer updated but they will remain available within TCM.

The Toolkit for Conceptual Modeling was written circa 1996, by Roel Wieringa and Frank Dehne, for Wieringa's conceptual modeling courses and books, Requirements Engineering: Frameworks for Understanding, and Design Methods for Reactive Systems: Yourdon, Statemate and the UML.

PDF versions of the User Guide and report, The Yourdon Systems Method and the toolkit for conceptual modeling are available for download.

TCM was an example of Computer Aided Software Engineering support for Method for Conceptual Modeling (MCM) in Model-Driven Architecture in Practice. It was referenced in Petri Net Technology for Communication-Based Systems, Formal Ontology in Information Systems, and Proceedings : Ninth International Workshop on Software Specification and Design.

TCM has been cited in patents for automatic software production.

In 1997, NASA converted TCM C++ source to Java for a Web-based Hyper-text Environment for Requirements Engineering (WHERE) project.

== See also ==
- Model Driven Engineering (MDE)
