= James Manyika =

Zimbabwean-American consultant, researcher and writer

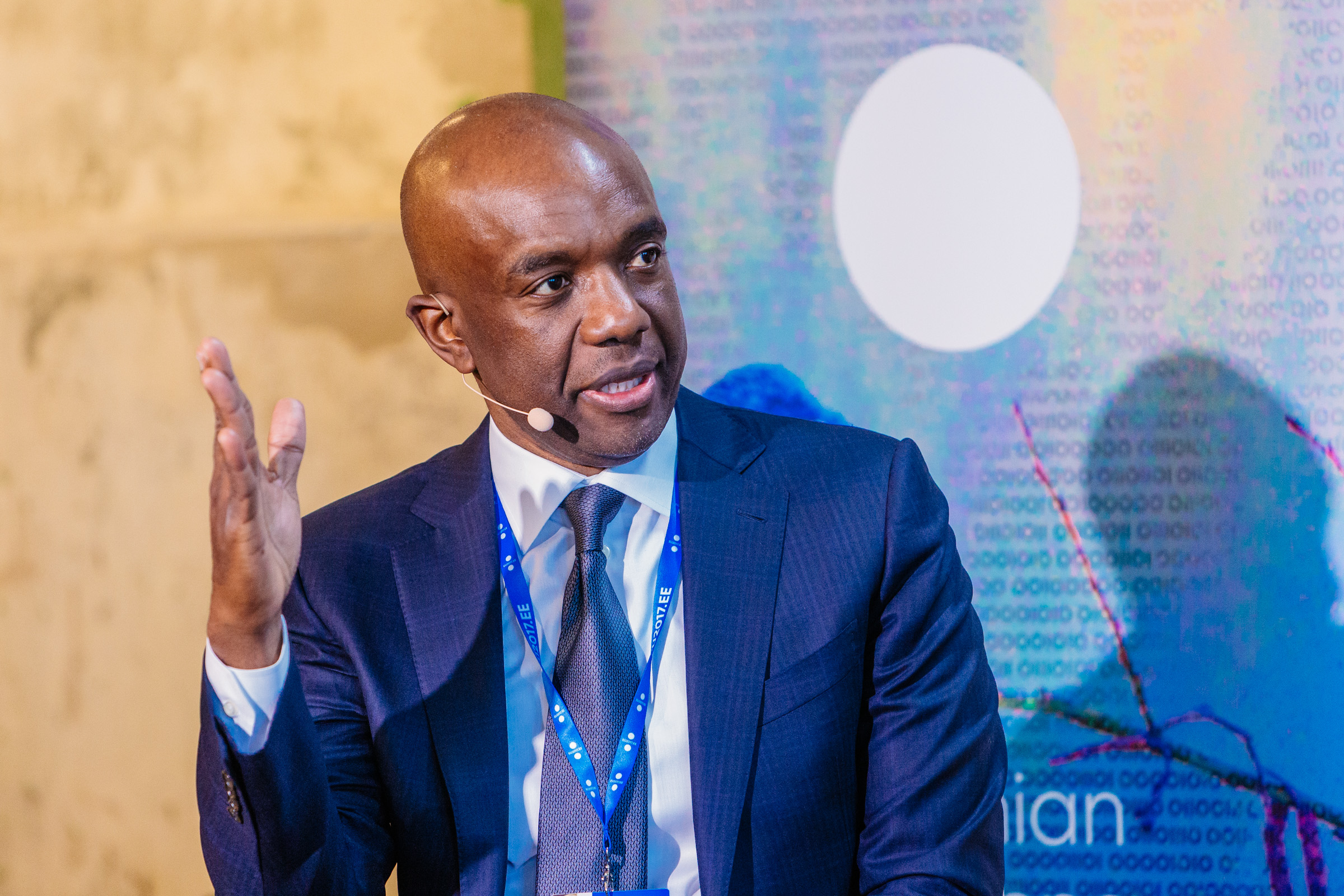
- Manyika speaking in 2017
- Born: Zimbabwe
- Other names: James M. Manyika, J Manyika
- Education: University of Zimbabwe (BSc); Oxford University (MSc, MA, DPhil)
- Occupations: Academic, consultant, business executive
- Years active: 1989–present
- Employer(s): McKinsey Global Institute (Chairman Emeritus); McKinsey & Company (senior partner emeritus); Google (Senior Vice President)
- Spouse: Sarah Ladipo Manyika

James M. Manyika is a Zimbabwean-American academic and business executive. He is currently a Senior Vice President at Google-Alphabet and a member of the senior leadership team. He is also known for his research and scholarship into the intersection of technology and the economy, including artificial intelligence, robotics automation, and the future of work. He became Google's first Senior Vice President of Technology and Society, reporting directly to Google CEO Sundar Pichai, focusing on "shaping and sharing" the company's view on the way tech affects society, the economy, and the planet. In April 2023, his role was expanded to Senior Vice President at Google-Alphabet and President for Research, Labs, Technology & Society and includes overseeing Google Research and Google Labs and focusing more broadly on helping advance Google’s and Google DeepMind's most ambitious innovations in AI, Computing and Science. He is also Chairman Emeritus of the McKinsey Global Institute.

Previously, Manyika was director and chairman of the McKinsey Global Institute, where he researched and co-authored a number of reports on topics such as technology, the future of work and workplace automation, and other global economy trends. During the Obama administration, Manyika served as vice-chair of the United States Global Development Council at the White House. He has served on various advisory boards to US Secretaries of Commerce and of State and as the vice chair of the National AI Advisory Committee established by Congress to advice the President on AI.

As a board-member, trustee, or advisor, Manyika has been involved with think tanks, national and international commissions, academic institutions, and non-profit and philanthropic foundations including the Council on Foreign Relations, the MacArthur Foundation, the Hewlett Foundation, the Broad Institute of MIT and Harvard, Stanford's Human-Centered AI Institute, MIT Schwarzman College of Computing, the Oxford Internet Institute, and the Aspen Institute. He is a fellow at DeepMind. He is also a visiting professor at Oxford University's Blavatnik School of Government.

== Early life and education ==
Born and raised in Zimbabwe, James Manyika attended Prince Edward School and received a Bachelor of Science in Electrical Engineering at the University of Zimbabwe. He attended Oxford University as a Rhodes Scholar, earning a Master of Science in mathematics and computer science, a Master of Arts, and a Doctor of Philosophy in AI and Robotics.

== Career ==
Trained in AI and robotics, while at Oxford Manyika studied computer science, artificial intelligence (AI), robotics, and topics such as Bayesian networks decentralized data fusion, and multi-agent systems. He and Hugh F. Durrant-Whyte published the book Decentralized Data Fusion: An Information Theoretic Approach in 1994. Early in his career, Manyika was awarded a research fellowship at Oxford's Balliol College and served on the engineering faculty at Oxford. During that time he was also a faculty exchange fellow at the Massachusetts Institute of Technology and a visiting scientist at NASA Jet Propulsion Labs in California.

He joined McKinsey & Company in the United States by 1997, then became senior partner and a member of McKinsey’s board. He was chairman and director of the McKinsey Global Institute for 13 years and published extensively on emerging technologies, competitiveness, productivity and the economy. In February 2021, he co-authored a McKinsey report titled The Race in the Workplace: The Black Experience.

In 2022, he became Google’s first Senior Vice President of Technology and Society, reporting to CEO Sundar Pichai, where he helps shape Google's approaches on issues such as AI, the future of work, the digital economy, computing infrastructure and sustainability, focusing on how all of these benefit and affect societies, their economies and the planet as a whole. In April 2023, his role was expanded to Senior Vice President and President for Research, Labs, Technology & Society and now includes overseeing Google Research, which works on fundamental advances in computer science across areas such as AI and ML, algorithms and theory, privacy and security, quantum computing (Google Quantum AI), health AI, earth AI, as well as Google Labs and Google Learning and Sustainability. Also in 2023, Manyika, Jeff Dean, Demis Hassabis, Marian Croak, and Sundar Pichai published an open letter on Google's approach to AI entitled "Why we focus on AI (and to what end)". In 2025, Wired detailed Google's effort to catch-up on the "chatbot revolution" and Manyika's role, along with Hassabis and Dean, in both those efforts and the launch the Gemini program.

As for his roles on government advisory boards, in 2011, he was named to the US National Innovation Advisory Board at the Department of Commerce. During the Obama administration, from December 2012 until 2017, Manyika served as vice-chair of the United States Global Development Council at the White House. In 2017, he resigned from the Commerce Department's Digital Economy Board of Advisors after Donald Trump made controversial comments about deadly violence against counter-protestors in Charlottesville, Virginia. In 2022, Manyika was appointed as the vice-chair of the National Artificial Intelligence Advisory Committee established by Congress to advise the US President and the White House on a "range of issues related to artificial intelligence" and served until the end of this 3 year term in April 2025. Also in 2022, he was appointed by the US Secretary of State to the Foreign Affairs Policy Board and served until December 2024.

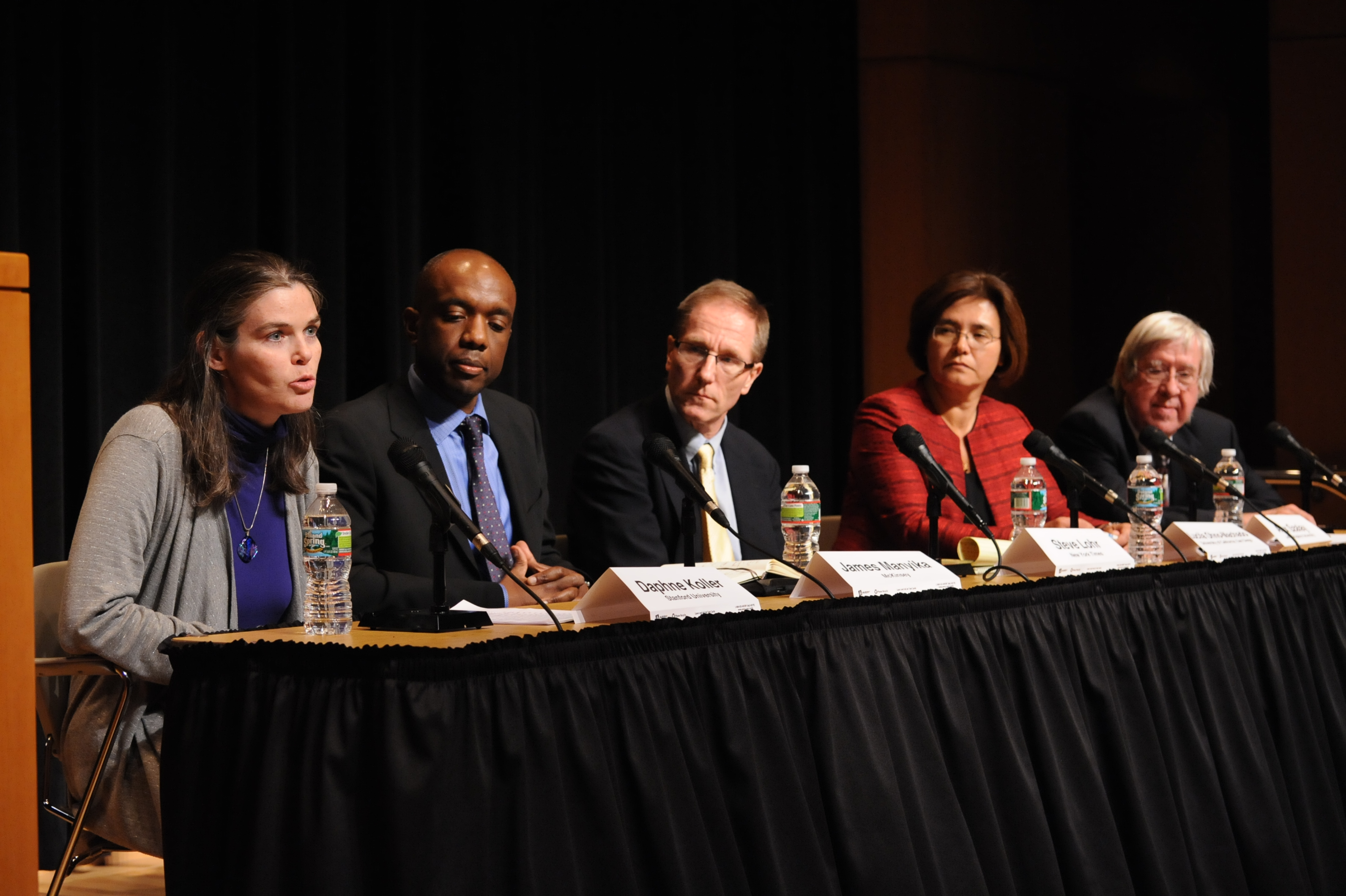
Manyika joins the U.S. Office of Science and Technology Policy in 2012

In October 2023, he was appointed by the UN Secretary General to the UN High-Level Advisory Body on Artificial Intelligence and to serve as co-chair of the body together with Carme Artigas, the Digital and AI Minister of Spain. The Advisory Body published its final report and recommendations in September 2024 titled “Governing AI for Humanity”. In 2026, he was appointed as a Founding Member of the UN’s AI for Good Global Commission including Heads of State and Government, industry CEOs and executives, and Heads of UN agencies.

In August 2019, California Governor Gavin Newsom appointed Manyika and Mary Kay Henry as co-chairs of the state's Future of Work Commission. In March 2021, he and the Future of Work Commission co-authored a report urging California to better address pay inequality and working conditions by 2030. He also co-chaired, with Admiral William H. McRaven, the Council on Foreign Relations Task Force on U.S. Innovation Strategy and National Security, which issued their final report, Innovation and National Security: Keeping Our Edge in 2019. In 2019, Manyika became a member of the Trilateral Commission, and in 2020 was a member of its Task Force on Global Capitalism in Transition.

In 2015, he co-wrote the book No Ordinary Disruption: The Four Global Forces Breaking All the Trends. Manyika was a guest speaker in September 2017 at an Estonian summit involving European Union heads of state. His decision-making process and predictions about the future of work were described in Ben Sasse's 2018 book Them: Why We Hate Each Other--and How to Heal. Manyika contributed one chapter to the 2018 book Architects of Intelligence: The truth about AI from the people building it, by Martin Ford.

He has guest-edited two volumes of Daedalus, the journal of the Academy of Arts and Sciences. In 2022, he edited a volume that was devoted to AI & Society and included his essay "Getting AI Right: Introductory Notes on AI & Society", as well as essays by leading AI researchers, technologists, and social scientists, including Stuart J. Russell, Nigel Shadbolt, Jeff Dean, Kevin Scott, Mira Murati, Yejin Choi, Blaise Agüera y Arcas, Eric Schmidt, Martha Minow, and Michael Spence. In 2026, he guest-edited a volume devoted to AI & Science. The volume included his essay “Introductory Notes: On AI, Science & the Future of Discovery”, as well as his dialogues with Demis Hassabis and with Yann LeCun, and essays from over 30 scientists.

In 2023, he contributed an essay in Stanford University's Digitalist Papers titled “Getting AI Right: A 2050 Thought Experiment”. He has co-authored papers with Nobel laureate Michael Spence, including in 2023 in Foreign Affairs “The Coming AI Economic Revolution: Can AI Reverse the Productivity Slowdown.” He contributed to the quantum error correction work, led by Hartmut Neven, which was recognized as the Physics World "2024 Breakthrough of the year."

In 2024, he was invited to the United Nations Economic Commission for Africa (UNECA) Conference of Ministers to give the Adebayo Adedeji Memorial Lecture. In 2025 he was invited to give the Royal Society of Engineering’s annual Hinton Lecture and to speak at King's College, Cambridge as part of The Next Turing Test Conference on the occasion of the 75th anniversary of Alan Turing’s Turing Test.

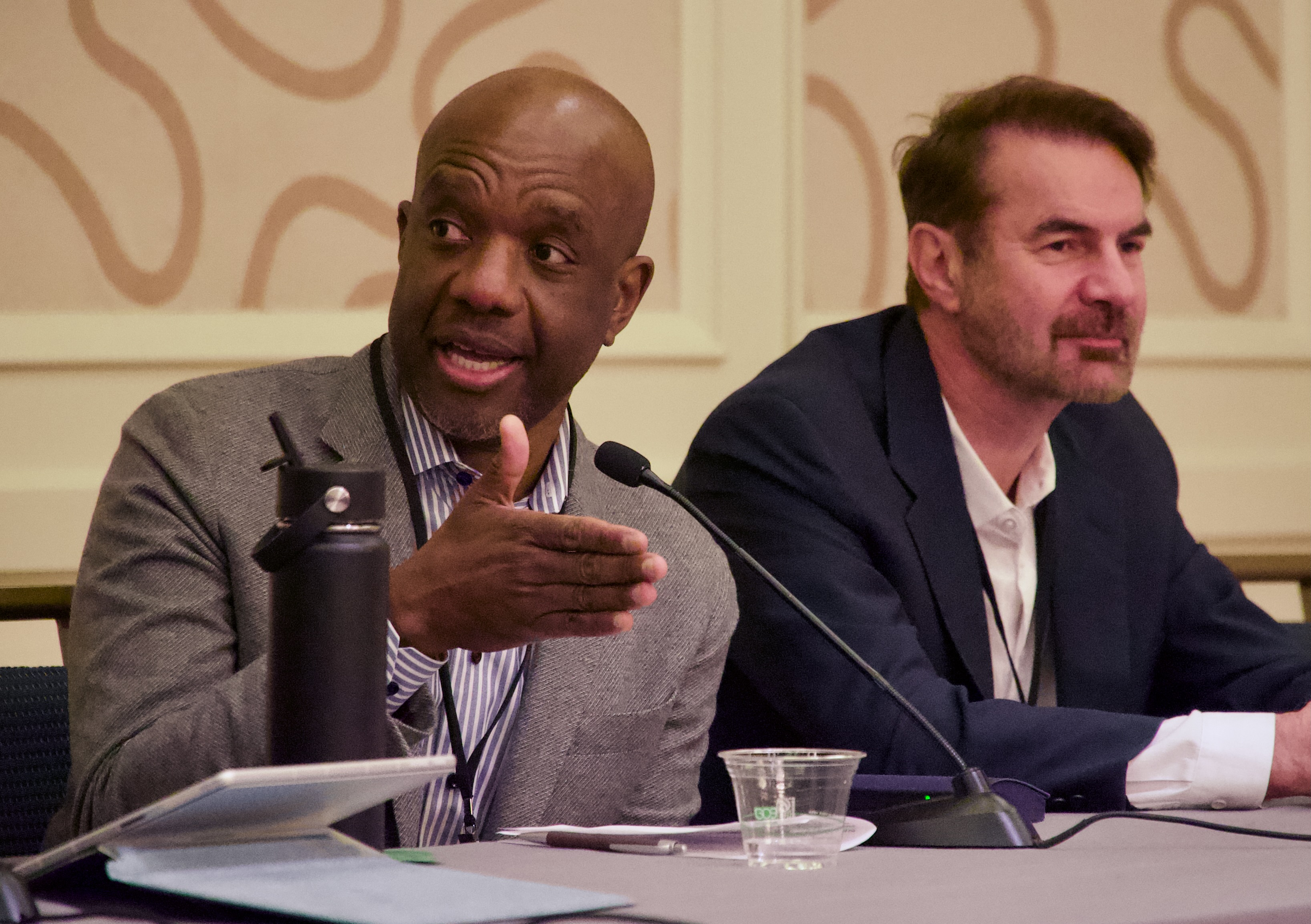
Manyika and Erik Brynjolfsson at AEA 2025 in San Francisco

In 2020, 2022, and 2025 he was named one of the 100 Most Influential Africans of 2020 by New African magazine. In 2023, he was listed in the inaugural TIME 100 AI: “The 100 Most Influential People in Artificial Intelligence.”

== Boards and academia ==
In 2023, Manyika was appointed to the board of Airbnb.

Manyika has been involved with a number of think tanks. He is an elected member of the Council on Foreign Relations, and has served the maximum number of terms, on the board of directors, and as member of the executive committee of the Council on Foreign Relations, a trustee of the Aspen Institute, and former trustee of the World Affairs Council of California. He was previously a non-resident Senior Fellow of Brookings Institution.

He is involved with a number of academic institutions. Since 2021, he has been an appointed visiting professor at Oxford’s Blavatnik School of Government. He is on the advisory boards of Harvard's Hutchins Center for African and African American Research, which includes the W. E. B. Du Bois Research Institute, and the Broad Institute of MIT and Harvard and is on the advisory councils of MIT’s Schwarzman College of Computing, University of Oxford's Institute for Ethics in AI, the Institute for Human-Centered Artificial Intelligence at Stanford University, and the International Association for Safe & Ethical AI and a member of its founding steering committee. Concerning digitization, he co-chairs Stanford University’s Digital Economy Lab, and has been on the advisory board of the Program on Innovation and Diffusion at the London School of Economics. He was previously on the advisory boards of the MIT Initiative on the Digital Economy (IDE) and the Oxford Internet Institute, having joined the latter in September 2011, and the University of Toronto’s Schwartz Reisman Institute for Technology and Society. He has been a member of the AI Index team at Stanford since 2017 and was an officer of the One Hundred Year Study on Artificial Intelligence, a project at Stanford University where experts discuss the future societal impacts of AI and was on the advisory board of the University of California, Berkeley School of Information. He is a member of the Editorial Board of the Journal of Globalization and Development.

Manyika has served on the National Academies of Science, Engineering and Medicine's Committee on Responsible Computing Research and its Application. He has served as a member of the Science, Engineering and Technology Committee of the American Academy of Arts and Sciences. He has been elected a fellow of the American Academy of Arts and Sciences, a life fellow of the Royal Society of Arts, an inaugural distinguished fellow of Stanford's Institute for Human-Centered AI, a distinguished fellow in ethics and AI at Oxford, a research fellow of DeepMind and a visiting fellow of All Souls College and a fellow at Balliol College, Oxford.

== Foundations and non-profits ==
Manyika serves on the board of the MacArthur Foundation's Lever For Change, which connects philanthropists to people and projects to fund solutions to societal challenges. Manyika has previously been a board member of the MacArthur Foundation, the Hewlett Foundation, and the Markle Foundation. He has been a trustee of the XPrize Foundation and an unpaid senior advisor at the philanthropic Schmidt Sciences, founded by Eric and Wendy Schmidt, where he co-chairs the AI2050 Initiative which supports academic fellows working to realize "the opportunity for society from AI as well as addressing the risks and challenges that could result from the technology." Through the Hutchins Center for African & African American Research, he established the J.M.D. Manyika Fellowship, named after his father, to support scholars and artists from countries in Southern Africa. He was previously on the board of the Khan Academy, which offers free education online, and remains on its Global Advisory Council.

== Publications ==
Books

- Decentralized Data Fusion: An Information Theoretic Approach (with Hugh F. Durrant-Whyte); Prentice Hall (December 1, 1994)
- No Ordinary Disruption: The Four Global Forces Breaking All the Trends (with Jonathan Woetzel, and Richard Dobbs); PublicAffairs (1 January 2015)

== Personal life ==
Manyika is married to the writer Sarah Ladipo Manyika.

== See also ==
- Members of the Council on Foreign Relations
- List of American Academy of Arts and Sciences members (2006–2019)
- List of Rhodes Scholars
