= Carme Artigas =

Spanish executive and politician (born 1968)

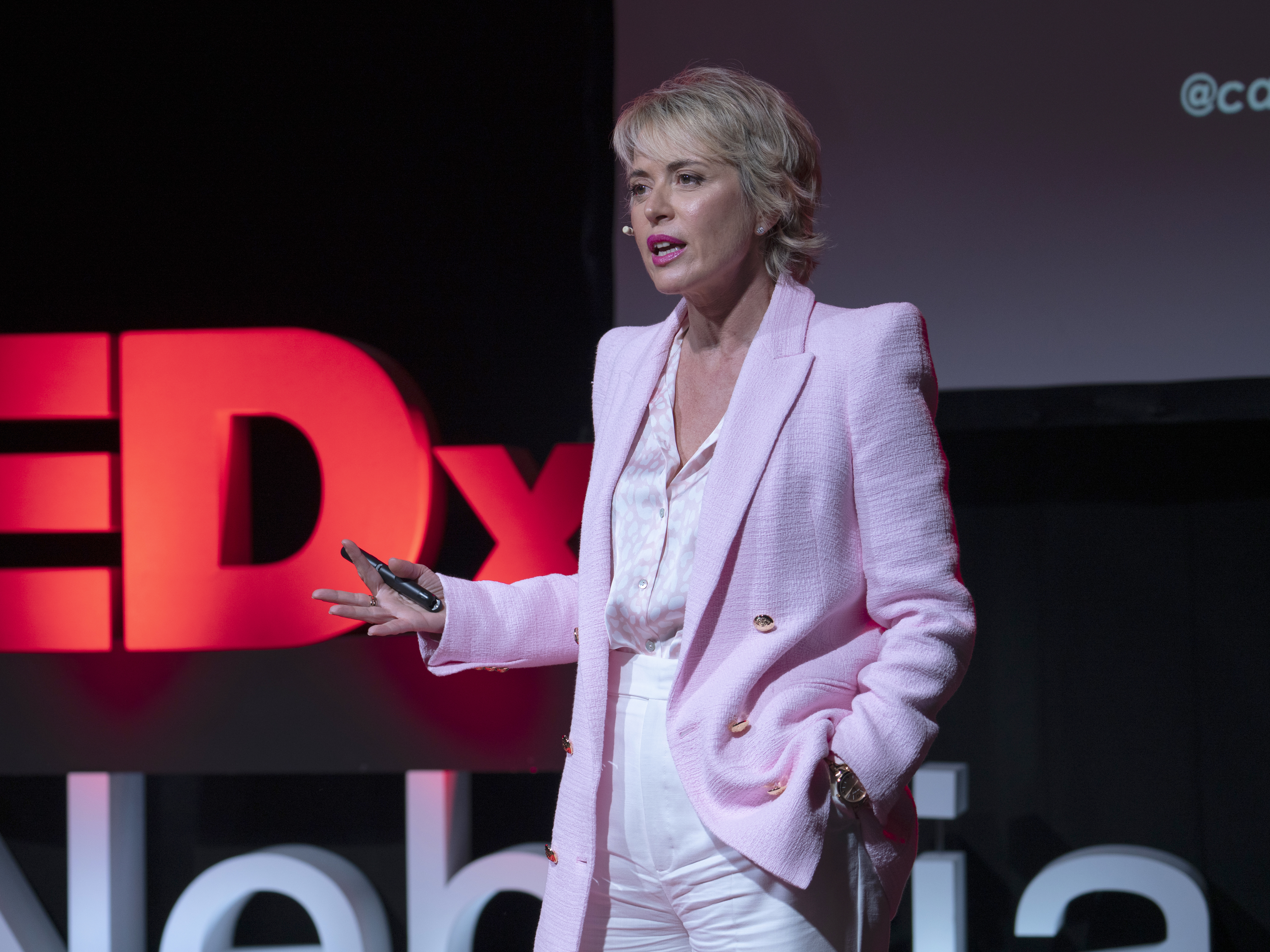
- Carme Artigas as a TEDxSpeaker
- Born: Carme Artigas Brugal; 1968 (age 57–58); Vilassar de Mar, Catalonia, Spain
- Occupation: Businessperson

Carme Artigas Brugal (Vilassar de Mar, 5 April 1968) is a Spanish executive, politician and businesswoman, primarily dedicated to the technology sector.

== Political career ==
From 2020 to 2023, Brugal served as Spain's Secretary of State for Digitalization and Artificial Intelligence, as well as president of the National Cybersecurity Institute and the Spanish Agency for the Supervision of Artificial Intelligence. She announced her resignation and departure back to the private sector on 19 December 2023.

She is also an ambassador in Spain for the Women in data science conferences at Stanford University and a member of the Data ideas factory innovation network of Columbia University.

In November 2023, Artigas was appointed co-chair of the AI Advisory Body of the United Nations, a new body looking "undertake analysis and advance recommendations for the international governance of AI". Later, in December 2023, Artigas led and coordinated the negotiations for the approval of an Artificial Intelligence Act to regulate AI at European level, in the context of the Spanish Presidency of the Council of the European Union.

== Other activities ==
- European Council on Foreign Relations (ECFR), Member
